= Berggruen =

Berggruen is a surname. Notable people with the surname include:

- Heinz Berggruen (1914–2007), German art dealer
- Nicolas Berggruen (born 1961), American/German investor
- Olivier Berggruen (born 1963), German-American art historian and curator

== See also ==
- Berggruen Prize
- Berggruen Institute
- Berggruen Museum
