= John Berggruen =

American art dealer

- Born: John Henry Berggruen; 18 June 1943 (age 83); San Francisco, California, U.S.
- Citizenship: United States; Germany
- Education: San Francisco State University
- Occupation: Art dealer
- Political party: Democratic
- Spouse: Gretchen Friedenberg (m. 1985; died 2020)
- Children: 1
- Father: Heinz Berggruen
- Relatives: Helen Berggruen (sister); Olivier Berggruen (half-brother); Nicolas Berggruen (half-brother)
- Website: Official website

John Henry Berggruen (born June 18, 1943) is an American art dealer who owns Berggruen Gallery in San Francisco, California, which has been a fixture in the Bay Area art scene since 1970.

== Early life and education ==
Berggruen was born June 18, 1943 in San Francisco, California to Heinz Berggruen, a noted German-born art collector and dealer, and Lillian Zellerbach, a scion of the prominent San Francisco family. His maternal grandfather was Isadore Zellerbach (1866-1941), who was the president of Crown Zellerbach Paper Company, and a devoted philanthropist.

His father, Heinz worked as an art critic for the San Francisco Chronicle, and in 1939 he became an assistant to the director at the San Francisco Museum of Modern Art. While organizing a Diego Rivera exhibition, Heinz had an affair with Rivera’s wife Frida Kahlo. Berggruen's parents divorced in 1945, and Heinz moved back to Europe.

Berggruen started his career in politics, working for the Democratic party while attending college. He graduated from San Francisco State University in 1966 and took an impromptu trip to Paris after graduation, in part to get to know his father, who operated a gallery there.

== Career ==
Spending time in his father's gallery inspired him to become an art dealer. He moved to London to work for the Brook Street Gallery from 1967–68, then moved to New York to work for the Perls Galleries from 1968-69. He was introduced to the work of Alexander Calder while working for the Perls Galleries.

At age 27, Berggruen moved back to San Francisco and decided to open his own gallery in May 1970 in a second floor walk-up at 257 Grant Avenue with $5,000 worth of Joan Miró prints lent to him on consignment from his father. Berggruen moved the gallery across the street to 228 Grant Avenue two years later and remained there for 43 years. In 2017 Berggruen reopened in an historic building with 10,000 square feet of exhibition space in San Francisco's South of Market District, directly across the street from the newly expanded San Francisco Museum of Modern Art.

Berggruen is known is known for exhibiting and selling works by Californian artists, Wayne Thiebaud, Richard Diebenkorn, and Ed Ruscha, as well as other artists associated with the Bay Area Figurative Movement such as Nathan Oliveira, Elmer Bischoff, Paul Wonner, and David Park. Berggruen is also known for introducing West Coast collectors to major East Coast artists as they were emerging such as Helen Frankenthaler, Robert Motherwell, Jasper Johns, Robert Rauschenberg, Roy Lichtenstein, and Mark di Suvero. Berggruen has played an instrumental role in developing several notable private and institutional collections on the West Coast by introducing these collectors to important artists, as well as helping to launch the careers of then-emerging artists, including Tom Sachs, Barry McGee, Lorna Simpson, Jennifer Bartlett and Michael Gregory. Berggruen has exhibited work by such influential artists as Georgia O'Keeffe, Philip Guston, Mark Tansey, Joseph Cornell, Ellsworth Kelly, Claes Oldenburg, Frank Stella, Jim Dine, Alexander Calder, and Henry Moore.

== Personal life ==
Berggruen married his wife Gretchen Berggruen (nee Friedenberg) in 1985 after having worked together at the gallery for nine years. The couple owned and operated Berggruen Gallery together until Gretchen's death in 2020. The Berggruens live in an 1854 home on San Francisco’s Russian Hill that was redesigned by Robert A.M. Stern in 1986. They have a son Alexander who opened his own eponymous gallery in New York in October 2019. Berggruen has one sister, Helen, and two half-siblings, Olivier Berggruen and Nicolas Berggruen.

== Philanthropy ==
Berggruen serves on the board of the Berggruen Museum in Berlin.
