= Aleksandër Moisiu =

Albanian-born Austrian actor (1879–1935)

Alexander Moissi
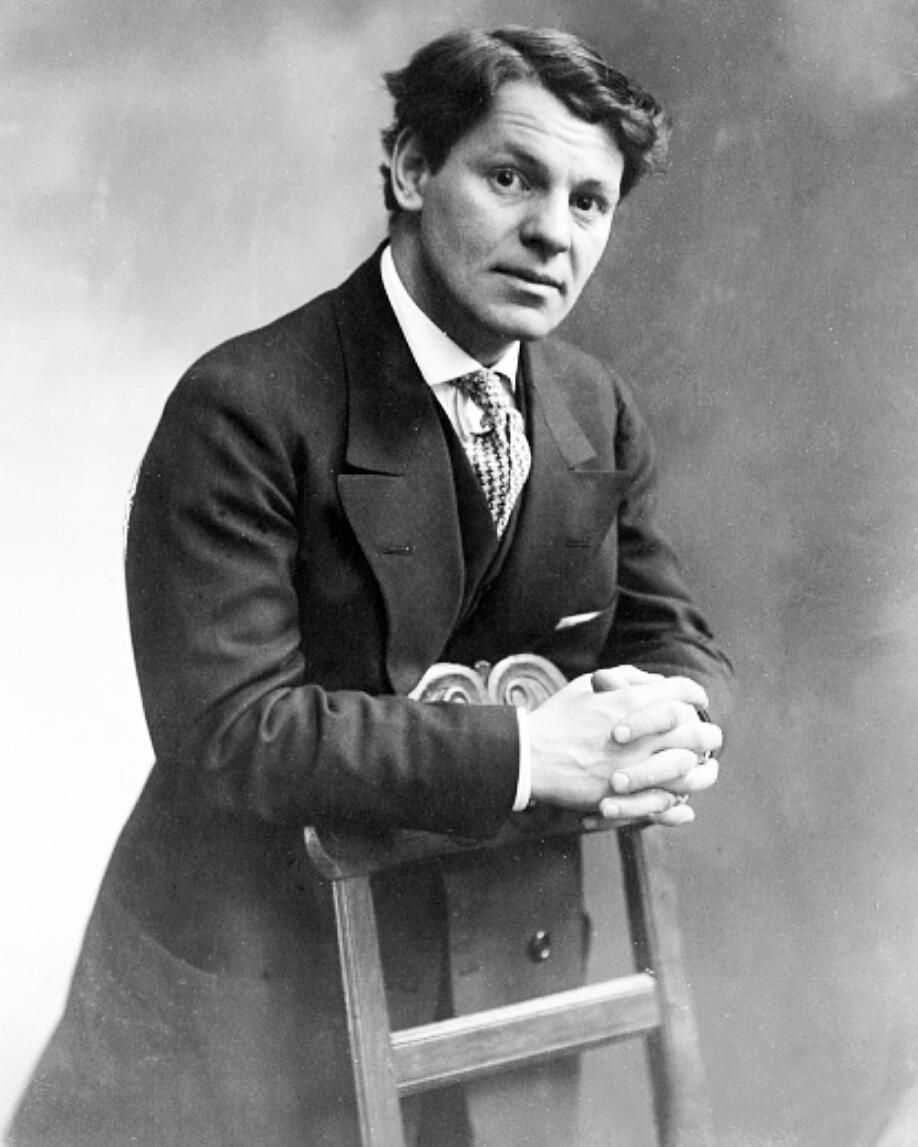
- Alexander Moissi ca. 1920
- Born: Alexander Moissi; 2 April 1879; Trieste, Austria-Hungary
- Died: 22 March 1935 (aged 55); Vienna, Austria
- Occupation: Actor
- Years active: 1899–1935
- Spouse(s): Maria Moissi (née Marie Urfus) (div.); Johanna Terwin
- Children: Beate Moissi; Bettina Moissi
- Relatives: Nicolas Berggruen (grandson); Olivier Berggruen (grandson); Gedeon Burkhard (great-grandson); Claudia von Auersperg (great-granddaughter) Spiro Moisiu; Alfred Moisiu
- Awards: Honor of the Nation

Alexander Moissi (Albanian: Aleksandër Moisiu; Italian: Alessandro Moissi; 2 April 1879 – 22 March 1935) was an Austrian stage actor (and occasional film actor) of Albanian origin.

== Early years ==
Moissi was born in Trieste to Moisi Moisiu from Kavaye, Ottoman Empire (today Kavajë in Albania), who was a rich Albanian merchant of oil and wheat, and an Arbëresh mother, Amalia de Rada, from Trieste, daughter of a Florentine doctor.

After an international childhood in Trieste, Durrës and Graz, the 20-year-old Alexander settled with his mother and two sisters in Vienna. He began vocal studies and applied for a drama training at the k.k. Hofburgtheater, but was rejected due to his strong Italian accent and had to confine himself to non-speaking roles. It was his performance in Molière's Tartuffe of the Burgtheater 1899/1900 season, which stunned the renowned Austrian actor Josef Kainz, playing the lead role.

With Kainz' encouragement and support, Moissi's career as one of the great European stage actors of the early-20th century began. The following year took him to the New German Theatre in Prague and in 1903 he joined the ensemble of the Deutsches Theater in Berlin, where he became a protégé of the influential director Max Reinhardt.

Together with Rudolph Schildkraut he performed in Reinhardt's staging of Shakespeare's The Merchant of Venice, now emphasizing his melodious speech, which despite first damning reviews finally made him a star. Moissi and the Reinhardt ensemble toured Russia in 1911 and was acclaimed in Saint Petersburg by critic and dramatist Anatoly Lunacharsky for his interpretation of Sophocles' Oedipus. Traveling across Europe and the Americas, his most famous role was Fedya in Tolstoy's The Living Corpse — performed more than 1400 times by him. In 1914, Moisiu acquired German citizenship to become a volunteer in World War I, and during the German Revolution of 1918–19 joined the Marxist Spartacus League.

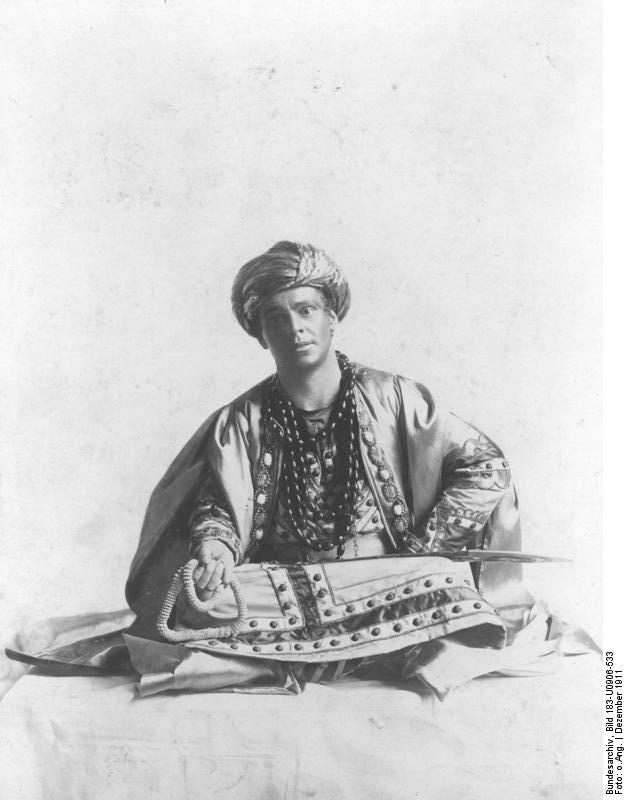
Moissi as Prince Kalaf in Gozzi's Turandot, Deutsches Theater, Berlin, December 1911

In 1920, he played the leading part in the first performance of Hugo von Hofmannsthal's Jedermann adaption of The Somonyng of Everyman at the Salzburg Festival. However, Moissi did not keep up with the German Expressionist and epic theatre movement initiated by directors like Erwin Piscator and Bertolt Brecht. He finally left Germany after the Nazi Machtergreifung in 1933 and was offered Albanian citizenship by King Zog.

Alexander Moissi died of pneumonia on 22 March 1935 in Vienna. He was cremated at Feuerhalle Simmering and his ashes are buried at the Morcote cemetery overlooking Lake Lugano in Switzerland.

== Work ==
In Berlin, Moissi was acclaimed for his 1906 performance of Oswald in Ibsen's Ghosts and in the premiere of Wedekind's Spring Awakening. His interpretations in the leading roles of Hamlet, Œdipus, Faust, and many others, were celebrated at the time, as were his voice and emotional range. Beside the Deutsches Theater, he performed at the Vienna Volkstheater and the Theater in der Josefstadt.

In 1929/30 Moissi played the title role in a German-language version of Hamlet in London's West End.

Though primarily a stage actor, he appeared in ten film productions from 1910 to 1935, of which seven were silent, most notably in The Student of Prague (1913).

Although a Christian, Moissi was often labeled as Jewish or of at least partial Jewish descent due to his name (which translates to "Moses") and his friendly relationship with fellow Jewish actors at a time when antisemitism was on the rise. ("Moisiu" is a common Albanian name and rarely indicates Jewish ancestry.) Moissi strongly rebuked his critics in the German press challenging the Christian world to live up to its ideals and desist from persecuting the Jews noting that: "Where Jews are concerned Christian morality, humaneness, and values are trampled underfoot" and "The road of anti-semitism is a throwback to the dark days of the Middle Ages."

== Legacy ==
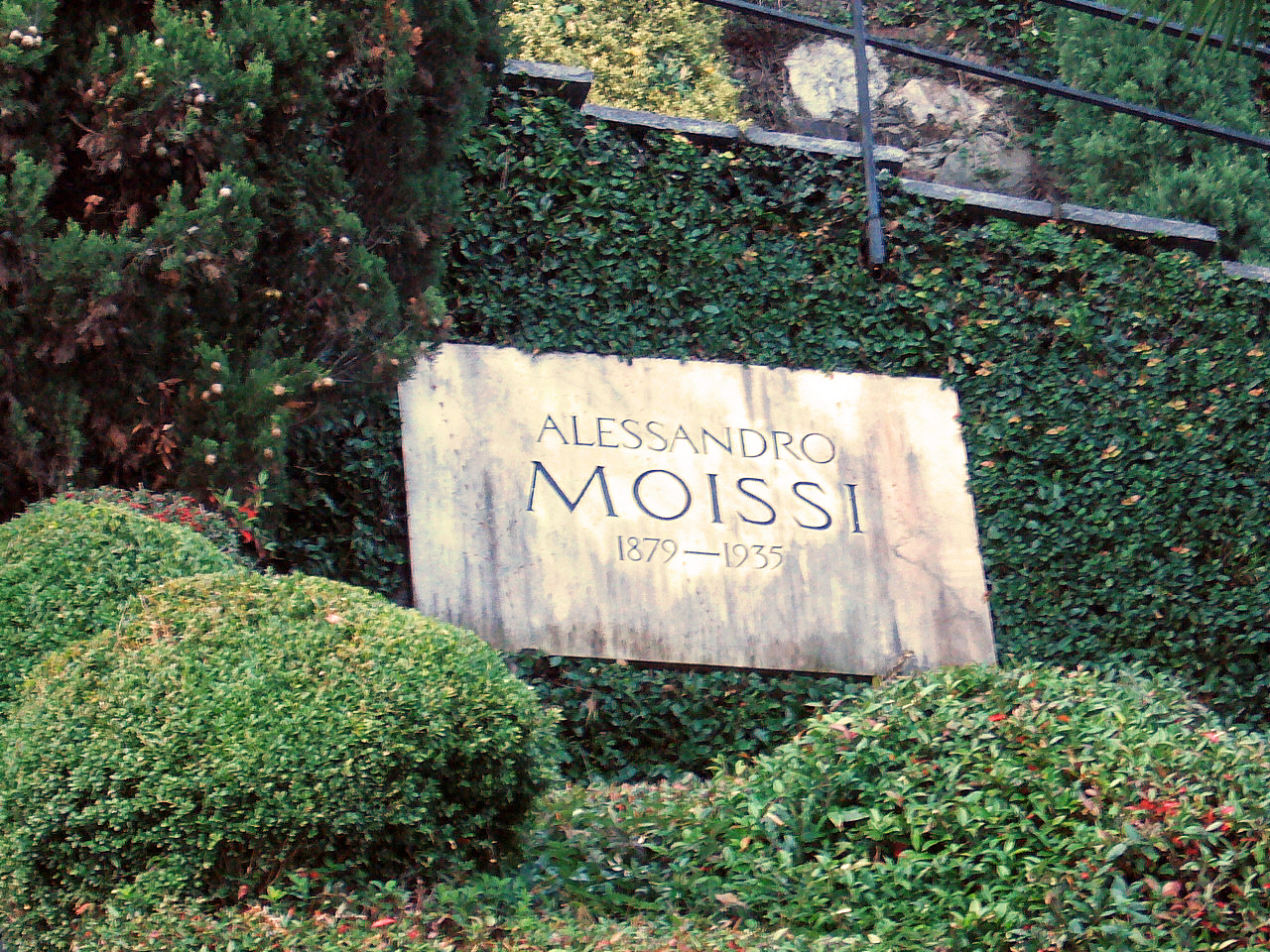
Moissi's grave, Morcote cemetery

Streets are named after Alexander Moissi in Berlin, Salzburg and Vienna, where also a monument was unveiled in 2005. In Albania he is highly venerated as a most important national actor. In his honor, the drama school of the Academy of Music and Arts in Tirana as well as the university and the city theatre of Durrës were named "Aleksandër Moisiu".

In his father's hometown of Kavajë, the main public high-school and the local theater are also named after him. The 60th anniversary of his death was remembered in Albania in 1995 with an "Artistic Year" dedicated to him; it was sponsored by the Aleksandër Moisiu Foundation.

== Personal life ==
Moissi was married twice:

- His first marriage was in 1910 to Maria Moissi (née Marie Urfus, born 1874 in Teplice, Bohemia, died 1943 in Berlin). In 1913 she founded the Maria Moissi drama school (Berlin), where her husband also taught. They had a daughter, Beatrice Moissi, later Beate von Molo (born 1906 in Munich, died 1998). Alexander Moissi had another daughter with the actress Herta Hambach, Bettina Moissi (1923–2023). Bettina later married the Jewish-American art collector Heinz Berggruen in 1959. One of their two children, Nicolas Berggruen, is a billionaire financier and art collector, while the other, Olivier, is an art historian.
- His second marriage was to the German actress Johanna Terwin.
- German actor Gedeon Burkhard is Moissi's great-grandson.

== Quotes ==
- "The voice and gestures of Moisiu presented us with something hitherto unseen on the European stage." – Franz Kafka
- "Hamlet is written for Moissi, and Moissi was uniquely born to interpret the Prince of Denmark." – Max Brod
- "I salute Aleksandër Moisiu to whom I am forever grateful, as one of the most brilliant interpreters of my characters." – Luigi Pirandello
- "Man of the South, always Man of the South. In order not to be frozen he takes the sun of his country whenever he goes. Whenever you are with him you'll learn something new about life in this world." – Stefan Zweig

== Selected filmography ==
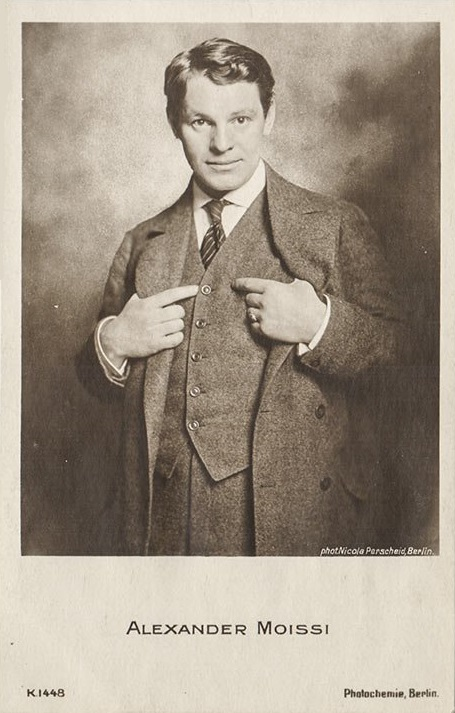

- Die Augen des Ole Brandis (1913)
- The Night of Queen Isabeau (1920)
- The Royal Box (1929)
- Lorenzino de Medici (1935) https://www.youtube.com/watch?v=jVUNIhohAxQ
