= Michael Gregory =

Michael Gregory may refer to:

- Michael Gregory (actor) (born 1944), American actor
- Michael Gregory (artist) (born 1955), American painter
- Michael Gregory (jazz guitarist) (born 1953), American jazz guitarist
- Michael Gregory (Royal Navy officer) (born 1945), former Royal Navy officer
- Michael Gregory, member of the American musical group The Gregory Brothers
- Mike Gregory (1964–2007), rugby league player and later coach
- Mike Gregory (darts player) (born 1956), English professional darts player

== See also ==
- Michael Gregor (aircraft engineer) (1888–1953)
