= Nicolas Berggruen =

German-American investor and philanthropist (born 1961)

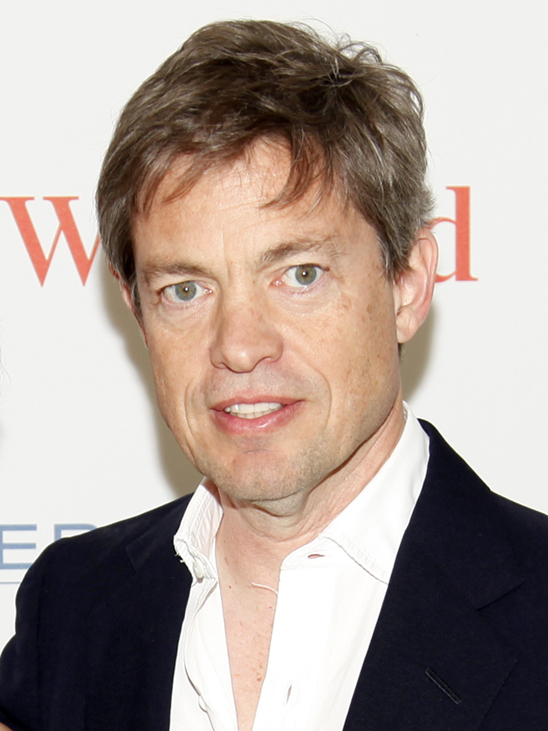
- Berggruen in 2017
- Born: 10 August 1961 (age 65); Paris, France
- Citizenship: Germany; United States
- Education: New York University (BS)
- Children: 2
- Parents: Heinz Berggruen (father); Bettina Moissi (mother)
- Relatives: Olivier Berggruen (brother); John Berggruen (half-brother)
- Website: Official website

Nicolas Berggruen (/ˈbɜːrɡruːn, bɜːrˈɡruːən/; born 10 August 1961) is a German-American billionaire investor and philanthropist. Born in Paris, France, he is a dual German and American citizen. He is the founder and president of Berggruen Holdings, a private investment company and the co-founder and chairman of the Berggruen Institute, a non-profit, non-partisan think tank.

== Early life and education ==
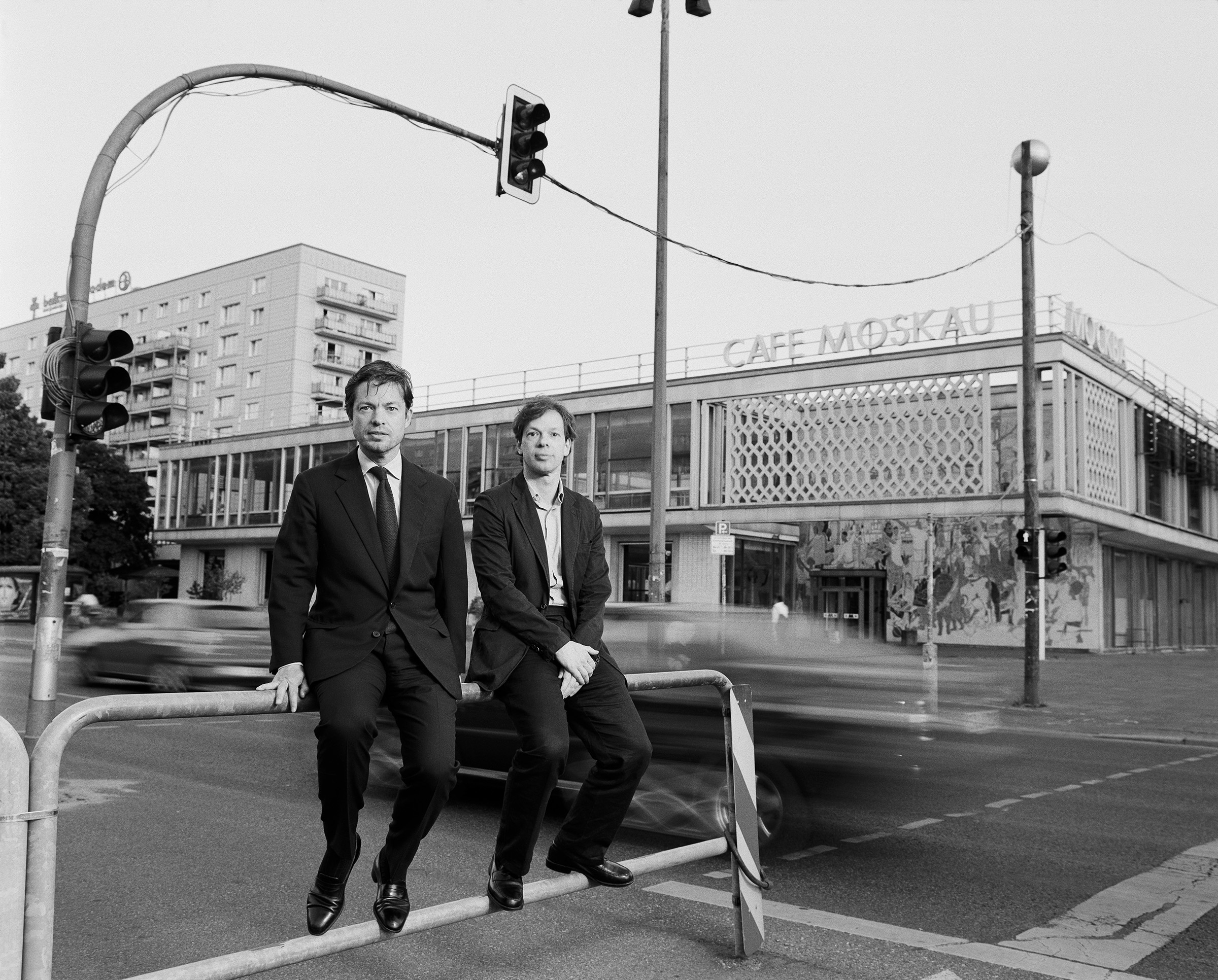
Nicolas Berggruen and Olivier Berggruen photographed by Oliver Mark, Berlin 2008

Nicolas Berggruen was born in Paris, France. He is the son of art collector and dealer Heinz Berggruen and actress Bettina Moissi. His father comes from a German Jewish family, and his mother was a Catholic Albanian and German, the daughter of actors Aleksandër Moisiu and Herta Hambach. Heinz Berggruen was considered one of the world's greatest art collectors, having donated and sold works by Picasso, Klee, and Matisse to the Berggruen Museum in Berlin, the Metropolitan Museum of Art in New York City, and the National Gallery in London. His mother played the female lead in the 1948 German Holocaust film Long Is the Road. Although born in France, Berggruen's first language is German. He is also fluent in English and French. Berggruen has two older half-siblings from his father's first marriage: John, an art dealer, and Helen, an artist. He has a full younger brother, Olivier, an art historian and curator. Berggruen credits his father for his competitive drive: "What I learned from my father [was] passion and focus... He valued quality over quantity".

Nicolas and Olivier attended elementary school at the École alsacienne in Paris. They were raised Catholic. Growing up in Paris in the 1970s, Berggruen spent his time reading. Berggruen attended high school at Le Rosey in Switzerland. Berggruen refused to learn English at the time because he thought it was "the language of imperialism." Berggruen had a rebellious nature, frequently challenging teachers on intellectual matters and eventually, he was expelled from the school for sedition. At 16, Berggruen passed his state exams in Paris before completing a baccalauréat in Paris as a candidat libre. In 1978, Nicolas moved to London, where he became fluent in English and was trained by Max Rayne at London Merchant Securities.

At age 17, Berggruen moved to New York to attend New York University, where he obtained a bachelor's degree in Finance and International Business in 1981.

== Investment career ==
=== Early business experience ===
After obtaining his degree, Berggruen moved to Philadelphia to work under Sid Bass for the real estate arm of Bass Brothers Enterprises. Between 1983 and 1987, Berggruen was a Principal at Jacobson and Co., a leveraged buyout company.

=== Berggruen Holdings ===
Berggruen moved back to New York and started investing in real estate and public stocks using his trust fund worth about $250,000. He later expanded to private equity, venture capital, and hedge funds.

In 1984, he founded Berggruen Holdings, Inc. as an investment vehicle for the Nicolas Berggruen Charitable Trust. Berggruen Holdings predominately operates as a long-term investor/owner for their portfolio companies. In the mid-1980s, Berggruen began purchasing distressed real estate across New York City and has since made over 100 direct control and real estate investments globally. In 1988, he and Julio Mario Santo Domingo, Jr. co-founded Alpha Investment Management, a hedge fund. The firm grew to about $2 billion under management before the founders reportedly sold to Safra Bank in 2004.

In 2005, for the symbolic fee of 1 euro, Berggruen bought the insolvent German retailer Karstadt, investing over 65 million euros (US$83 million) and saving over 25,000 jobs. Commenting on the importance of the retail brand, Berggruen said: “We want to take a brand with a big presence all across Germany and restore it to all its former glory.” In 2010, having spent 400 million euros, he brought the company out of bankruptcy.

Through Freedom Acquisitions – his first investment vehicle that went public in 2006 – Berggruen bought a stake in the hedge fund group GLG Partners in 2007. In 2009, with his second fund, Liberty Acquisitions, Berggruen bought Pearl Insurance, and in 2010, he bought a majority stake in the Spanish media group, Prisa, for a reported US$900 million.

In 2011, alongside business partner Martin Franklin and investor William Ackman, Berggruen launched his third investment vehicle, Justice Holding, a company that raised £900m in its initial public offering. In 2012, Justice holdings took an £881m (29%) stake in Burger King Worldwide, Inc.

In the mid-2000s, Berggruen Holdings began acquiring residential and commercial real estate across the world in Tel Aviv, Berlin, Istanbul, and the American West Coast. In 2012, the company owned and operated a portfolio of more than 90 buildings in Berlin, Germany. In Tel Aviv, Berggruen worked with architect Richard Meier to design a luxury-apartment complex on Rothschild Boulevard. In 2014, the real estate investments became the foundation of Berggruen's NBP Capital, specializing in investment management, development, construction, hospitality, and property management services. In 2020, NBP Capital's market value exceeded $1 billion.

In 2012, through Berggruen Holdings, Berggruen was a primary investor and developer in Newark, New Jersey's Teachers Village. Designed by Richard Meier, the project revitalized five blocks of downtown Newark.

In 2013, Berggruen Holdings invested in the East Africa Exchange, a privately funded regional, agricultural commodities exchange in East Africa. The exchange aims to increase regional market efficiency and ensure higher incomes for farmers, especially smallholder farmers. Berggruen said, "Agriculture is key to Africa's prosperity, and so aiding the flow of information and finance within the agricultural sector will be especially helpful." Additionally, Berggruen Holdings, Heirs Holdings, and 50 Ventures partnered to form Africa Exchange Holdings, Ltd (AFEX), to develop a network of commodity exchanges to transform trade dynamics and ensure higher incomes for the rural poor.

By 2011, Berggruen Holdings had offices in Berlin, Istanbul, Mumbai, New York, and Tel Aviv, nine senior executives, owned more than 30 companies across various industries and asset classes, and was valued at more than 1.5 billion euros.

== Berggruen Institute ==
In 2010, Nicolas founded the Berggruen Institute, an independent think tank aiming to reshape political and social institutions on governance, economic systems, globalization, geopolitics, and technology. To address these issues, Berggruen invested US$100 million into the Institute, subsequently endowing it with an additional US$500 million in 2016.

Berggruen launched the Institute after a series of organized discussions in California aimed at addressing the state's expanding debt. The talks became the Think Long Committee for California, a bipartisan initiative focused on reforming California's governance system. The initiative garnered the support of prominent political players, including former secretary of state Condoleezza Rice, billionaire entrepreneur Eli Broad, former California governor Gray Davis, and Eric Schmidt, the former CEO of Google. The sessions produced a bill to reform California's referendum system, which then California governor Jerry Brown signed into law in 2012.

=== Initiatives ===
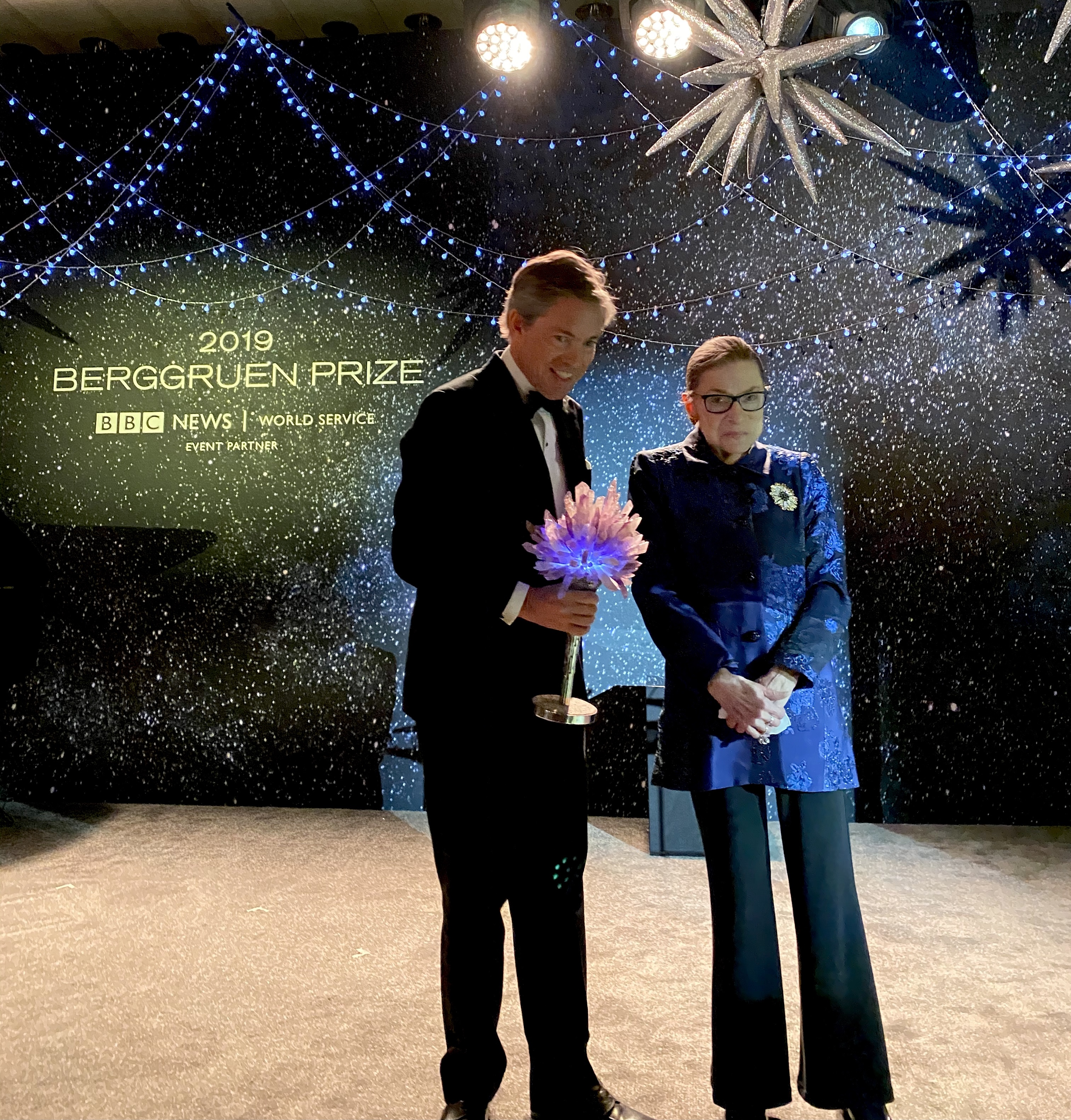
Nicolas Berggruen and Justice Ruth Bader Ginsburg in 2019

Through the Institute, Berggruen has launched several government reform projects, including the 21st Century Council, which is focused on global governance challenges, the Council for the Future of Europe, to support work on European integration. Members of the Institute's 21st Century Council include several former heads of state and government, Tony Blair, Gerhard Schröder, Helle Thorning Schmidt, Fernando Henrique Cardoso, and Nicolas Sarkozy, amongst others.

In 2015, Berggruen announced the launch of the Berggruen Philosophy and Culture Center. In collaborations with Peking, Stanford, New York, and Oxford Universities, amongst others, the Center brings together leading thinkers from around the world to ponder how culture and philosophy inform political thinking. The Center offers a fellowship program between Chinese and American universities and an annual $1 million philosophy prize awarded by an international jury.

=== Campus ===
In 2017, Berggruen purchased a 450-acre stretch of land in the Santa Monica Mountains overlooking Los Angeles to create a 137,000 sq ft (12,700 m^{2}) Scholars’ Campus. The campus will house the Center's educational programs, fellows, and scholars. Herzog & de Meuron and L.A's Gensler will lead a team of architects in the campus design. The campus, named Monteverdi, will build on approximately 22 of the 450-acre estate and delegate the remaining 95% as protected open space.

== Philosophical views ==
=== Democracy ===
Berggruen's beliefs on renewing democracy include a stable US–China relationship, participation without populism, addressing climate change, and instituting "universal basic capital" to ensure adequate living conditions for everyone regardless of employment status. His views of democracy call for an inclusive political culture and positive nationalism. Berggruen states: "Democracy is really about giving individuals a place in society, a voice—respect, in some ways—equality as humans. It's also a system. It's not every individual for themselves; it has to be society as a whole."

=== Published work ===
In 2012, Berggruen and Nathan Gardels published the book Intelligent Governance for the 21st Century: A Middle Way Between West and East. The book's central argument is that populism and short-term thinking have hindered the Western democracies' progress, while many authoritarian Eastern nations, China, in particular, would benefit from strengthening their meritocratic systems with the popular legitimacy that is typical of Western governments. Published in English, the book was later translated into Spanish, Portuguese, and other languages. The Financial Times named it as one of their "Best Books of 2012".

In 2019, Berggruen and Gardels published their second book, Renovating Democracy: Governing in the Age of Globalization and Digital Capitalism. The authors advocate for the restructuring of democratic government frameworks to ensure adequate living conditions for everyone. They argue that in a time where jobs are being replaced by technology, employment should not determine if a person's basic needs are accounted for.

== Philanthropy ==
Berggruen has committed to giving the majority of his wealth through the Nicolas Berggruen Charitable Trust. In 2010, he joined Bill Gates and Warren Buffett's The Giving Pledge to address some of society’s most pressing problems.

== Art ==
Berggruen's father was an influential art dealer and collector who left a legacy of donations to various museums. His youngest brother, Olivier Berggruen, is an art historian and curator. An avid collector in the early 1980s and 1990s, while living in NYC, Berggruen began collecting Andy Warhol and Jean-Michel Basquiat. In his approach to collecting, Berggruen stated: "Collecting should be guided by your eye, your tastes. It's an intellectual pursuit."

Berggruen is the head of the Board of the Berggruen Museum in Berlin. He is a member of the Los Angeles County Museum (LACMA), the International Councils of the Tate Gallery in London, and the Museum of Modern Art in New York as well as a member of the Beyeler Foundation, the International Council of the Serpentine Gallery, and Sotheby's International Advisory Board. He is an International Ambassador of The Feuerle Collection, based in Berlin.

In cooperation with LACMA, Berggruen has been making acquisitions intended for the museum. In 2006 he purchased the Chris Burden kinetic sculpture Metropolis II and lent it on a long-term loan basis to LACMA.

In 2021, Berggruen signed a preliminary agreement to purchase the Casa dei Tre Oci on the Giudecca island in Venice, with plans to use the space to host symposia, workshops and exhibitions in partnership with major museums. In 2022, he also bought the Palazzo Diedo in the Cannaregio district, which is to focus primarily on dedicated artist commissions; the first artist-in-residence is Sterling Ruby.

== Associations and awards ==
Berggruen is a member of the Council on Foreign Relations, Director on the Board of the Pacific Council on International Policy, a member of Foro Iberoamericano, a member of the Helena Group, and a member of the Commission on Global Ethics and Citizenship. In 2013 he was appointed by Harvard's Center for European Studies as its first non-resident Senior Fellow. He was named a member of the Brookings Institution's International Advisory Council and the NYU President's Global Council. In 2014 he was named a member of the Leadership Council at Harvard Kennedy School's Center for Public Leadership, a member of Harvard University's Global Advisory Council, and a trustee of the Asia Society. He is also a member of the World Economic Forum.

Berggruen was honored by his alma mater, NYU Stern, at the 2016 Haskins Giving Society Award Dinner for his commitment to business and public service. In 2018, he received the Ellis Island Medal of Honor. In 2025, he was named an honorary trustee of Peking University.

== Personal life ==
In the early 2000s, Berggruen was dubbed "the homeless billionaire" when he sold off his residential properties and belongings. At 40 years old, he did not own a house, a car, or a watch. Instead, he traveled, staying in different hotels with only a small bag of clothes and his BlackBerry. He retained his Gulfstream IV private jet, noting that it is too "practical" to dispense with. In an interview with Bloomberg, Berggruen stated: "I'm not that interested in material things. As long as I find a good bed that I can sleep in, that's enough".

From 2012, Berggruen purchased several apartments in the Sierra Towers, where he lived for several years. In 2016, he had two children born from one egg donor and two surrogates. He lives with them in Los Angeles. Berggruen bought a 20,000 sq ft (1,900 m^{2}) home in Holmby Hills for $42 million in 2017. In 2021, he acquired the Gordon Kaufmann-designed, 29,000 sq ft (2,700 m^{2}) Hearst estate in Beverly Hills for $63.1 million, at the time the most ever paid for a home at an auction. The property was renamed the Beverly Estate in 2022.

He dated Noor Alfallah in 2018.
