= Berggruen Prize Essay Competition =

American annual writing competition

The Berggruen Prize Essay Competition is an annual contest organized by the Berggruen Institute.

== History ==
The Berggruen Prize Essay Competition was established by the Berggruen Institute in early 2024. Nathan Gardels, editor-in-chief of Noema, introduced the essay competition in February 2024, describing it as complementary to the Institute's existing Philosophy & Culture Prize. It draws inspiration from historical precedents, such as the Académie de Dijon competition of 1750, won by Jean-Jacques Rousseau, and seeks to identify new thinkers and innovative ideas.

The inaugural Berggruen Prize Essay Competition opened submissions in spring 2024, accepting essays in English or Chinese. Initially, one winner in each language category was to be awarded US $25,000. Organizers specified that submissions should be accessible and intellectually engaging essays, rather than formal academic papers. The 2024 theme was 'planetarity," defined as humanity's shared existence on a finite planet and the development of new conceptual frameworks. Essays addressed issues related to human interactions, technology, and ecological systems.

In October 2024, the Institute announced the results. Due to the quality of submissions, two winners were selected in each language category instead of one, each receiving US $12,500. The winners in English were astrophysicist Adam Frank for his essay "The Coming Second Copernican Revolution" and writer Pamela Swanigan for "It’s Time to Give Up Hope for a Better Climate & Get Heroic." In Chinese, the winners were Lin Yichao for "Planetary Mechanism and Its Conceptual Manifestation" and philosopher Xu Yingjin from Fudan University for "How to Make Confucianism Digitalized on a Planetary Scale" The winning essays were published in Noema (English) and Cui Ling (Chinese). An awards ceremony was held at the Berggruen Europe Center in Venice, Italy, during a conference titled "Planetary Summit" in November 2024, featuring discussions between winners and established scholars.

Following its first year, the Berggruen Institute announced that the competition would become an annual event. For the second edition in 2025, the prize increased to US $50,000 for the winning essay in each language category. The 2025 theme was "consciousness," inviting entrants to explore the topic from scientific, philosophical, and cross-cultural perspectives. Participants were asked to address questions regarding the origins, material nature, and limitations of consciousness among humans and artificial systems. As of April 2025, the results of the second competition have not yet been announced.

== Competition ==
Participants submit essays addressing philosophical and cultural questions in accessible language. The competition accepts essays written in either English or Chinese, with prize awards initially set at US $25,000 per language category and scheduled to increase to US $50,000 by 2025. It operates alongside the separate Berggruen Prize for Philosophy and Culture, valued at US $1 million, but differs by specifically targeting new ideas from diverse cultural perspectives rather than recognizing established scholars. Winning essays are published in the Institute’s journals: Noema for English-language essays and Cui Ling for Chinese-language essays.

== Recipients ==
- 2024 (Theme: "Planetarity")

English: Adam Frank, "The Coming Second Copernican Revolution"; Pamela Swanigan, "It's Time to Give Up Hope for a Better Climate & Get Heroic."
Chinese: Lin Yichao (林逸超), "Planetary Mechanism and Its Conceptual Manifestation”; Xu Yingjin (徐英瑾), “How to Make Confucianism Digitalized on a Planetary Scale?"

Each received US $12,500 and was honored at a ceremony in Venice.

- 2025 (Theme: "Consciousness")

TBA
