= Intelligent Governance for the 21st Century =

Intelligent Governance for the 21st Century. A Middle Way between West and East
- First edition
- Author: Nicolas Berggruen and Nathan Gardels
- Language: English
- Subject: Governance
- Publisher: Polity
- Publication place: United Kingdom

Intelligent Governance for the 21st Century: A Middle Way Between West and East is a book published in 2012 by the investor and philanthropist Nicolas Berggruen and the editor and writer Nathan Gardels.

It argues that Western democracies have become stymied by populism and short-term thinking, while authoritarian Eastern nations, notably China, need to bolster their meritocratic but authoritarian systems with the popular legitimacy characteristic of Western polities.

The book was first published in English and later translated into Spanish, Portuguese and other languages.

== Contents ==
- Chapter 1: "Globalization and the Challenges to Good Governance" contrasts the geopolitical and geo-civilizational outlooks of West and East as they face the transition underway from American-led globalization to an interdependence of plural identities.
- Chapter 2: "America's Consumer Democracy versus China's Modern Mandarinate" analyzes the contemporary strengths and deficiencies of both systems.
- Chapter 3: "Liberal Democratic Constitutionalism and Meritocracy: Hybrid Possibilities" revisits debates over the qualities of political meritocracy versus electoral democracy as forms of good governance. In particular, it examines affinities of Western classical and Enlightenment thinkers with Confucian precepts.
- Chapter 4: "The New Challenges for Governance: Social Networks, Megacities, and the Global Scattering of Productive Capabilities" brings older governance debates into the 21st century.
- Chapter 5: "Intelligent Governance: Tenets and Template" is an exercise in political imagination that proposes an institutional design for a middle way between West and East.
- Chapter 6: "Rebooting California's Dysfunctional Democracy" describes the Berggruen Institute on Governance's work to find ways for of the American state of California to redesign its government in order to escape from legislative gridlock and chronic fiscal weakness.
- Chapter 7: "The G-20: Global Governance from Summits to Subnational Networks" shows the Berggruen Institute on Governance's efforts to make the Group of 20 more effective.
- Chapter 8: "Europe: Political Union and the Democratic Deficit" describes how the Berggruen Institute on Governance has encouraged the European Union toward closer political and fiscal unity.

The book's conclusion, "Survival of the Wisest", argues that wisdom and long-term thinking combined to democratic legitimacy is the right political combination for success in a globalized world.
