= Kuehn Malvezzi =

Architecture office in Berlin, Germany

Kuehn Malvezzi is an architectural practice in Berlin founded by Johannes Kuehn, Wilfried Kuehn and Simona Malvezzi in 2001. They work as exhibition designers, architects and curators, with a focus on museums and public spaces.

Kuehn Malvezzi's early projects include the exhibition spaces for Documenta11 in Kassel (2002) and the extension of the Rieckhallen at the Hamburger Bahnhof, Museum for Contemporary Art in Berlin (2004). In 2007 they were responsible for the conversion of a former industrial building to house of the Julia Stoschek Collection in Düsseldorf. They reorganized the historical and contemporary art collections of the Österreichische Galerie Belvedere at the Belvedere Palace in Vienna (2007); and the Liebieghaus sculpture collection in Frankfurt (2009). Museum projects in Berlin include the extension of Museum Berggruen (2013); the Museum of Decorative Arts (2014), and the conversion of the Prinzessinnenpalais on Unter den Linden boulevard, to house the PalaisPopulaire – a venue for art, culture and sports by Deutsche Bank.

Kuehn Malvezzi took part in the competition for the Humboldt Forum in Berlin (2008), and attracted acclaim for their critical approach towards the reconstruction briefing. Their concept won the special jury prize, as well as the 2009 German Critics’ Prize in the architecture category.

In 2012 Kuehn Malvezzi won the international competition for the interreligious House of One in Berlin. On the site of Berlin's earliest church at Petriplatz, a synagogue, a church and a mosque will be built under one roof, with construction due to start in 2020.

From 2006 - 2012 Wilfried Kuehn was professor for exhibition design and curatorial practice at the Staatliche Hochschule für Gestaltung Karlsruhe, and since 2018 he is professor in design at the Technical University Vienna. Johannes Kuehn has been professor at the Bauhaus-University Weimar since October 2016. Johannes Kuehn, Wilfried Kuehn and Simona Malvezzi are visiting professors at the Harvard Graduate School of Design in 2019.

== Projects ==
- PHI Contemporary, Montreal, Canada, conversion and new construction for a contemporary art institution, with Pelletier de Fontenay and Jodoin Lamarre Pratte architectes (Competition 1st Prize, 2022)
- Bâtiment d'art contemporian (BAC), Geneva, redesign and extension, with CCHE Genève (Competition 1st Prize 2022)
- Insectarium Montreal, with Pelletier de Fontenay and Jodoin Lamarre Pratte architectes, 2022 (Competition 1st Prize 2014)
- Holzmarktstrasse, commercial building ensemble, Berlin, construction 2022
- ZAC Saint-Vincent-de-Paul, Lot Petit, Housing, Paris, with Nicolas Dorval-Bory and Plan Común (competition 1st Prize 2019)
- Administrative building with rooftop greenhouse, Oberhausen, 2019
- Hartenbergpark Mainz, residential development (competition 1st Prize, 2016)
- X-D-E-P-O-T, Die Neue Sammlung – The Design Museum, Pinakothek der Moderne, Munich, 2020
- House of One, Berlin (competition 1st Prize, 2012)
- PalaisPopulaire by Deutsche Bank, conversion Prinzessinenpalais, Berlin, 2018
- Commercial Building Hohe Strasse, Cologne, 2018
- Mariendom Linz, conversion of the sanctuary, with Heimo Zobernig 2018
- DAAD-galerie, Berliner Künstlerprogramm des DAAD, Berlin 2017
- Villengarten am Relenberg, residential development, Stuttgart, 2017
- Extension of the Modern Gallery (Moderne Galerie), Saarland Museum, Saarbrücken, 2017
- Herzog Anton Ulrich Museum, new design for the museum collection, Braunschweig, 2016
- Galerie Neu, Berlin 2015
- MMK2 im Taunusturm, Museum für Moderne Kunst, Frankfurt am Main 2014
- Karlstrasse 47, commercial and residential building, Munich, 2014
- Joseph Pschorr House, commercial and residential building, Munich, 2014
- Torstrasse 86 Berlin, new residential building with retail spaces, Berlin 2014
- Museum of Decorative Arts Berlin, conversion and restructuring of the collection, Berlin 2014
- Komuna Fundamento, 13th Venice Architecture Biennale, 2012
- Extension Museum Berggruen, Berlin 2013
- Chalet 7 – Gesundheitszentrum Wetzlgut, new construction, Bad Gastein 2012
- Skihütte Rossalm, new construction, Bad Gastein 2010
- Belvedere Museum, conversion of listed building and new passageway to the Orangery, with artist Heimo Zobernig, Vienna 2008, 2009
- Liebieghaus, museological redesign and refurbishment, Frankfurt 2008, 2009
- Candida Höfer Stiftung, conversion and Extension, Cologne 2008
- Julia Stoschek Collection, conversion of an industrial building for the presentation of the collection, Düsseldorf, 2007
- Lauder Business School, extension of the college and boarding school, Vienna, 2006
- Berlinische Galerie, museum foyer and forecourt, Berlin 2004
- Schirn Kunsthalle, foyer and guidance system, Frankfurt 2002
- Documenta11, conversion Binding-Brauerei and exhibition venues, Kassel 2002

== Exhibition Architecture (Selection) ==
- Vertigo. Op Art and a History of Deception 1520–1970, Mumok, Vienna, 2019
- Victor Vasarely. In the Labyrinth of Modernism, Städel Museum Frankfurt, 2018
- Basquiat – Boom for Real, Schirn Kunsthalle Frankfurt, 2018
- It's All Happening So Fast, CCA – Canadian Centre for Architecture, Montreal 2017
- Imagine Moscow, Design Museum London 2017
- Triennale Kleinplastik, Fellbach 2016
- Painting 2.0 – Expression in the Information Age, Museum Brandhorst, Munich 2015 as well as Mumok, Vienna 2016
- Postwar: Art Between the Pacific and the Atlantic, 1945–1965, Haus der Kunst, Munich, 2016
- Harun Farocki. Labour in a Single Shot, Haus der Kulturen der Welt, Berlin 2015
- Experiments in Art and Technology, Museum der Moderne Salzburg 2015
- Das Bauhaus – Alles ist Design, Vitra Design Museum, Weil am Rhein 2015
- Hollein, MAK – Museum for Applied Arts, Vienna 2014
- Hans Hollein: Alles ist Architektur, Museum Abteiberg, Mönchengladbach 2014
- Living with Pop. A Reproduction of Capitalist Realism, Kunsthalle Düsseldorf 2013
- Mathias Poledna, Venice Biennale of Architecture, Venice 2013
- Giacometti. The Playing Fields, Hamburger Kunsthalle, 2013
- Komuna Fundamento, Venice Biennale of Architecture, Venice 2012
- Jeff Koons. The Sculptor, Liebieghaus, Frankfurt 2012
- VALIE EXPORT. Archiv, Kunsthaus Bregenz, 2011
- The Global Contemporary. Art Worlds After 1989, ZKM Museum of Contemporary Art, Karlsruhe 2011
- Carlo Mollino. Maniera Moderna, Haus der Kunst, Munich 2011
- Joseph Beuys. Parallelprozesse, Kunstsammlung Nordrhein-Westfalen, Düsseldorf 2010
- 100 Years (Version #1, Düsseldorf), Julia Stoschek Collection, Düsseldorf 2009
- Candida Höfer. Projects: Done, Museum Morsbroich, Leverkusen 2009, Museo de Arte Contemporanea de Vigo, 2010
- Manifesta 7, ex Palazzo delle Poste, Trient 2008
- Total Enlightenment. Moscow Conceptual Art 1960–1990, Schirn Kunsthalle, Frankfurt 2008
- Lucas Cranach the Elder, Städel Museum, Frankfurt 2007
- Insert 5 - Olaf Nicolai, Kunstverein in Hamburg, 2007
- Focus 03: Concept. Action. Language, Mumok, Vienna 2006
- Henri Matisse. Figur Farbe Raum, K20, Kunstsammlung Nordrhein-Westfalen, Düsseldorf 2005
- Rodin Beuys, Schirn Kunsthalle, Frankfurt 2005
- Momentary Monuments, Berlinische Galerie 2005
- Pop Reloaded. Michel Majerus, Hamburger Bahnhof – Nationalgalerie der Gegenwart, Berlin 2003
- Dream Factory Communism, Schirn Kunsthalle, Frankfurt 2003

== Publications (Selection) ==
- A Jewish Garden in the Gardens of the World Berlin, Berlin 2022, ISBN 978-3-86859-701-1
- Bauakademie Berlin, Raumgestaltung und Entwerfen TU Wien, Jovis Verlag Berlin 2021, ISBN 978-3-86859-701-1
- Saarlandmuseum – Moderne Galerie. The Extension. Stiftung Saarländischer Kulturbesitz, Saarbrücken 2017, ISBN 978-3-932036-85-9.
- Kuehn Malvezzi. Mousse Publishing, Milan 2013, ISBN 978-88-6749-039-4.
- Typen. Ein Raumatlas. (Sonderausgabe Displayer). Ausstellungsdesign und kuratorische Praxis. Karlsruhe 2012, ISBN 978-3-930194-12-4.
- Displayer 03 HfG Karlsruhe, Ausstellungsdesign und kuratorische Praxis. Karlsruhe 2009, ISBN 978-3-930194-09-4.
- Candida Hoefer. Kuehn Malvezzi. Verlag Walther König, Köln 2009, ISBN 978-3-86560-637-2.
- Displayer 02 HfG Karlsruhe, Ausstellungsdesign und kuratorische Praxis. Karlsruhe 2008, ISBN 978-3-930194-07-0.
- Kuehn Malvezzi. Exhibition Catalogue, Aedes West. Berlinische Galerie, Berlin 2005, ISBN 3-937093-48-6.
- Michael S. Riedel: Kuehn Malvezzi, Exhibition Catalogue, Aedes West, Berlinische Galerie Berlin. Revolver-Verlag, Frankfurt am Main 2005, ISBN 3-86588-111-4.
- Behles & Jochimsen, Oda Paelmke, Tobias Engelschall, Jessen + Vollenweider, Kuehn Malvezzi: Berlin shrink to fit. Exhibition Catalogue, Revolver, Frankfurt 2005, ISBN 3-86588-216-1.
- Friedrich Christian Flick Collection im Hamburger Bahnhof. Kuehn Malvezzi - a Space for Contemporary Art. Junius Verlag, Hamburg 2004, ISBN 3-88506-552-5.
