= House of One =

Ecumenical place of worship in Berlin, Germany, under construction

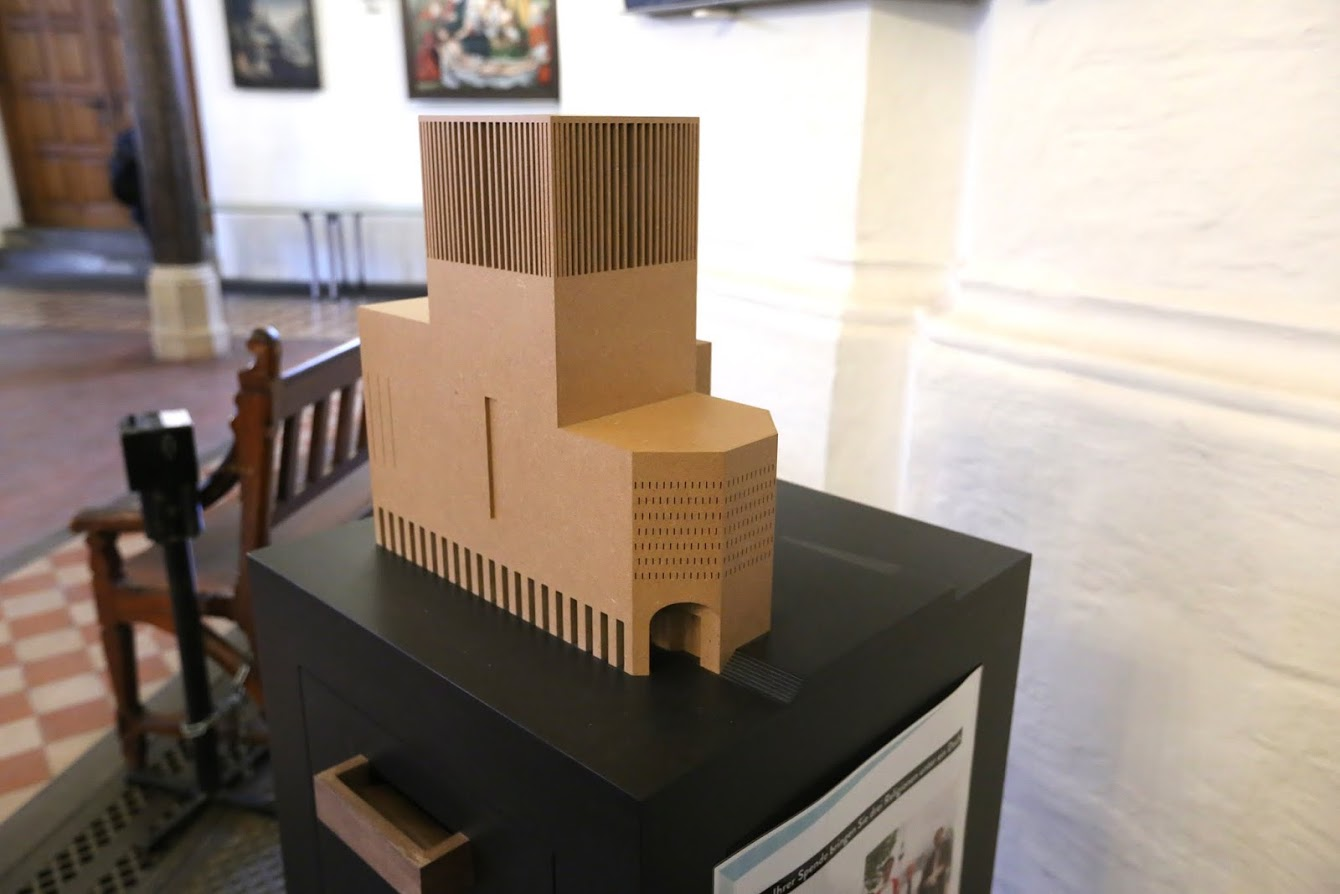
- A model of the proposed building

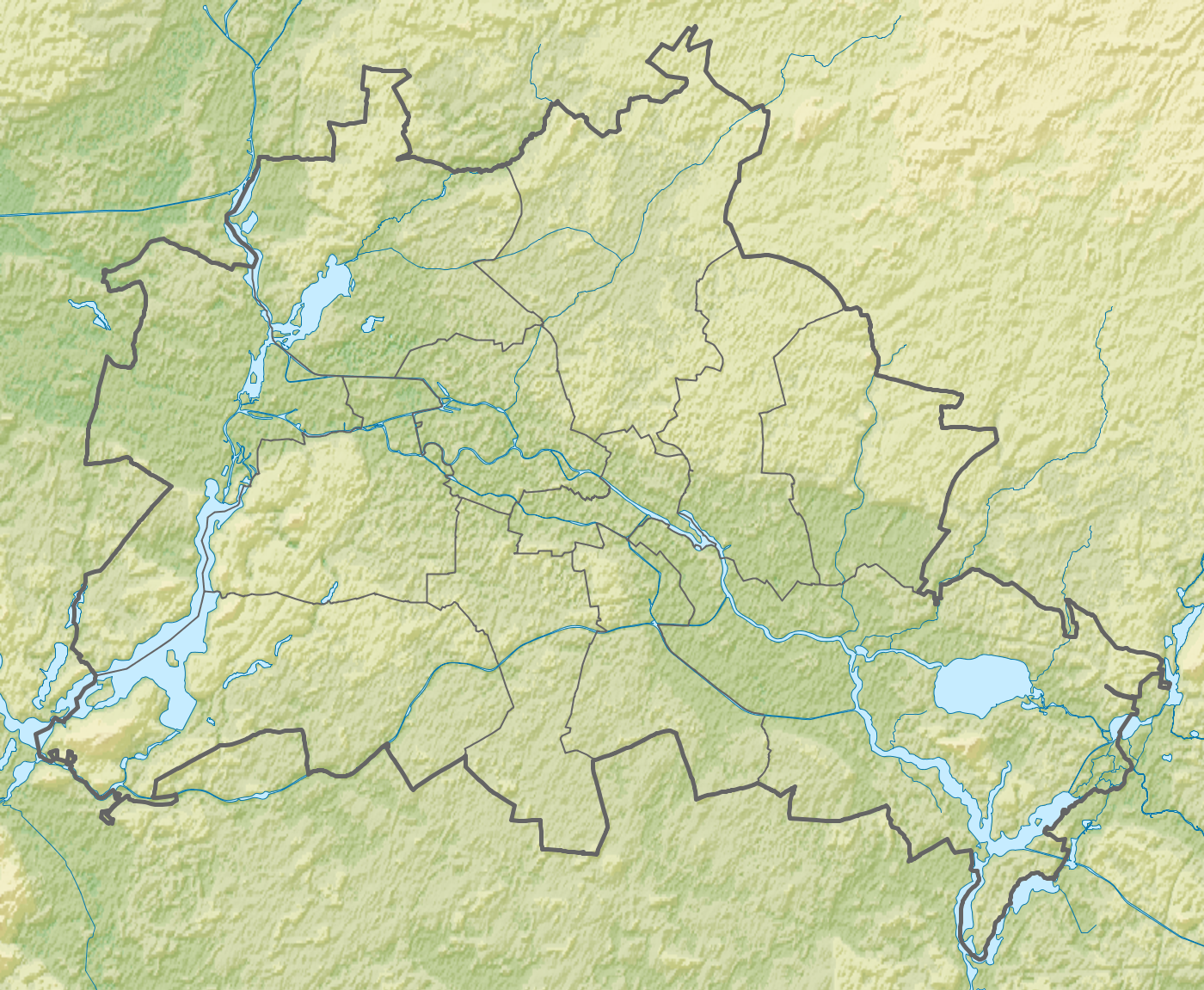
- Location of the building in Berlin

Religion
- Affiliation: Ecumenical: Protestantism; Judaism; Islam
- Status: Under construction (as of June 2024)

Location
- Location: Petriplatz, Leipziger Strasse, Fischerinsel, Berlin
- Country: Germany
- Interactive map of House of One

Architecture
- Architect: Kuehn Malvezzi
- Type: Sacral architecture
- Style: Modernist
- Height (max): 46 m (151 ft) (when complete)

Website
- house-of-one.org/en

The House of One is an ecumenical religious structure being built in Petriplatz, on Leipziger Strasse, Fischerinsel, Berlin, Germany. When completed, the building will be a house of prayer for three religions, containing a church, a mosque, and a synagogue. (Note: Despite claims to the be the world's first building accommodating multiple faiths, the House of Religions in Bern, Switzerland, opened in 2014, and the Tri-Faith Initiative in Omaha, Nebraska, opened in 2020. The Temple of All Religions in Kazan, Russia, and the Abrahamic Family House in Abu Dhabi, U.A.E., were also under construction, as of February 2021.) Colloquially, the building is called a churmosqagogue.

== Overview ==
The structure was designed by Kuehn Malvezzi in the Modernist style, and is being built on the site where St Peter's Church, (German: Petrikirche) a 13th-century Protestant church, the first in Berlin, was located from approximately 800 years. The church and associated square were heavily damaged during World War II and the former church was subsequently demolished in 1964 by the East German communist regime.

The foundation stone was laid in May 2021. The project is expected to cost €47 million, of which the German Federal Government has provided €20 million, €10 million from the Berlin state government, €9 million via major donations, and the remainder through a broad community fundraising appeal.

== Gallery ==
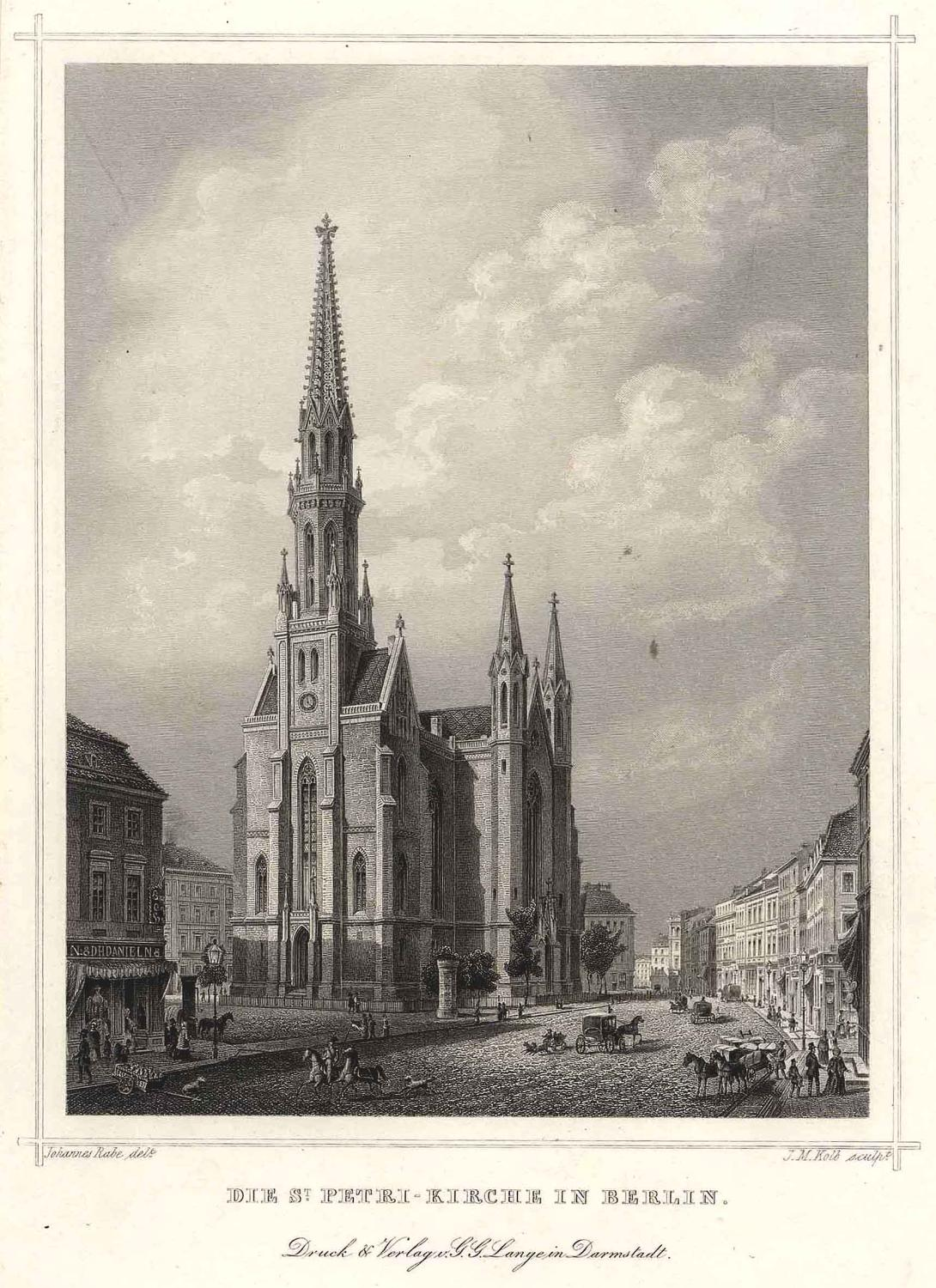
St Peter's Church in the 19th century

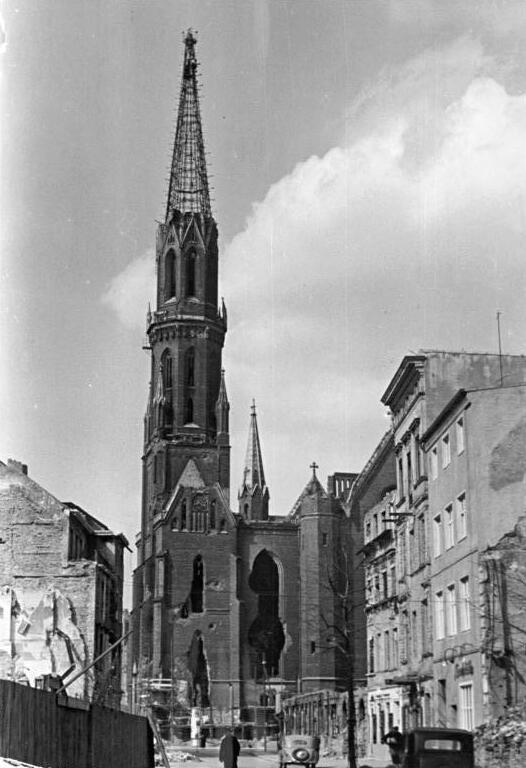
The ruins of St Peter's Church, 1951

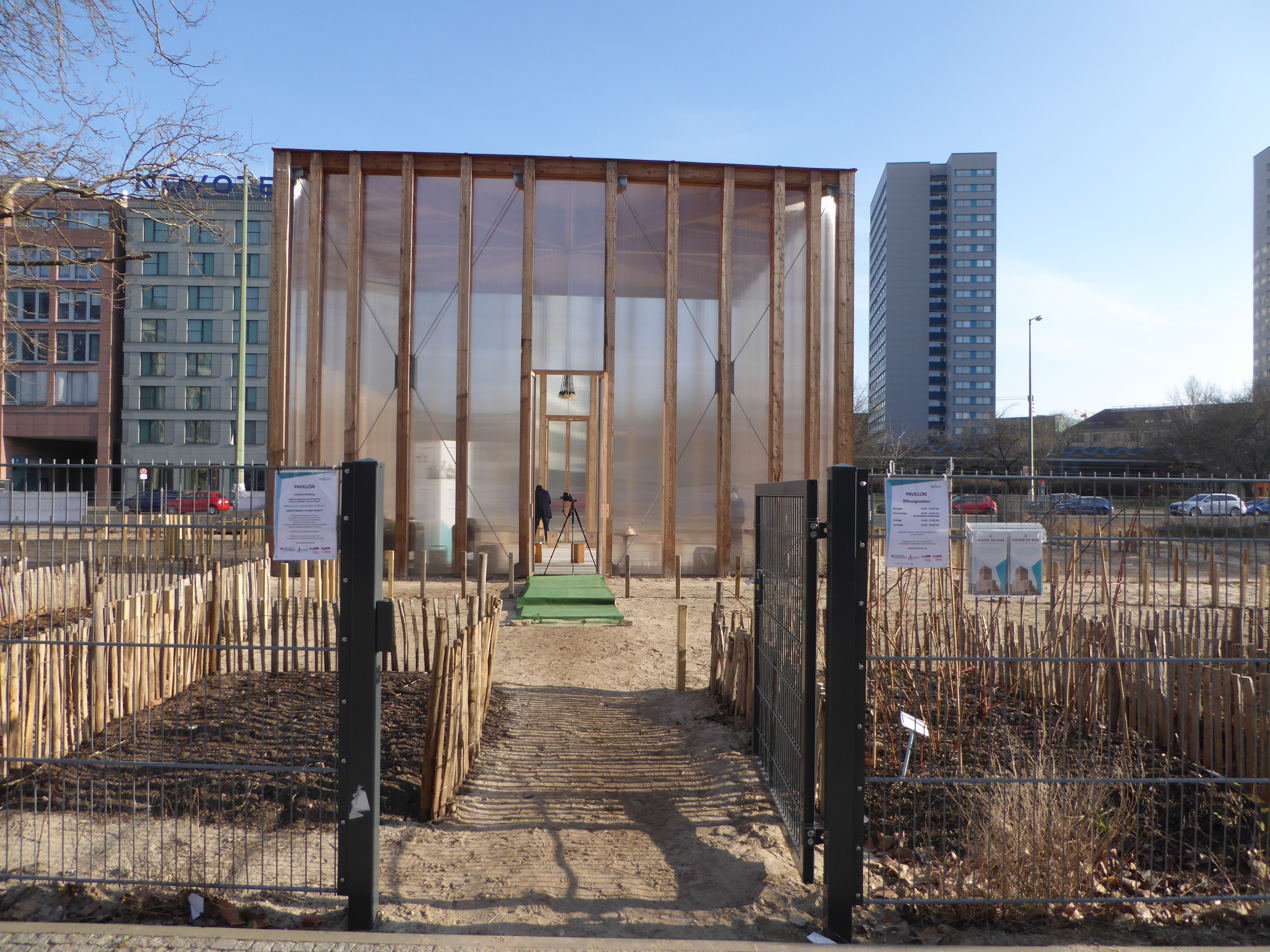
Publicity pavilion in the planned central space

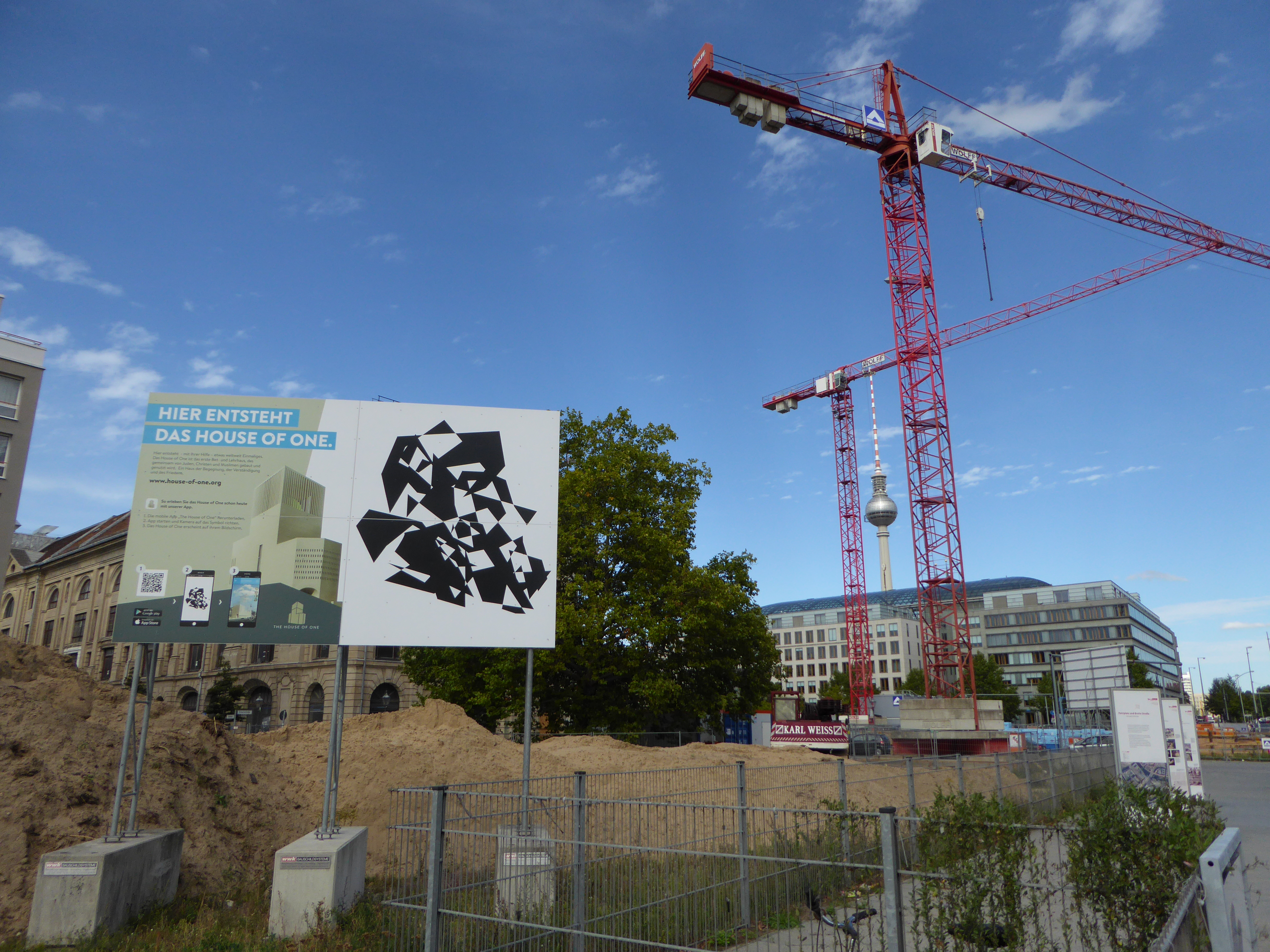
Building site, with Fernsehturm Berlin

== See also ==
- History of the Jews in Germany
- List of places of worship in Berlin
- List of mosques in Germany
- List of synagogues in Germany (in German)
