= Bettina Moissi =

German stage and film actress (1923–2023)

- Born: 15 October 1923; Berlin, Germany
- Died: 21 November 2023 (aged 100); Zurich, Switzerland
- Occupation: Actress
- Years active: 1941–1950 (film)
- Spouse: Heinz Berggruen
- Children: Olivier Berggruen; Nicolas Berggruen
- Parent(s): Aleksandër Moisiu; Herta Hambach

Bettina Moissi (15 October 1923 – 21 November 2023) was a German stage and film actress. She played the character Victorine in the 1941 film The Comedians.

== Biography ==
Bettina Moissi was born in Berlin on 15 October 1923, the second child of leading stage actor Aleksandër Moisiu. Her father was often branded as Jewish due to his name (which translates as "Moses") and his outspoken defense of his fellow Jewish actors and people during a period of growing antisemitism. She was Catholic but was married to Heinz Berggruen who was Jewish.

== Personal life ==
In 1960, she married the art collector Heinz Berggruen. He predeceased her in 2007. They had two children:

- Olivier Berggruen, curator at the Schirn Kunsthalle Frankfurt, Germany
- Nicolas Berggruen, a financier and art collector

Moissi died in Zurich on 21 November 2023, at the age of 100.

== Selected filmography ==
- The Comedians (1941) as Victorine
- Jakko (1941) as Petja
- In Those Days (1947) as Marie
- The Original Sin (1948) as Eva Meier-Eden
- Long Is the Road (1948) as Dora Berkowicz
- The Orplid Mystery (1950) as Leata

== Bibliography ==
- Shandley, Robert R. Rubble Films: German Cinema in the Shadow of the Third Reich. Temple University Press, 2001.
