= Long Is the Road (film) =

1948 film

- Directed by: Herbert B. Fredersdorf; Marek Goldstein
- Written by: Israel Becker; Karl Georg Külb
- Produced by: Abraham Weinstein
- Starring: Israel Becker; Bettina Moissi; Berta Litwina
- Cinematography: Jakob Jonilowicz; Franz Koch
- Music by: Lothar Brühne
- Production company: International Film Organization
- Release dates: September 1, 1948 (Germany); November 11, 1948 (US); March 18, 1949 (Israel)
- Running time: 77 minutes
- Country: Germany
- Languages: German; Polish; Yiddish
- Budget: £20,000

Long Is the Road (German: Lang ist der Weg, Yiddish: Lang iz der Veg) is a 1948 German drama film directed by Herbert B. Fredersdorf and Marek Goldstein and starring Israel Becker, Bettina Moissi and Berta Litwina. The story examines the Holocaust from the perspective of a Polish Jewish family and a young man who is able to escape while he is transported to a concentration camp. The film was made during the summer of 1947. It was the first German-made film to directly portray the Holocaust (Morituri was released earlier but made later). It was made with the support of the US Army Information Control Division. It was partly shot at the Bavaria Studios in Munich with sets designed by the art director Carl Ludwig Kirmse.

== History ==
A major aim of the film was to lobby for Jewish survivors still living in Displaced Persons (DP) camps to be allowed to emigrate to the British Mandate of Palestine. It drew a comparison between the plight of the Jewish population and the sufferings of other Europeans who had ended up in DP camps. This was partly done through the principal character's romantic relationship with Dora, a Jewish holocaust survivor. The film employs a semi-documentary technique to tell its story. Many of its themes were similar to other German rubble films of the era, but it was notably different partly because of its advocacy of an optimistic, idealistic new world in Palestine. The film only ever went on a limited release, and by the time it received its German première, many inhabitants of the DP camps had been re-settled, with large numbers emigrating to the newly founded state of Israel. In 1996 the film was made available to wider audience when the National Center for Jewish Film restored and re-released it.

== Plot summary ==
David, the protagonist, escapes into the countryside from the transport from Warsaw Ghetto to Auschwitz and joins the partisans. After the liberation of Poland he searches for his mother, in vain, meets Dora, they move to the DP camp in Landsberg, they are married, he finally finds his mother, and in the end they are in a kibbutz in the land of Israel.

== Cast ==
- Israel Becker as David Jelin
- Bettina Moissi as Dora Berkowicz
- Berta Litwina as Hanne Jelin
- Jakob Fischer as Jakob Jelin
- Otto Wernicke as Senior Doctor
- Paul Dahlke as 2nd Doctor
- Aleksander Bardini as Peasant
- David Hart as Mr. Liebermann
- Misha Natan as Partisan
- Heinz-Leo Fischer as Chodetzki

== Bibliography ==
- Shandley, Robert R. Rubble Films: German Cinema in the Shadow of the Third Reich. Temple University Press, 2001.
