= Council on the Future of Europe =

Think tank for the political union of Europe

Council for the Future of Europe is a think tank, established in September 2011, initiated and supported by the Nicolas Berggruen Institute as one of its projects, in its manifesto calling for a political union of Europe:

...It will be necessary to further lay out a vision of a federation that goes beyond a fiscal and economic mandate to include a common security, energy, climate, immigration and foreign policy as well as develop a common narrative about the future of the union and its place in the world...
...Nation states will need to share certain dimensions of sovereignty to a central European entity that would have the capacity to source revenue at the federal level in order to provide European-wide public goods...

— https://www.yanisvaroufakis.eu/2011/09/08/on-the-newly-established-council-for-the-future-of-europes-manifesto-an-assessment/

It aims to:

...recommend a way forward and then lobby for that course at the European Commission, the Council and Parliament as well as with the leaders of individual members states...

— https://www.yanisvaroufakis.eu/2011/09/08/on-the-newly-established-council-for-the-future-of-europes-manifesto-an-assessment/
