= Nathan Gardels =

American journalist

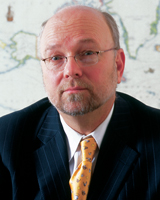
- Born: December 22, 1952 (age 73)
- Education: University of California, Los Angeles (BA, MA)

Nathan Gardels (born December 22, 1952) is an American journalist and editor-in-chief of Noema Magazine. He is also the co-founder of and a senior adviser to the Berggruen Institute. He previously served as editor-in-chief of The WorldPost, a partnership with The Washington Post, as well as editor-in-chief of Global Viewpoint Network and Nobel Laureates Plus, both services of the Los Angeles Times Syndicate/Tribune Media). From 1985 to 2014 he also was editor of New Perspectives Quarterly, the journal of social and political thought published by Blackwell/Oxford.

== Journalism career ==
Nathan Gardels has been editor of New Perspectives Quarterly since it began publishing in 1985. He has served as editor of Global Viewpoint, Global Economic Viewpoint and Nobel Laureates Plus since 1989. In 2014, Gardels became the editor-in-chief of The WorldPost, a digital publication stemming from a partnership between the Washington Post and the Berggruen Institute. In 2020, The WorldPost evolved into a digital and print magazine called Noema, which covers philosophy, geopolitics, economics, technology and culture. Gardels is the editor-in-chief of Noema Magazine, published by the Berggruen Institute.

Gardels has written for The Wall Street Journal, Los Angeles Times, New York Times, Washington Post, Harper's, U.S. News & World Report and New York Review of Books. He has also written for foreign publications, including Corriere della Sera, El Pais, Le Figaro, Yomiuri Shimbun, O’Estado de Sao Paulo, the Guardian, Die Welt and many others.

== Institutional affiliations ==
From 1983 to 1985, Gardels was executive director of the Institute for National Strategy where he conducted policy research at the USA-Canada Institute in Moscow, the People's Institute of Foreign Affairs in Beijing, the Swedish Institute in Stockholm, and the Friedrich Ebert Stiftung in Bonn. Prior to this, he spent four years as adviser to Governor Jerry Brown of California on economic affairs, with an emphasis on public investment, trade issues, the Pacific Basin and Mexico.

Since 1986, Gardels has been a Media Fellow of the World Economic Forum (Davos). He has lectured at the Islamic Educational, Scientific and Cultural Organization (ISESCO) in Rabat, Morocco, and the Chinese Academy of Social Sciences in Beijing, China. Gardels was also a founding member at the New Delhi meeting of Intellectuels du Monde. Gardels has been a long-standing member of the Council on Foreign Relations. He is a senior fellow at the UCLA School of Public Affairs and a senior adviser at the Berggruen Institute. Since January 2014, he has served as editor-in-chief of The WorldPost.

== Books ==
Gardels is the author of several books, including:

- At Century's End (Alti/McGraw Hill, 1996)
- The Changing Global Order: World Leaders Reflect (Wiley-Blackwell, 1997)
- American Idol After Iraq: Competing for Hearts and Minds in the Global Media Age, with Mike Medavoy (Wiley-Blackwell, 2009)
- Intelligent Governance for the 21st Century: A Middle Way Between West and East, with Nicolas Berggruen. A Financial Times best book of 2012
- Renovating Democracy: Governing in the Age of Globalization and Digital Capitalism, with Nicolas Berggruen (University of California Press, 2019)

== Personal ==
Gardels holds degrees in Theory and Comparative Politics and in Architecture and Urban Planning from UCLA. He lives in Los Angeles with his wife, Lilly, and two sons, Carlos and Alexander.
