= Olivier Berggruen =

German-American art historian and curator

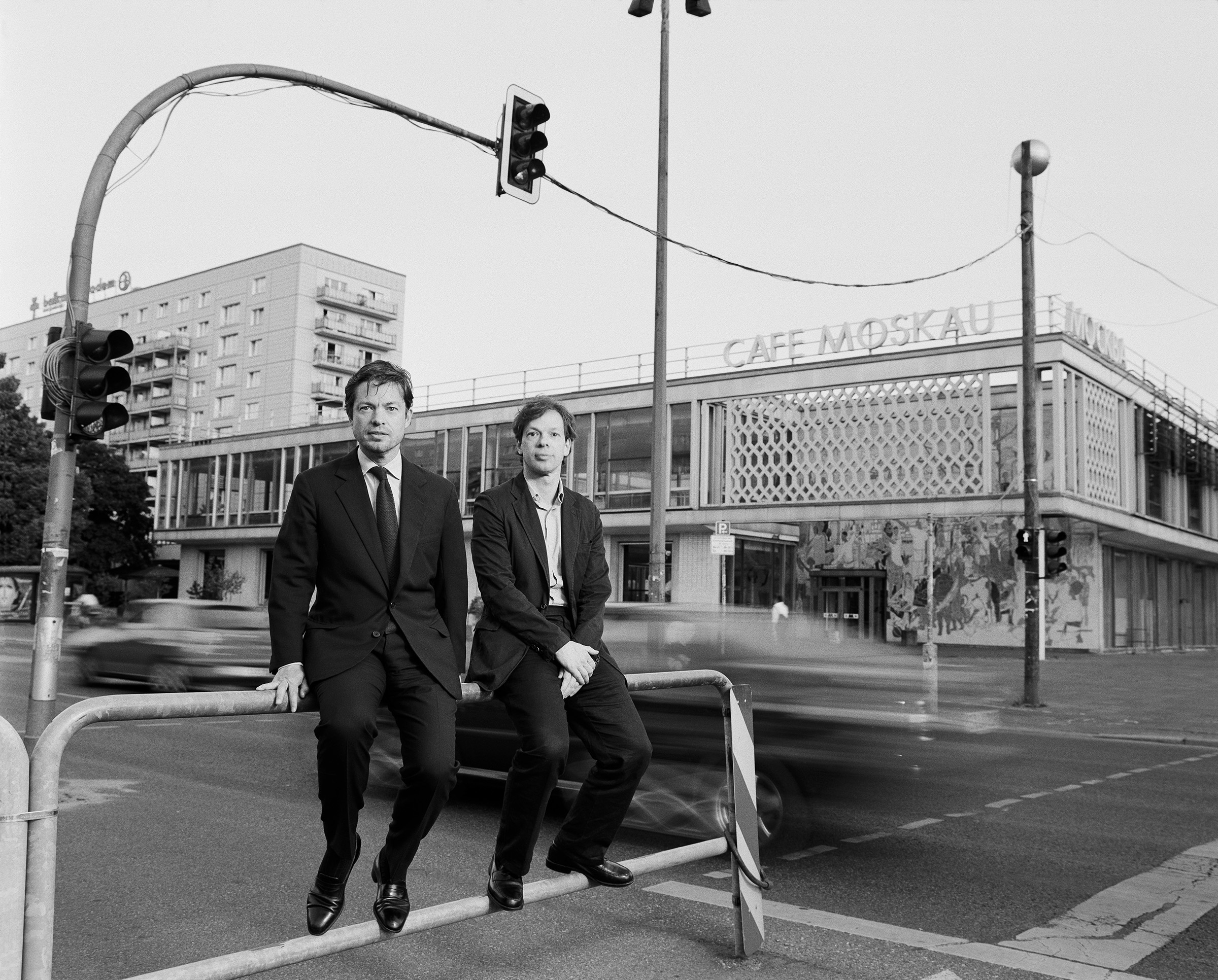
- Nicolas Berggruen and Olivier Berggruen photographed by Oliver Mark, Berlin 2008
- Born: Olivier Berggruen; 14 September 1963 (age 63); Winterthur, Switzerland
- Citizenship: United States; Germany
- Education: École alsacienne Brown University (AB); Courtauld Institute of Art (AM); University of London (AM)
- Occupations: Art historian, curator
- Political party: Democratic
- Spouse: Desiree Hayford-Welsing (m. 1998)
- Children: 2
- Parents: Heinz Berggruen (father); Bettina Moissi (mother)
- Relatives: Nicolas Berggruen (brother); John Berggruen (half-brother); Helen Berggruen (half-sister)
- Website: Official website

Olivier Berggruen (born 14 September 1963) is a German-American art historian and curator, described by the Wall Street Journal as playing "a pivotal role in the art world."

== Early life and education ==
Born in Winterthur, Switzerland, Berggruen is the son of noted German art collector Heinz Berggruen and actress Bettina Moissi. He graduated from Brown University in Providence, Rhode Island, and completed his graduate studies at the Courtauld Institute of Art at the University of London, where he studied with Anita Brookner, who was his advisor.

== Career ==
He briefly worked at the auction house Sotheby's in London, before serving as curator at the Schirn Kunsthalle in Frankfurt. He has lectured at numerous institutions, including Carnegie Mellon University, the Frick Collection, The National Gallery in London, the National Gallery of Art in Washington, D. C., the 92nd Street Y, the National Gallery of Canada, NYU's Global Institute for Advanced Study, and the Paris Institute of Political Studies. He served as committee chairman of the Thomas J. Watson Library at the Metropolitan Museum of Art, and was the recipient of the 2009 Berliner Zeitung Media Award.

Berggruen has curated a number of international exhibitions, such as a retrospective of Yves Klein at the Guggenheim Museum in Bilbao and one of Beatrice Caracciolo at the French Academy in Rome. He is a contributor to the Huffington Post, for which he writes articles on art, literature, and philosophy. Additionally, he has written extensively on Picasso, Yves Klein, and Henri Matisse, among others, for organizations including the Solomon R. Guggenheim Museum in New York, publications such as Artforum and The Print Quarterly, and for Gagosian Gallery, for which he contributed with University of Cambridge professor Mary Jacobus. His first book, The Writing of Art, is a series of essays, which explores aesthetics through the lens of twentieth-century art, tracing movements and trends such as the ontological discontinuity of modernism in Picasso's ballets. In 2016, the Italian government commissioned Berggruen to curate an exhibition to celebrate the centennial of Picasso's Italian journey. “Picasso: From Cubism to Classicism, 1915 to 1925,” was held at Rome's Scuderie del Quirinale from September 22, 2017, through January 21st, 2018. In 2019, he co-curated an exhibition on Picasso and antiquity at the Goulandris Museum of Cycladic Art in Athens, which won a 2019 Global Fine Art Award.

Berggruen was guest editor for the July/August 2020 edition of The Brooklyn Rail, and in 2021 curated a Picasso exhibition at Acquavella Galleries. He is an artistic adviser to the Menuhin Festival Gstaad.

In 2024, Berggruen’s book Formes du désir: Une brève histoire de la collection d’art, was published in French. In 2025 he curated the exhibition The Seven Heavenly Senses, at the Al Thani Collection at Hôtel de la Marine in Paris.

== Personal life ==
Berggruen lives in New York City with his wife, Desiree, whom he met while both were studying at Brown. She is a physician, and together they have two children, Tobias and Ana. Berggruen has additional homes in Paris and Gstaad, Switzerland. His brother is billionaire and philanthropist Nicolas Berggruen; he additionally has two half-siblings, John, a San Francisco-based art dealer, and Helen, a painter. He serves on various committees at institutions across the world, including Brown University, the Metropolitan Museum of Art, the Tate Modern, Picasso Museum in Paris, Courtauld Institute, Museum Berggruen, and Mariinsky Ballet. He additionally sits on the Board of Trustees of Carnegie Hall, the Berggruen Institute, and Brown University's John Carter Brown Library. He has also donated to the campaigns of several Democratic Party candidates, including Barack Obama and Alexandria Ocasio-Cortez.

== Selected publications ==
- The Writing of Art, Pushkin Press, 2012.
- "The Fragmented Self" in Dieter Buchart ed., Jean-Michel Basquiat: Now's the Time, Prestel, 2015.
- "The Theater as Metaphor" in Olivier Berggruen and Max Hollein eds., Picasso and the Theater, Hantje Cantz, 2007.
- Editor (with Max Holbein), Henri Matisse: Drawing with Scissors: Masterpieces from the Late Years, Prestel, 2006.
- “Ed Ruscha: Ribbon of Words” in Ed Ruscha: The Drawn Word, Edited with Essay, Windsor Press (2004), pp. 1 – 7
- “The Prints of Jean-Michel Basquiat”, Print Quarterly, XXVI (2009): pp. 28 – 38
- “The Future of Painting” in Portraits Lost in Space: George Condo, Pace Wildenstein, New York (1999), pp. 30 – 34
- “The Realm of Pure Sensations” in Playing With Form: Neoconcrete Art From Brazil, Edited with Essay, Dickinson New York (2011), pp. 19 – 27
- “Picasso & Bacon: Painting the Other Self” in Francis Bacon and the Tradition of Art, Edited by Wilfried Seipel, Barbara Steffen, Christoph Vitali, Skira Editore S.p.A. (2003), pp. 71 – 83
- “The Summons to Living Things to Return Home” in Cy Twombly: Bacchus, Gagosian Gallery, 2005, pp. 5 –15
- “The Landscape of the Mind” in Agnes Martin, Thomas Ammann Fine Art AG Zurich (2008)
