= Heinz Berggruen =

German and American art dealer and collector

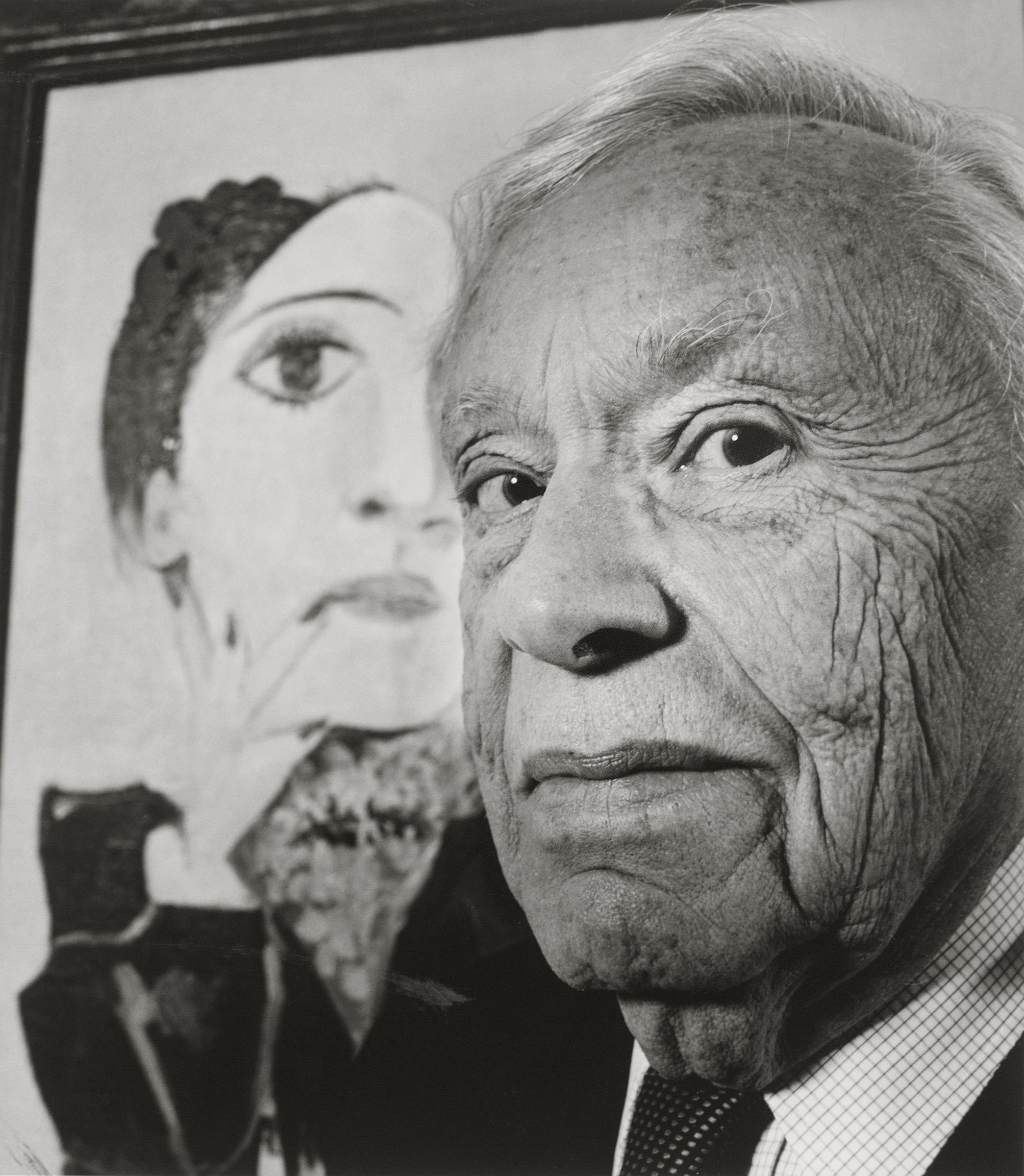
- Heinz Berggruen photographed by Oliver Mark in front of Pablo Picasso's Dora Maar with green nails from 1936 (Berlin 2000)
- Born: Heinz Berggruen; January 6, 1914; Wilmersdorf, Berlin, German Empire
- Died: February 23, 2007 (aged 93); American Hospital, Neuilly-sur-Seine, France
- Occupations: Art dealer and collector
- Known for: Providing art collection to form Berggruen Museum
- Spouses: Lillian S. Zellerbach (m. 1939; div. 1945) Bettina Moissi (m. 1960)
- Children: John; Helen; Olivier; Nicolas

Heinz Berggruen (January 6, 1914 – February 23, 2007) was a German and American art dealer and collector who sold 165 works of art to the German federal government to form the core of the Berggruen Museum in Berlin, Germany. He was the father of John, Helen, Olivier and Nicolas Berggruen.

== Early life and education ==
Berggruen was born in Wilmersdorf, Berlin to Jewish parents: Ludwig Berggruen, a businessman who owned an office supply business before the war, and Antonie (née Zadek). He attended the Goethe-Gymnasium in Wilmersdorf and graduated from the Friedrich-Wilhelms (now Humboldt) University in 1932, where he read literature. After 1933, he continued his studies at the universities of Grenoble and Toulouse.

== Career ==
He contributed free-lance articles to the Frankfurter Zeitung, the forerunner of today's Frankfurter Allgemeine Zeitung. He got around the restrictions on Jewish contributors by submitting his pieces through a colleague and signing them with his initials, H. B., rather than his full, Jewish-sounding surname. He fled Germany in 1936.

=== Immigration to the United States ===
Berggruen immigrated to the United States in 1936 and studied German literature at University of California, Berkeley. After working as an art critic for the San Francisco Chronicle, in 1939 he became an "assistant to the director" at the San Francisco Museum of Modern Art. There, he helped to prepare an exhibition about the Mexican painter Diego Rivera. Later, in New York in 1940, he met Frida Kahlo with whom he had a short love affair. That same year he says that he bought his first picture for $100 while honeymooning in Chicago. It was a watercolour by Paul Klee, and he bought it from a Jewish refugee in need of money. While living in California, Berggruen was a student of the painter David Park.

After the Second World War Berggruen returned to Europe as member of the U.S. Army and worked briefly on the American-sponsored paper Heute in Munich (located in the same building where the novelist Erich Kästner worked). He then moved to Paris, where he worked in the fine arts division of UNESCO, run by his former boss at the San Francisco museum, Grace Morley. In 1947, he opened a small bookshop on the Île Saint-Louis, specializing in illustrated books and later lithographs. In the early 1950s, he became acquainted with Tristan Tzara, who introduced him to Pablo Picasso in Paris. By the late 1950s, he had become an important dealer in Picasso prints, as well as in second-hand Picasso paintings. His renowned art collection, which he valued at $450 million in 2001, included 165 works by 20th-century masters such as Braque, Matisse, Klee, and Giacometti, with a unique group of 85 works by Picasso.

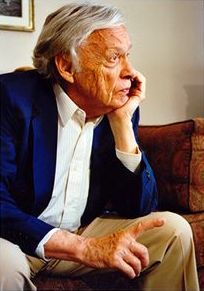
Berggruen in 2002

In 1977, Berggruen published Douglas Cooper's catalogue raisonné of Juan Gris. He finally resigned as director of the Paris gallery in 1980 in order to devote himself to collecting and dealing. In 1988, he donated 90 Klee works to the Metropolitan Museum of Art in New York, although he later expressed fear that his donation would go unnoticed in the museum's own vast collections. The donation "made the Metropolitan the second most important Klee repository in the world, after the Kunstmuseum in Klee's native Switzerland," according to Michael Gross. That same year, he exhibited his collection at the Musée d'Art et d'Histoire in Geneva. In 1990, he lent a good part of his collection to the National Gallery in London, where he exhibited works—including Seurat's landmark painting Les Poseuses (1886)—until 2001. In 1995, the German government lent him an apartment in Berlin and gave him an art museum opposite the Charlottenburg Palace. The collection, then comprising 118 works, opened to the public in 1997. At the time, then German culture minister Ulrich Roloff-Momin described it as "the most meaningful art transfer in Berlin's post-war history." In 2000, he finally sold the art collection to the Prussian Cultural Heritage Foundation: the collection of 165 works (including 85 Picassos), which Berggruen valued at €750m, was purchased by the PCHF at about a quarter of that value. It additionally includes over sixty works by Paul Klee, and twenty by Matisse.

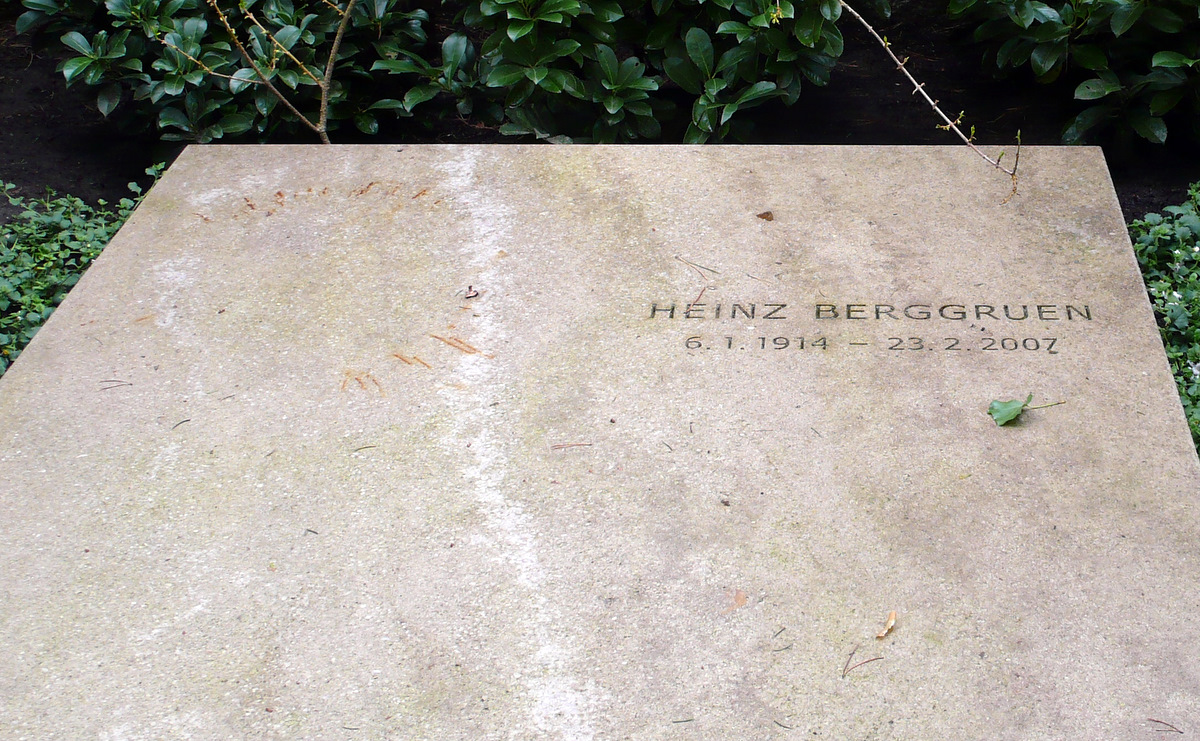
His tomb in Berlin

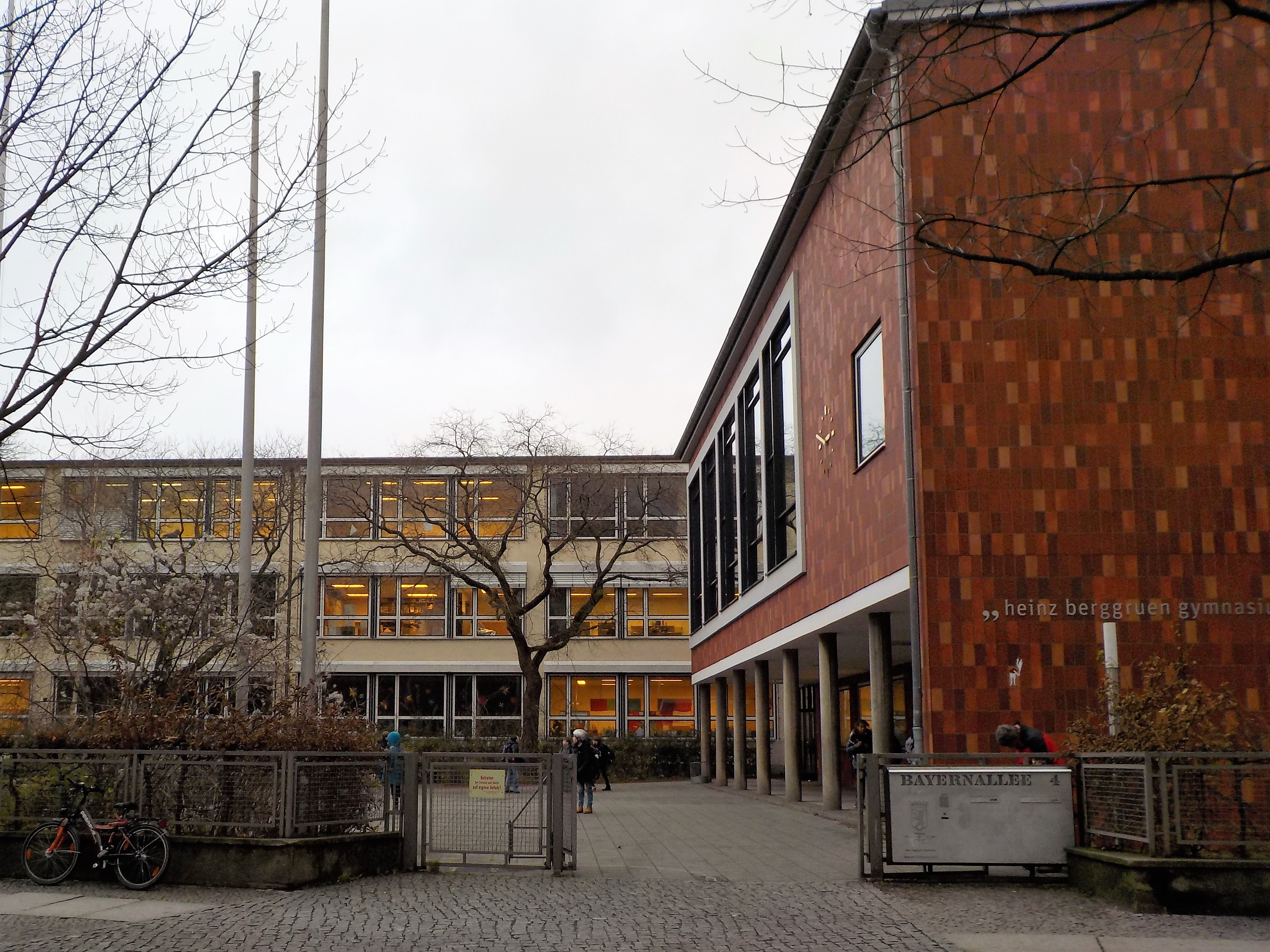
Heinz-Berggruen-Gymnasium in Berlin

For his achievements, Berggruen was named a Commandeur of the Legion of Honour by the French government, received the Grand Cross of the Order of Merit of the Federal Republic of Germany in 1999, and was named an honorary citizen of Berlin. He additionally received the Jewish Museum Berlin's Award for Understanding and Tolerance in 2005, and was bestowed an honorary Doctorate of Humane Letters from Adelphi University in 1993. In 2008, a Berlin school was named the Heinz-Berggruen-Gymnasium in his honor. An honorary trustee of the Metropolitan Museum, he additionally served on the board of the Berlin Philharmonic.

In 2016, Berggruen's Klee collection was exhibited in its entirety to inaugurate the Met Breuer, and traveled to the National Gallery of Canada in 2018.

== Personal life ==
Berggruen was married twice and had four children. Berggruen, who until his death maintained homes in Paris, Gstaad, and Berlin (and in Geneva and New York before that), was quoted as saying "I am neither French nor German, I am European. I'd very much like to think there was a European nationality, but I think I may be dreaming." Through his mother, Antonie Zadek, Berggruen was a cousin of the opera singer Hilde Zadek (1917–2019).

- In 1939, Berggruen married the American Lillian Zellerbach. They divorced in 1945. They had two children:
  - John Berggruen, owner of the Berggruen Gallery in San Francisco and active in the Bay Area art scene since 1970;
  - Helen Berggruen, a San Francisco-based artist
- In 1960, he married the German actress Bettina Moissi, a Catholic of Albanian and German descent. They had two children:
  - Olivier Berggruen, art historian and curator
  - Nicolas Berggruen, a financier and art collector

== Death ==
Berggruen died at the American Hospital of Paris in Neuilly-sur-Seine on 23 February 2007. At his own wish he was buried in the forest cemetery in Waldfriedhof Dahlem, in Berlin. His funeral was attended by German chancellor Angela Merkel, and then-president Horst Köhler, among others.
