= Michael Gregory (artist) =

American painter

- Born: 1955 (age 70–71); Los Angeles, CA, US
- Education: San Francisco Art Institute
- Known for: Painting, printmaking
- Style: Representational, landscape
- Spouse: Lucy Van Sands Seeburg

Michael Gregory, Floating World, oil on canvas on panel, 62" x 56", 2020.

Michael Gregory (born 1955) is an American artist known for paintings of Western landscapes, barns and silos, and flowers. His images, while detailed and realist in appearance, are composites of real-world locales and objects painted from imagination, observation and memory. Critics suggest that unlike many contemporary realists or other landscapists, Gregory avoids nostalgia, traditional notions of verity and authenticity, or irony. They characterize his paintings as mythic, allegorical vehicles for metaphysical reflection on human experience and the interior essence of places, things and ideas. Ann Lauterbach writes that he employs landscape as "a mode of human thought and imagination, dense with cultural markers and historical significance, as real as it is imagined. The American West, Gregory seems to be telling us, is in fact, an illusion, a phantom, a construct."

Gregory's art is held in the collections of the San Jose Museum of Art, Tacoma Art Museum, Boise Art Museum and Denver Art Museum, among others. He has exhibited at venues including the de Young Museum, San Jose Institute of Contemporary Art, Arkansas Art Center, Hunter Museum of American Art and Butler Institute of American Art. After living in Bolinas, California for several decades, Gregory is based in Rhinebeck, New York.

== Early life and education ==
Gregory was born in Los Angeles in 1955. He studied painting at the San Francisco Art Institute, completing a BFA in 1980. After graduating, he was inspired by road trips through California's flat Central Valley to return to an earlier interest in landscape influenced by Dutch masters and 19th-century American painters Martin Johnson Heade, George Inness and Albert Pinkham Ryder.

== Work and reception ==
Critics note as hallmarks of Gregory's art its rich color glazes and varnished surfaces, dynamic brushwork, meticulous detail and distinctive approach to light, often characterized as otherworldly or unnatural. According to Kenneth Baker, "Art historical echoes are strong in [Gregory's] paintings, which look like Color Field abstractions into which figuration has been introduced." Writers cite Dutch still-life and High Renaissance painting, Romantic landscapists Caspar David Friedrich and J. M. W. Turner, Monet, the American Precisionists, Edward Hopper and Mark Rothko as influences on Gregory.

Michael Gregory, As If Twelve Princes Sat Before A King, oil and tar on wood panel, 40" x 84", 1989.

Gregory's invented landscapes derive from multiple sources and sites—imagination, memory, sketches, snapshots and observations from road trips, even studio models. Some critics liken their fabricated status to still lifes composed in terms of abstract planes and colors or Hollywood set constructions—convincing in their familiarity and detail, yet unsettling upon close inspection, with aspects revealed to be vaguely awry. Frank Bergon notes that the images are not "site-specific"; they skirt the particularity of realistic description in terms of moment, weather, light, season and position. Incommensurate pictorial cues often appear (unexplained light sources, foliage from different seasons, bent rules for rendering single-point perspective and distance), resulting in an iconic, sometimes surreal sense of both timelessness and the passage of time, immutability and stillness.

In a similar fashion, Gregory's figureless, rural scenes are said to sidestep the familiar, comforting syntax of the pastoral, favoring contemplation of the unassimilated otherness and predominance of nature. These paintings convey themes of human isolation, impermanence and loss—as well as exploration and hard-won survival—with human references often small and vulnerable in relation to cosmos, and possibly extinct (e.g., Floating World, 2020). Bill Berkson writes, "[Gregory's] subject is nature as an excess that defies any concept of necessity. It is neither a picturesque garden nor an innocent victim of human management. It is not an art object."

=== Bodies of work and exhibitions ===
In his early career, Gregory received attention for large, dramatic landscapes merging romanticism and expressionism, which explored nature's turbulence with a sense of "Wagnerian melancholia filled with implications of cataclysm, danger and aggression," according to critic Maria Porges. The paintings featured feverishly painted haystacks, pumpkins and tangles of bare branches that ominously dominated wintry, twilit compositions while emitting eerie illumination (e.g., A Gathering, 1986). In the late 1980s, he turned to invented, horizontal panoramas depicting dramatic conditions of atmosphere and light with narrow, low-horizon bands of land. Bill Berkson attributed their "otherworldly" quality in part to Gregory's antiquarian technique using chiaroscuro glazes and varnished tar (e.g., As If Twelve Princes Sat Before A King, 1988).

Michael Gregory, For Vandy, oil on wood panel, 12” x 8”, 2006.

In 1992, Gregory turned from grand vistas to introspective, elegiac paintings and prints that recalled 16th- and 17th-century vanitas symbolizing the transitory nature of life. They ranged from iconic images of single tulips, orchids and pieces of fruit to funereal, all-over compositions of rosebushes and tabletop groupings; set against backgrounds of infinite black depth with suggestions of inner light, the reimagined forms were likened to the imagery of Zurbarán (e.g., For Vandy, 2006). Over the course of the decade, Gregory's subject matter moved in the direction of everyday, domestic Americana—toys, oil cans, spools and spindles—chosen both for their geometric form and symbolic resonances, which he imbued with a sense of personhood.

In the late 1990s, Gregory made a correlation between the still life forms and the sparse structures he observed punctuating the flat plains of the American West and heartland; the insight inspired an exploration of the iconography of grain silos and barns that combined his interests in Americana and landscape and occupied him for more than two decades. The invented scenes typically depict old farmhouses, crumbling barns and abandoned sheds, nestled at the base of undulating hills or sitting in isolation against vast skies (e.g., Gibbous Moon, 2009). Critics describe them as austere, quiet compositions brimming with emptiness, loss and struggle (e.g., Mercer's Gap, 2012). Concerned with their subjects as abstract forms and iconic signifiers of bygone modernity and the human desire to explore and build, these works recall American modernists like Charles Sheeler and Charles Demuth as well as folk art. In later landscapes continuing into the 2020s, Gregory has incorporated the experience of living in the East Coast Hudson River Valley, depicting such things as autumn, winter snow, and different topographies, colors and light.

Gregory has had solo exhibitions at the Butler Institute (1996), Bolinas Museum (2003) and Fort Collins Museum of Art (2011), as well as galleries such as Nancy Hoffman (New York, 1988–present), Berggruen (San Francisco, 1985–present), and Gail Severn (Ketchum, ID, 1993–present).

== Recognition ==
Gregory's work is held in the collections of the Boise Art Museum, Bolinas Museum, Delaware Art Museum, Denver Art Museum, Evansville Museum of Arts, History and Science, San Jose Museum of Art, Tacoma Art Museum, and U.S. Embassy (Brussels), as well as corporate collections. He was an artist-in-residence at the Evansville Museum of Arts, Science and History in 2003.
