= Berggruen Museum =

Museum in Germany

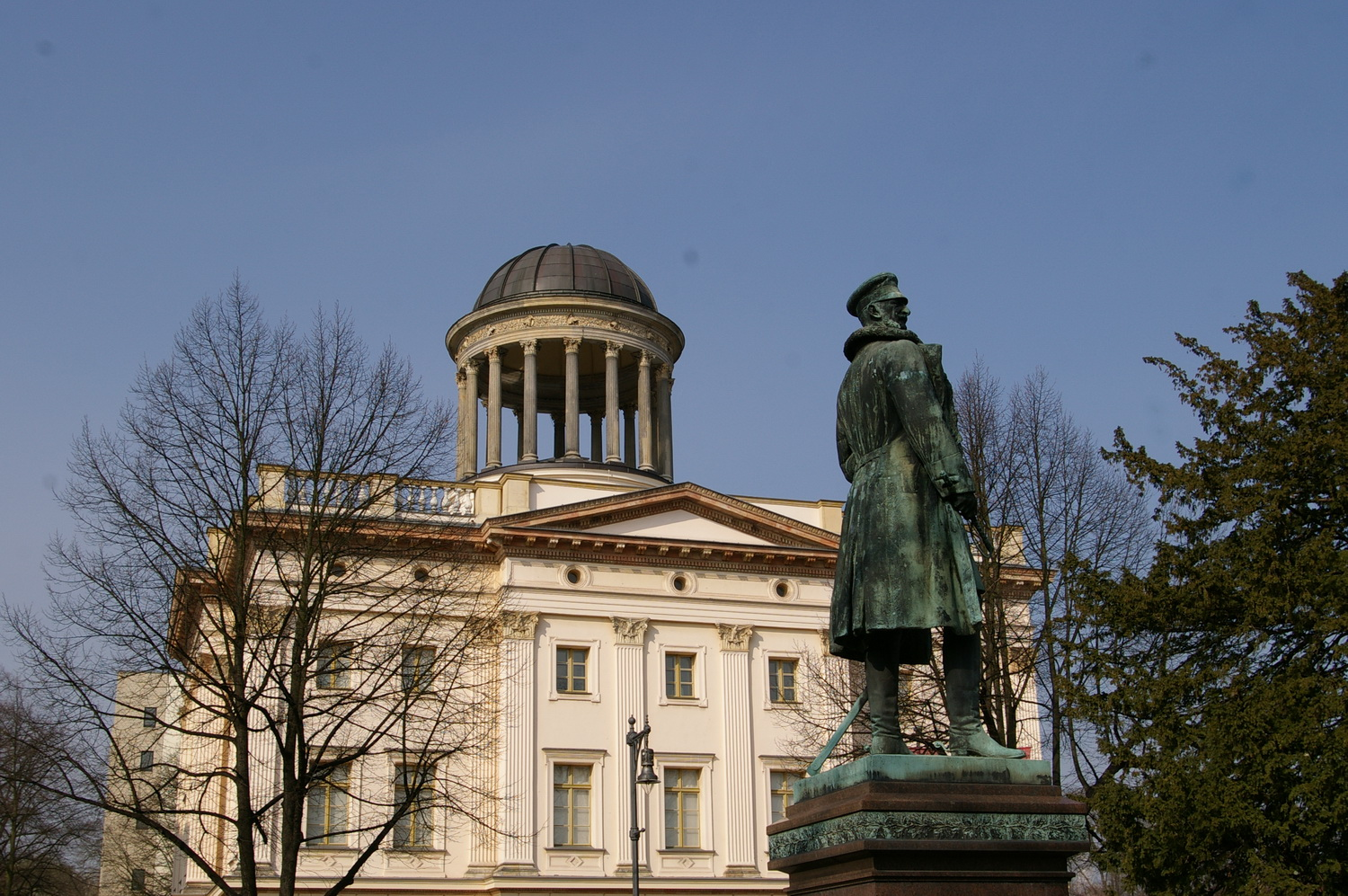
- Museum Berggruen in 2008
- Interactive fullscreen map
- Established: 1996
- Location: Berlin
- Coordinates: 52°31′09″N 13°17′43″E
- Type: Art museum
- Visitors: 80,000 (2020)
- Director: Gabriel Mantua

The Berggruen Museum (also known as the Berggruen Collection) is a collection of modern art classics in Berlin, which the collector and dealer Heinz Berggruen, in a "gesture of reconciliation", sold to his native city far below its market value. The most notable artists on display include Pablo Picasso, Alberto Giacometti, Georges Braque, Paul Klee and Henri Matisse. The Berggruen Collection is part of the National Gallery of Berlin.

== History ==
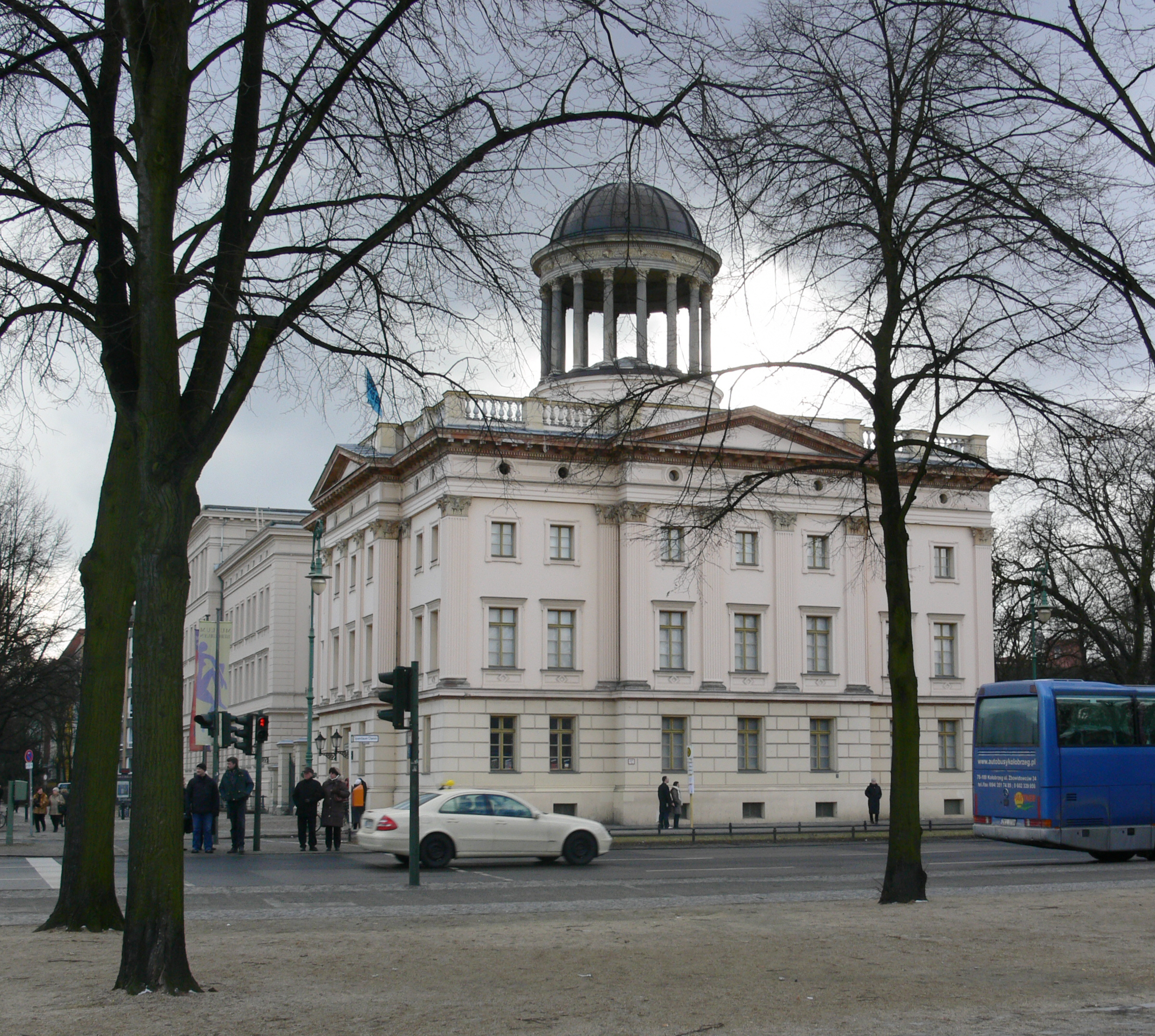
The Berggruen Museum – West Stüler Building

=== Founding ===
The collection arrived in Berlin in 1996, with Berggruen's return to his native city after six decades in exile. In 1988 he had given about 90 Klees to the Metropolitan Museum of Art, and in 1990, he had agreed to make a five-year loan (renewable by mutual agreement) to the National Gallery in London of 72 paintings and drawings by Paul Cézanne, Georges Seurat, Vincent van Gogh, Pablo Picasso, Georges Braque, and Joan Miró. Also in 1990, negotiations with Museo Nacional Centro de Arte Reina Sofía for the Berggruen collection to be shown in Madrid fell through.

Berggruen initially lent the collection, which he had assembled over 30 years, to the Prussian Cultural Heritage Foundation (SPK). He finally sold it to the SPK in December 2000, for the "symbolic" price of 253 million marks, well below its then estimated value of 1.5 billion marks. Today it is exhibited under the title "Berggruen Collection – Picasso and His Time" as part of the National Gallery of Berlin, in the West Stüler Building on Schloßstraße, opposite Charlottenburg Palace.

=== Early years ===
Berggruen continued to purchase works after the museum's opening in 1996, including Picasso's important 1909 painting Houses on the Hill (Horta de Ebro) from the Museum of Modern Art in New York City. A total of 165 works were transferred from Berggruen to the SPK in the 2000 sale.

In 2005, the Berggruen family acquired Picasso's Nu Jaune (1907) for $13.7 million at Sotheby's in New York. This gouache is one of the first studies for Les Demoiselles d'Avignon, a milestone in 20th-century art.

To mark the 10th anniversary of the museum, and his permanent retirement from public life at the age of 92, Berggruen donated a sculpture by Alberto Giacometti, Standing Woman III, to the collection in December 2006. It had in fact already been on loan at the museum until then, standing in the Stüler Building's rotunda. To keep the two-metre high bronze statue within the collection – his life's work – Berggruen quickly purchased it and donated it to the SPK. Several weeks later, on 23 February 2007, he died in Paris.

The museum received 1.5 million visitors during its first decade from 1996 to 2006. Besides the permanent exhibition "Picasso and His Time", the museum hosts numerous special exhibitions on themes of classic modern art.

=== Expansion ===
In July 2007, the heirs to Berggruen's estate announced that they would present a further 50 classic modern works to the museum, in order to continue in their father's tradition of reconciliation with Germany. Since the transfer at Christmas 2000, Berggruen had continued to purchase paintings, including works by Picasso, Matisse, Klee and Cézanne, among others. To make an expansion possible, the state of Berlin announced that it would endow the SPK with a new building for its 50th anniversary: the Kommandantenhaus, adjacent to the West Stüler Building.

A society for friends of the Berggruen Museum (Förderkreis Museum Berggruen e. V.) was founded at the same time, with members including Berggruen's widow Bettina, his children Nicolas, Olivier, John and Helen, as well as Michael Blumenthal, Michael Naumann, and Simon de Pury. The SPK agreed to take on the running costs of the society.

Plans were announced in 2008 to connect the two buildings, to be paid for by the government and installed by the state of Berlin. Chosen from an architectural competition, architects Kuehn Malvezzi designed a glass pergola which was completed in 2013.

In May 2008, a further 70 paintings were added to the collection. In 2011, the seminal Picasso painting Les Femmes d'Alger ("Version L," 1955) was acquired for the museum at auction for $21.4 million.

=== Renovations ===
Since 2022, the museum has been undergoing extensive renovations. While it is closed, parts of the collection are being exhibited at the National Museum of Western Art in Tokyo (2022), the National Museum of Art in Osaka (2022), UCCA Edge in Shanghai (2023) and Musée de l'Orangerie in Paris (2024).

== Collection ==
The centrepiece of the collection is the work of Picasso, with over 100 exhibits, together with over 60 pictures by Paul Klee. Henri Matisse is represented by over 20 works, including more than half a dozen of his famous cutouts. Sculpture ensembles by Alberto Giacometti and examples of African sculpture round out the core of the collection.

=== Collection highlights ===
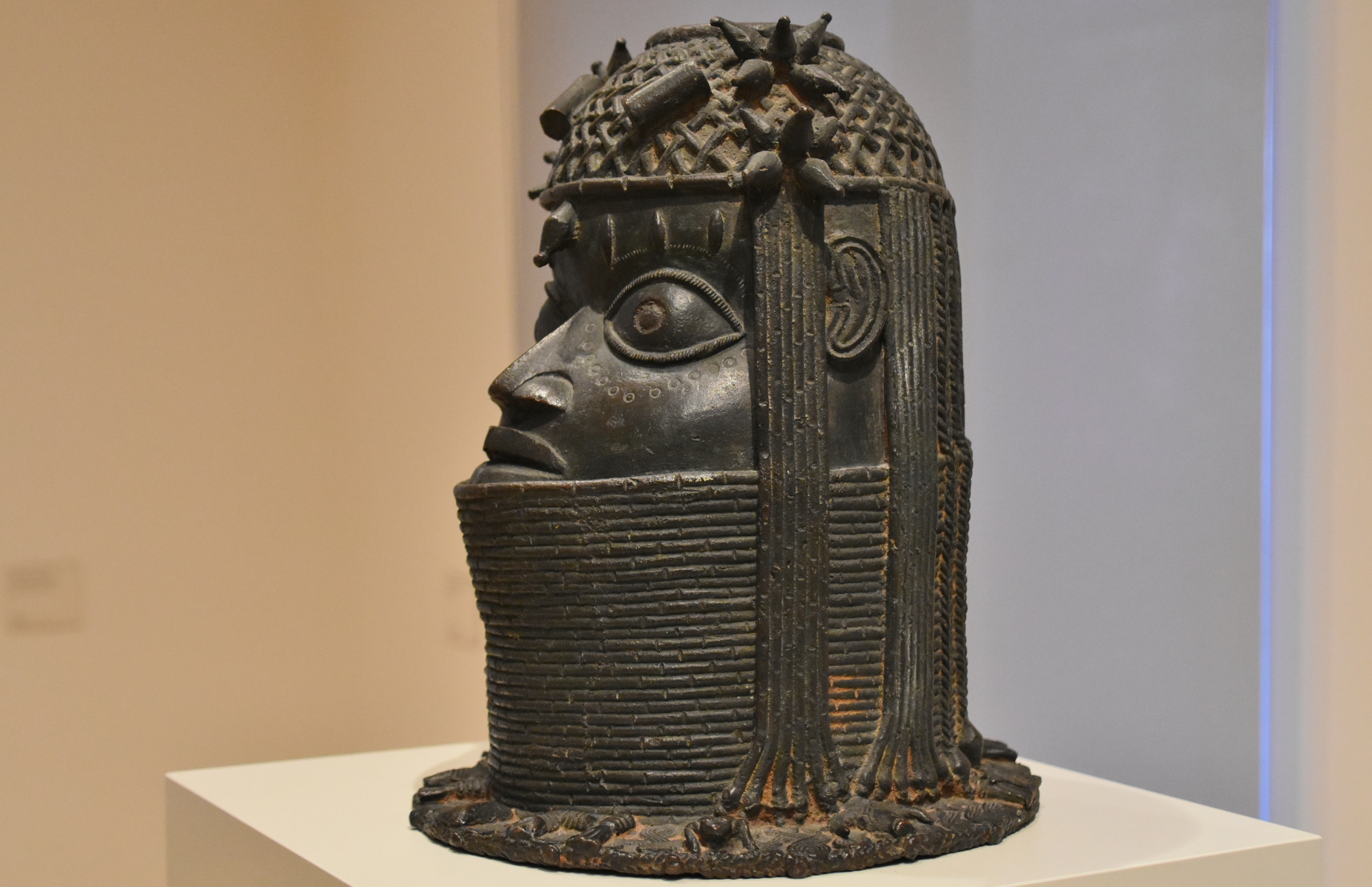
18th-century Memorial head, Benin

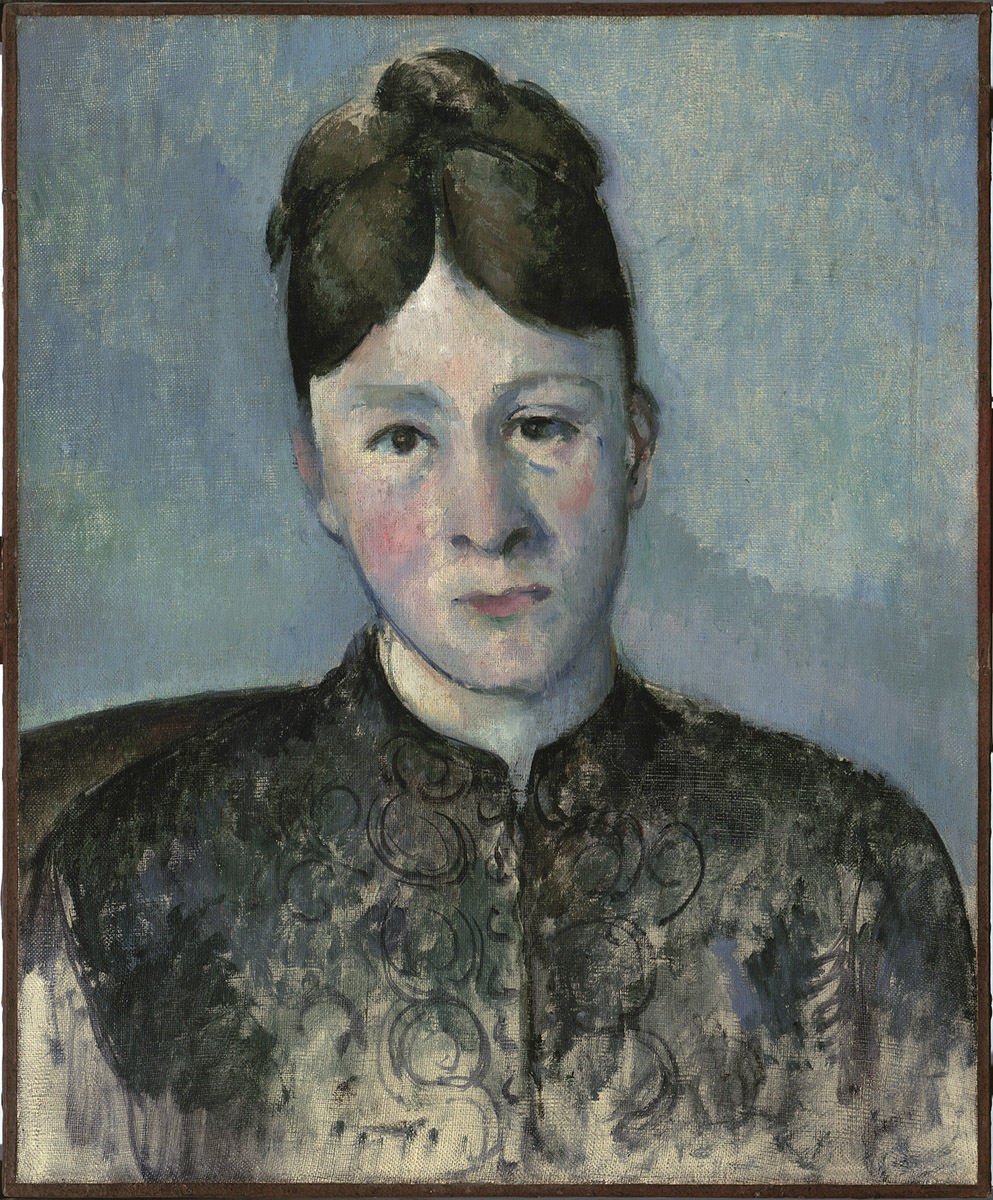
Paul Cézanne, Portrait de Madame Cézanne (1885)

Pablo Picasso, Houses on the Hill, Horta de Ebro (1909)

Picasso, Ma Jolie (1914)

Picasso, Seated Nude Drying her Foot (1921)

== Directors ==
- 2018–present: Gabriel Montua
