= Berggruen Institute =

American think tank founded in 2010

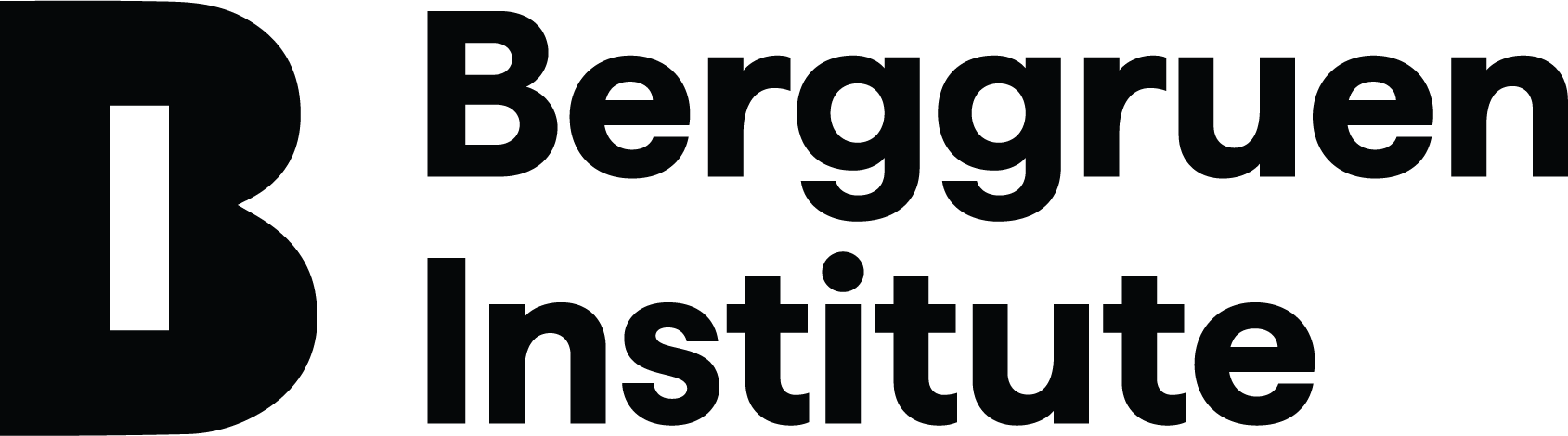
- Formation: 2010; 16 years ago
- Founders: Nicolas Berggruen; Nathan Gardels
- Tax ID no.: 46-5602320
- Registration no.: C3671781
- Location: Los Angeles, California
- Revenue: $16,635,720 (2022)
- Expenses: $18,889,571 (2022)
- Endowment: $1 billion (2024)
- Staff: 30 (2022)
- Website: berggruen.org

The Berggruen Institute is a think tank based in Los Angeles, with centers in Beijing and Venice.

== History ==
Berggruen Institute was founded in 2010 by investor-philanthropist Nicolas Berggruen and journalist Nathan Gardels to research and publish on topics related to governance, economics, geopolitics, and technology.

In 2014, the Institute established The WorldPost, an online publication in a joint initiative with HuffPost and later The Washington Post.

The Institute established its Philosophy and Culture Center in 2015, creating the annual Berggruen Prize for Philosophy & Culture and launching a fellowship program in collaboration with universities including USC, Harvard, Stanford, Oxford, and Peking University.

Berggruen has recruited numerous supporters and advisers of the Institute including Eric Schmidt, Reid Hoffman, Arianna Huffington, Evan Spiegel, Stephan Schwarzman, Ernesto Zedillo, Jack Dorsey, Elon Musk, and Patrick Soon-Shiong. The Berggruen Institute maintains cooperative relationships with the China Institute for Innovation and Development Strategy.

Since its founding, the institute has expanded globally, establishing centers in Beijing and Venice and developing initiatives in Europe, China, and the United States. In 2018, the Institute established a research center at Peking University with $25.5 million in funding. Between 2022 and 2023, the Institute acquired three historic properties in Venice to serve as its European headquarters and cultural centers.

== Councils and Committees ==
=== 21st Century Council ===
Founded in 2011, the 21st Century Council was composed of former heads of state, global business leaders, and intellectuals who convene to discuss challenges in global governance. Past members have included former British Prime Minister Gordon Brown, former Mexican President Ernesto Zedillo, and former Brazilian President Fernando Henrique Cardoso. The council has organized conferences with Chinese President Xi Jinping and senior officials to discuss trade, technology, and international cooperation.

=== Council on the Future of Europe ===
The Council on the Future of Europe is a committee focused on policy and public debate concerning European integration. In May 2013, the council held a "town hall" meeting endorsed by the French President Francois Hollande, Spanish Prime Minister Mariano Rajoy, and Italian labor minister. The council, along with Germany's labor minister, Ursula von der Leyen, proposed an investment, training, and jobs program for Europe. The program eventually became a part of European policy in January 2015 when European Commission President Jean-Claude Juncker proposed the 315 billion euro Investment Plan.

=== The Think Long Committee for California ===
The Think Long Committee for California is a bipartisan group that develops methods for improving governance in California. In November 2011, the Committee published its report, A Blueprint to Renew California. In 2014, the committee supported SB 1253, "The Ballot Initiative Transparency Act", which was approved on September 28, 2014. The committee also supported Proposition 2 in 2014, which established a "Rainy Day Fund" to allocate a percentage of annual revenue toward state debt and to safeguard against economic downturns.

== Notable Programs ==
=== Berggruen Prize for Philosophy and Culture ===
The Berggruen Prize for Philosophy and Culture is an annual award established in 2016 by the Berggruen Institute. It awards US$1 million to thinkers whose ideas have shaped human self-understanding and advancement. An independent jury selects the laureates each year.

Recipients include philosopher Charles Taylor for modern identity; Onora O'Neill for ethics and international justice; Martha C. Nussbaum for emotion in moral and political philosophy; Ruth Bader Ginsburg for gender equality in law; Paul Farmer for public health and human rights; Peter Singer for effective altruism; Kojin Karatani for interdisciplinary scholarship, and Patricia Hill Collins for intersectionality and social justice.

=== Berggruen Prize Essay Competition ===
In 2024, the Berggruen Institute established the Berggruen Prize Essay Competition as an annual contest to complement its Philosophy & Culture Prize. The contest accepts essays in both English and Chinese, with a prize of US$50,000 awarded to the winner in each language category.

=== Studio B ===
Studio B, is the production division of the Berggruen Institute. It is directed by Alex Gardels and Nathalia Ramos An, along with Nick Goddard who serves as producer and head of development. The Studio produces content focused on the intersection of technology, philosophy, and culture. Its projects include a salon series featuring conversations between Eric Schmidt and Ashton Kutcher, and Yuval Noah Harari and Joseph Gordon-Levitt.

Studio B also works with the Academy Museum of Motion Pictures on programming related to changes in cinema and produces the Berggruen Institute's podcast, Futurology.

In June 2024, the studio hosted a private discussion on artificial intelligence in filmmaking with Ashton Kutcher and Eric Schmidt. The event drew backlash after Kutcher praised OpenAI's video-generation tool, Sora, suggesting it could replace traditional film crews and stunt performers. Critics condemned the remarks as undermining creative labor, which sparked a wider controversy regarding the promotion of AI in Hollywood.

== Publications ==
=== Noema Magazine ===
Noema Magazine was originally founded as The WorldPost in 2014 as a joint initiative with HuffPost. In 2017, The Washington Post began publishing The WorldPost's content, featuring global perspectives through op-eds, features, and videos.

In 2020, The WorldPost was renamed Noema Magazine and launched a print edition in addition to its digital content. Noema covers a range of subjects, including philosophy, governance, geopolitics, economics, technology, and culture. As of 2025, Nathan Gardels serves as its editor-in-chief.

== Campuses ==
=== China Center ===
The Berggruen China Center is an interdisciplinary academic research institute at Peking University. Berggruen China Center was founded on December 19, 2018, as the Berggruen Research Center, following a joint initiative between the Berggruen Institute and Peking University, in which the Berggruen Institute provided $25.5 million in funding in June 2018. It runs a fellowship program and hosts symposia and conferences.

=== Casa dei Tre Oci ===
Casa dei Tre Oci is a neo-gothic building constructed in 1913 on the island of Giudecca in Venice, acquired by the Berggruen Institute in 2021 to serve as its European headquarters.

=== Scholars' Campus ===
Scholars' Campus, also known as Monteverdi, is a planned 447-acre headquarters and residential research center for the Berggruen Institute, located west of the I-405 freeway and northeast of the Getty Center in the eastern Santa Monica Mountains. Berggruen acquired the land in 2014 for $45 million.

It is designed by architects Herzog & de Meuron, with Gensler serving as executive architect.
