= Deaths in December 1978 =

The following is a list of notable deaths in December 1978. Entries for each day are listed alphabetically by surname. A typical entry lists information in the following sequence:

- Name, age, country of citizenship at birth, subsequent country of citizenship (if applicable), reason for notability, cause of death (if known), and reference.

== December 1978 ==
=== 1 ===
- David Nixon, 58, English magician and television personality, he presented series such as the British version of Candid Camera and Comedy Bandbox (1962), he was also the first partner to the fictional character Basil Brush,he funded the development and manufacture of the Mellotron, an electro-mechanical musical instrument, and the company Mellotronics, he appeared in a 1965 Pathé News newsreel feature to demonstrate the instrument, death due to lung cancer.

=== 3 ===
- William Grant Still, 83, American composer,for the 1939 New York World's Fair, Still composed Song of a City for the exhibit "Democracity," which played continuously during the fair's run, despite writing music for the fair, he was unable to attend the fair without police protection except on "Negro Day".

=== 4 ===
- Tancred Ibsen, 85, Norwegian military officer, aviator, film director, and screenwriter,he started his film career in 1920s Los Angeles, as a screenwriter for the studio Metro-Goldwyn-Mayer,he directed Norway's first feature-length sound film, Den store barnedåpen (1931), and he was a dominant figure of the country's film industry throughout the 1930s,his fims tended to be conventional melodramas, following the style of Classical Hollywood cinema.
- Brian Lewis, 49, British science fiction illustrator, comics artist, and animator,in the late 1960s and 1970s, he drew comics adaptations of television properties for TV21, Countdown, and TV Action,he illustrated horror adaptations for Dez Skinn's House of Hammer (including most covers for that series), as well as illustrating a number of episodes of the ongoing feature Van Helsing's Terror Tales,; this latter work led to commissions for Warren Publishing's Vampirella in the United States.
- Goodie Reeve, 80-81 (date of birth uncertain), British-born Australian actress, singer, songwriter, radio host, and columnist,she was a highly popular radio host during the 1930s, but her popularity had its drawbacks, including death threats to her person and having Christmas cakes sent to her, which contained screws, needles and other harmful objects,after World War II, Reeve ran the popular 2GB programme Session for the Blind, that included a backing band of blind musicians

=== 6 ===
- Dick Dreux, 65, Dutch writer of historical literature and comics artist,his non-fiction historical works included De Grote Leugen (The Big Lie) (1966), in which he exposed militarism and the hidden agenda of the ruling class,he also wrote serial stories for children's magazines like Donald Duck Weekblad, starting in the 1950s,; a number of his stories were illustrated by Hans Kresse and published as comic books, Dreux's writing style was accessible and conversational, for which he credited his grandfather, a "born storyteller".

=== 7 ===
- I. Stanford Jolley, 78, American actor and vaudevillian,he started his film career with a small role in the serial film Dick Tracy (1937) and subsequently appeared in over 400 films and television productions, death due to arteriosclerotic heart disease and heart failure
- Alexander Wetmore, 92, American ornithologist and avian paleontologist, between 1946 and 1966, Wetmore made annual trips to Panama to study and collect specimens of the birds of the Isthmus of Panama, his 4-volume magnum opus, Birds of the Republic of Panama, was published by the Smithsonian Institution from 1965 untl 1984, with the last volume appearing posthumously.

=== 8 ===
- Golda Meir, 80, Ukrainian-born Israeli politician from Kiev,she served as the prime minister of Israel from 1969 until 1974, she maintained the national unity government formed in 1967 after the Six-Day War, in which the Labor Zionist party Mapai merged with two other parties (Rafi and Ahdut HaAvoda) to form the then-new Israeli Labor Party,six months after taking office, Meir led the reconfigured Alignment, comprising the Labor Party and Mapam, into the 1969 general election, and the Alignment managed what is still the best showing for a single party or faction in Israeli history, winning 56 seats,; this is the only time that a party or faction has approached winning an outright majority in an election, she resigned from office and retired from politics following the Yom Kippur War (1973), as her government was plagued by infighting and questions over Israel's lack of preparation for the war,death due to lymphatic cancer (lymphoma).

=== 10 ===
- Emilio Portes Gil, 88, Mexican politician, diplomat, and lawyer, he served as the president of Mexico from 1928 until 1930, he was appointed as the interim president by Congress, after the assassination of the winner of the 1928 general election, the president-elect Álvaro Obregón, Portes Gil inherited a widespread religious rebellion, the Cristero War (1926–1929), which his predecessor Plutarco Elías Calles had provoked by aggressively enforcing anticlerical laws, as president, Portes Gil secretly negotiated the end to the conflict between the Catholic Church and the Mexican government, which created a modus vivendi that lasted for decades,death due to a heart attack.
- Fausto Tozzi, 57, Italian actor and screenwriter, he wrote the script for the drama film The Defeated Victor (1958), which was entered into the 9th Berlin International Film Festival, death caused by respiratory failure.
- Ed Wood, 54, American filmmaker, actor and novelist, he has a posthumous reputation of being creative in working with the financial and cinematic limitations which he faced throughout his career,.his best known film is the science fiction horror film Plan 9 from Outer Space (1957), which found a cult following in 1980 when Michael Medved declared this film to be "the worst film ever made" in his book The Golden Turkey Awards, death due to a heart attack. Several minutes before his death, Wood had told his wife that he had breathing problems. She and her friends ignored his call for help, as they were watching a football game on television.

=== 11 ===
- Vincent du Vigneaud, 77, American biochemist,he received the 1955 Nobel Prize in Chemistry "for his work on biochemically important sulphur compounds, especially for the first synthesis of a polypeptide hormone," a reference to his work on the peptide hormone oxytocin.

=== 12 ===
- Bill Bailey, 66, American tap dancer,for much of his career, the "backslide" (later known as the "Moonwalk") was his signature exit, its first recording was in a 1943 musical film, Bailey retired from show business in 1946, following struggles with drug addiction,; he subsequently studied religion and opened his own church in Harlem.
- Fay Compton, 84, English actress,among her last major roles were Aunt Ann in the BBC's 1967 television adaptation of The Forsyte Saga, and Mrs Brown the old rag dealer in a BBC adaptation of Charles Dickens' Dombey and Son in 1969.

=== 14 ===
- Salvador de Madariaga, 92, Spanish diplomat, writer, historian, and pacifist,chairing the Council of the League of Nations in January 1932, he condemned Japan's aggression in Manchuria in such vehement terms that he was nicknamed "Don Quijote de la Manchuria",he went into exile in England in 1936, in order to escape the Spanish Civil War; while in England, he became a vocal opponent of and organised resistance to the Nationalists and to Francisco Franco's Spanish State.in 1947, he was one of the principal authors of the Oxford Manifesto on liberalism, he participated in the Hague Congress (1948) as president of the Cultural Commission and he was one of the co-founders in 1949 of the College of Europe.

=== 15 ===
- Edgar Lustgarten, 71, British crime writer, barrister, and broadcaster, he is remembered for hosting the film series Scotland Yard (1953–1961) and The Scales of Justice (1962–1967), a parody version of Lustgarten appears as the Narrator in the musical comedy film The Rocky Horror Picture Show (1975).
- Chill Wills, 76, American actor and singer, he was nominated for the Academy Award for Best Supporting Actor for his role as Beekeeper in the war film The Alamo (1960),he served as the master of ceremonies for the California campaign stops of the George Wallace 1968 presidential campaign,death due to cancer.

=== 16 ===
- Blanche Calloway, 76, American jazz singer, composer, and bandleader, she was the first woman to lead an all-male orchestra,around 1968, she formed Afram House, a mail-order cosmetics company for African Americans,death due to breast cancer.

=== 17 ===
- Irving Jacobson, 80, American actor of the Yiddish theater,he and his brother Hymie Jacobson owned several Yiddish theaters, including the National Theater and the Second Avenue Theater, in the Yiddish Theater District of New York City.

=== 21 ===
- Shūji Sano, 66, Japanese actor,he was a popular star of the Shōchiku film studios, he is best known for his appearances in the films of Yasujirō Ozu, Keisuke Kinoshita, Heinosuke Gosho and Hiroshi Shimizu.

=== 23 ===
- Louis de Rochemont, 79, American filmmaker,he was a co-creator and producer of the American newsreel series The March of Time,in March 1951, de Rochemont's production company purchased the animated film rights to George Orwell's dystopian novella Animal Farm (1945), and de Rochemont was heavily involved in the artistic direction of an animated adaptation released in 1954.

=== 27 ===
- Houari Boumédiène, 46, Algerian military officer, revolutionary, and politician, he served as the head of state of Algeria from 1965 until his death in office in 1978,; under his leadership, Algeria participated in the 1973 oil embargo,death attributed to the effects of Waldenström macroglobulinemia. A crowd of two million mourners attended his state funeral.
- Jean Inness, 78. American actress, she portrayed the nurse Beatrice Fain in the American medical drama television series Dr. Kildare.

=== 28 ===
- Vera Altayskaya, 59, Soviet actress,for most of her career, she was typecast in portraying shrewish or matronly characters.
- Władysław Nehrebecki, 55, Polish animator and animation director,he created the character duo of Bolek and Lolek.

=== 31 ===
- Nicolau Lobato, 32, East Timorese politician, he briefly served as the first Prime Minister of Timor-Leste in 1975, and as the President of Timor-Leste from 1975 until his death in office in 1978, he was ambushed at Mount Mindelo and fatally shot in the stomach by the Kopassus, an Indonesian special forces unit.
- Basil Wolverton, 69, American cartoonist and illustrator,Wolverton's humor feature Powerhouse Pepper, about a superstrong if none-too-bright boxer, appeared in various comic books published by Timely Comics, the 1930s and 1940s precursor of Marvel Comics, from 1942 through 1952,in 1946, Wolverton won a contest to depict "Lena the Hyena", the world's ugliest woman, a running gag in Al Capp's Li'l Abner newspaper strip where Lena remained unseen beneath an editorial note stating her face had been covered to protect readers,Wolverton's Lena portrait typified the unique "spaghetti-and-meatballs school of design" style which he employed regularly thereafter.

== Sources ==
- Ford, Luke (1999). A History of X: 100 Years of Sex in Film. Prometheus Books. ISBN 1-61592-631-3.
- Parker, John; et al., eds. (1978). Who Was Who in the Theatre. Detroit: Gale. OCLC 310466453.
