= Shifra Lerer =

Argentine-born American Yiddish theater actress (born 1911)

- Lerer in 1953
- Born: August 30, 1915; Argentina
- Died: March 12, 2011 (aged 95); New York City, New York, U.S.
- Occupation: Actress
- Movement: Yiddish theatre
- Spouses: Ben-Zion Witler (m. 1956; died 1961): Michael Michalovic

Shifra Lerer (August 30, 1915 – March 12, 2011) was an Argentine-born American Yiddish theater actress based in New York City. Lerer appeared opposite every major Yiddish theater actor during her career, which lasted 90 years. She was also cast in film roles, including the 1997 Woody Allen film Deconstructing Harry.

== Early life ==
Lerer was born in the Santa Catalina colony in Argentina on August 30, 1915. Her father, a manager at a soap factory, had immigrated to Argentina from the Russian Empire to escape anti-Semitism and poverty through the sponsorship of philanthropist and banker Maurice de Hirsch. Lerer was discovered in Buenos Aires by Yiddish theater legend, producer and actor Boris Thomashefsky, who was starring in the area, when she was just five or eight years old, at the recommendation of her sister (the actress Miryam Lerer). At ten, she was participating in Yakov Botashanski's productions in a theater circle. When she was older, she studied at a Spanish-language drama school and performed for three years on the Argentinian stage. She then passed the examinations for the actors' union and became a member, playing with the star Miryam Karalova-Kambarov, then Moyshe Oysher and Florence Weiss, and finally in serious drama roles with Zygmunt Turkow in Urteyl, Hirsh Lekert, Ivan Kruger and Di glokn-tsier fun Notr-dam (The Bell-ringer (Hunchback) of Notre Dame).

== Career ==
Lerer played with Yakov Ben-Ami and Bertha Kalich in Friedrich Wolf's Profesor Mamlok, Strindberg's Der Foter, and H. Leivick's Der poet is blind gevorn (The poet became blind); with Samuel (Hymie) Goldenberg in Kalmanovich's Hayntike kinder (Kids these days); and with Maurice Schwartz in Singer's Moyshe Kalb.

In 1943 she was invited by Samuel Goldberg to perform at the Parkway Theater in Brooklyn (owned by Hymie Jacobson and his brother Irving). Her first performance was in Fun Niu York keyn Berlin; she then toured concertizing at places like the Arbeter Ring, the National Yiddish Workers Union, and Camp Boyberik. In 1946 she went back to Argentina where she worked with Ben-Zion Witler at the Mitre theater and thereafter toured and performed with him; they married in 1957. Witler died from a brain tumor in 1961.

Lerer joined the actors' union in 1949 and played in Got, mentsh un tayvl with Mikhal Mikhalesko and Gustav Berger. In 1952, she participated in Herman Yablokoff's production of Benyomin Ressler's Onkl Sem in yisroel (Uncle Sam in Israel) in the Public Theater in New York.

== Personal life ==
Lerer ultimately decided to settle permanently in New York City. She worked actively in the Yiddish theater circuit until she was 90 years old. Her second husband was the Yiddish actor Michael Michalovic, who died in 1987. She was best friends with the late Yiddish theater actress Mina Bern, who died in 2010.

Shifra Lerer died of a stroke in Manhattan on March 12, 2011, at the age of 95. She was buried in Block 67 of Mount Hebron Cemetery in Flushing, Queens, next to her second husband Michael Michalovic. The cemetery's Block 67 is reserved for who worked in New York City's Yiddish theater industry. Lerer was buried just rows from Boris Thomashefsky, who discovered Lerer at the age of 5 in Argentina.

== Filmography ==
=== Film ===
Year	Title	Role	Notes
1950	God, Man and Devil	Freda	
1990	Avalon	Nellie Krichinsky	
1992	A Stranger Among Us	Yiddish Woman #1	
1996	Breathing Room	Kathy's Grandmother	
1997	Deconstructing Harry	Dolly	
2000	The Komediant	—N/a	Documentary
2005	Yiddish Theater: A Love Story	—N/a	Documentary
