= Irving Jacobson =

American actor (1898–1978)

Irving Jacobson (June 18, 1898 – December 17, 1978) was a Yiddish theater star, American stage and film actor. Born in Cincinnati, Ohio, to actors Joseph and Bessie Jacobson, his brother was Hymie Jacobson and his sister Henrietta Jacobson, who married Julius Adler. Irving played juvenile roles in Pinkhas Thomashefsky's troupe and later appeared in films by Sidney Goldin. He performed two years with Goldenburg at Philadelphia's Garden Theater and toured Paris and Romania with May Shoenfeld in 1929. He and his brother Hy Jacobson co-wrote the novelty number A Bisl Fefer, A Bisl Zalts (A little pepper, a little salt), recorded by Pesach Burstein. As the comic character Schnitz'l Putz'l (Scheptzl Schnitzlputzl) he recorded the songs Az men muz, muz men (Az Men Muzsh Muzsh Men) (If you gotta, you gotta) and Zets in Gis Kalet Vaser with Abraham Ellstein's Orchestra. He starred in William Siegel's comedy Don't Worry with Leo Fuchs and Miriam Kressyn.

He left vaudeville to become a well known comic actor on the Yiddish stage. He and his brother Hy owned several Yiddish theaters, including the National Theater and the Second Avenue Theater, in the Yiddish Theater District in New York City. He was star of the Josef Seiden's Yiddish language movie The Great Advisor (1940) with Yetta Zwerling, Mae Schoenfeld, Lazar Freed, and others. Performing in English on Broadway, Jacobson played Sancho Panza in the original Broadway run of Man Of La Mancha. He was the uncle of Bruce Adler and shares a star on the "Yiddish Walk of Fame" on Second Avenue with his brother. He's buried in Mount Hebron Cemetery in Queens, NY.

== Filmography ==
- Eli, Eli (Yiddish) (1940)
- The Great Advisor (Yiddish) (1940)
- The Art of Love (1965)
