= Komediant =

Komediant means comedian in several Germanic languages, including German and Yiddish.

Komediant may also refer to:

- Komediant (film): a 1984 Czech movie directed by Otakar Vávra
- The Komediant (show): a Yiddish theater act produced by Pesach Burstein and his troupe
- The Komediant (documentary): a 2000 Israeli documentary in Yiddish and English directed by Arnon Goldfinger on the life and careers of Pesach Burstein and his family
