= Lillian Lux =

American singer-songwriter (1918–2005)

- Born: Lillian Sylvia Lukashefsky; June 20, 1918; Brooklyn, New York City, New York, United States
- Died: June 11, 2005 (aged 86); New York, New York, United States
- Spouse(s): Pesach Burstein (1938–1986) (his death) 2 children

Lillian Lux (June 20, 1918 – June 11, 2005) was an American singer, author, songwriter and actress in Yiddish theater and Yiddish vaudeville in the United States, Israel, and other Yiddish speaking communities in the diaspora.

== Biography ==
Lillian Sylvia Lukashefsky (later Lux) was born in Brooklyn. Her father, was a jeweler, and a descendant of Nachman of Breslov. He had originally wanted to become an actor. He sent his daughter to the Yiddish Art Theater, where Lux began performing when she was just seven years old. By the age of 14, Lux was a chorus girl and involved in various Yiddish radio programs. Working in the Catskills, she was teamed with a young Danny Kaye; the friendship that began from the working relationship was lifelong.

She met her future husband, Polish-born Israeli Yiddish-language actor-director Pesach Burstein, in 1938 when he hired her for his theater company's South American tour. While on the tour, the couple was married in Montevideo, Uruguay. In 1962, the family moved to Israel.

== Theatre career ==
Lux's most notable roles in her milieu were The Komediant and A Khasene in Shtetl (A Wedding in the Village), both of which were directed by her husband. Her most critically acclaimed performance was in Itzik Manger's Songs of the Megillah (Yiddish: Megille Lider - the longest running Yiddish production to date in Israel, released on Broadway as Megilla of Itzik Manger). It was Lux's only role on Broadway.

She played roles alongside her husband, and often alongside her twin children Mike and Susan, who were born in 1945; the performing family was advertised as the Four Bursteins. On the 100th anniversary of her husband's birth in 1996, director Arnon Goldfinger directed a documentary film about the lives and careers of the Burstein family -The Komediant.

The move to serious theater (notably Megilla of Itzak Menger) was partly orchestrated by Lux. She also ran a cosmetics company - Lily of Israel. She wrote songs and musicals and appeared in Israeli and American films and television dramas, among them The Body and Law and Order.

Her son, Mike Burstyn is an actor on Broadway, in Israeli theatre and the Yiddish theater. Her daughter, Susan, has not performed on stage since her teenage years.

Lux co-authored her husband's Yiddish autobiography Geshpilt a Lebn (1980), which was later translated into English.

== Death and commemoration ==
Lux and her husband are buried in the Yiddish Theatrical Alliance section—Block 67—of Mount Hebron Cemetery. This section is reserved for those who worked in New York Yiddish theater; the section is maintained by the Alliance.
