= A Khasene in Shtetl =

Yiddish musical theater play (1930)

A Khasene in Shtetl (Yiddish for A Wedding in the Village / A Village Wedding, also called A Shtetl Wedding / A Wedding in the Shtetl; Yiddish: אַ חתונה אין שטעטל) is a Yiddish musical theater play written by William Siegel (or: Segal), with music by Herman Wohl, which was first performed at the National Theater on Second Avenue and Houston Street, in New York City, in September 1930, starring Aaron Lebedeff.

Later, Pesach Burstein, a Jewish Polish-American performer in the Yiddish theater, became well known for directing and acting in the play. Burstein's troupe, and most notably his immediate family – his wife Lillian Lux, and later also his son Mike Burstyn and daughter Susan Burstein (all part of the advertised Four Bursteins) – went around the globe giving theater performances for audiences of the Yiddish-speaking diaspora. While panned by critics, the play was able to engage a vast variety of audiences, in locales as diverse as (pre-Holocaust) Eastern Europe, Israel, Latin America and the United States.

The play was one of several Old World counterparts to Al Jolson's The Jazz Singer. The play depicts the trials of a rabbi's son going on stage. Pesach Burstein was well acquainted with Al Jolson, as he had signed up for a contract with Columbia Records sometime before. The play was probably also based on some autobiographical elements, as Burstein ran away from his Polish family to join a mobile Yiddish theater group.

Extensive footage of the play, and information regarding it, are presented in the 2000 documentary about the Burstein family, The Komediant.
