= Odessa Mama (song) =

Single by Russisch-Jüdische Orchester
- Language: Yiddish
- B-side: "Diere Geld"
- Released: 1921
- Recorded: September 1910
- Genre: Klezmer
- Label: Columbia

Odessa Mama (also Odessa Mame, Odesa Mame, Adesa Mame; Yiddish: אָדעסאַ מאַמע) is a Yiddish song of Russian origin, which enjoyed popularity in numerous East European countries, as well as the United States before the Holocaust. It has been recorded by notable performers like Pesach Burstein, Aaron Lebedeff and Herman Yablakoff. There are Ukrainian language and Russian language versions of the song as well. The song is about the love for the city of Odesa, looked upon as a mother by locals and is an ode to Odesa's sidewalks, electric lights, hotels, and other modern amenities. Odessa Mama is a term used by people of Odesa to refer to their city. The song was thus popular with immigrants, in a similar vein to the Yiddish American showtune Romania, Romania.

One of the most enduring and popular versions of the song was recorded by the Yiddish entertainer and singer Aaron Lebedeff in the 1940s, with the orchestra conducted by Shalom Secunda.

The song also exists in Russian lyrics under the name Одесса мама sung by Leonid Utyosov.
