= Bruce Adler =

American actor (1944–2008)

- Adler in the production of Golden Land
- Born: November 27, 1944; New York City, U.S.
- Died: July 25, 2008 (aged 63); Davie, Florida, U.S.
- Occupation: Actor
- Years active: 1979–2008
- Spouses: Isabelle "Izzy" Farrell (m. 1983; div. 2002) Amy London (m. 2003)

Bruce Adler (November 27, 1944 – July 25, 2008) was an American Broadway actor. After debuting on the Broadway stage in the 1979 revival of Oklahoma!, he went on to a career that saw him nominated for Tony Awards as Best Featured Actor in a Musical for Those Were the Days (1991) and Crazy For You (1992). His film work was limited to voice work in animated films, notably providing the singing voice for the peddler of the 1992 Disney film Aladdin and the 1996 sequel Aladdin and the King of Thieves.

== Early life ==
Born in New York City, Adler's parents, Henrietta Jacobson and Julius Adler, and his two maternal uncles, Irving and Hymie Jacobson were well-established popular stars of the Yiddish theatre, at the time in its heyday on New York's Lower East Side. Adler made his stage debut at an early age, appearing with his parents. The three Adlers played the London Palladium with Sophie Tucker in the 1950s. He continued to appear in Yiddish theatre throughout his teens, also appearing in mainstream American theatre as his parents made a similar "crossover," most notably appearing in productions of Neil Simon's Come Blow Your Horn.

== Career ==
Adler served in the United States Army from 1966 through 1968. He continued his career thereafter, firmly straddling the two worlds of Yiddish and American Theatre. After much success in regional theatre, Adler made his Broadway debut as Ali Hakim, the Peddler, in the 35th anniversary production of Oklahoma! in 1979. He was following in the footsteps of actor Joseph Buloff, who had created the role in 1943, and also had a huge background on the Yiddish stage. Other Broadway shows included Oh, Brother! (1981), Sunday in the Park with George (1984 & 1994), Broadway (1987), Rumors (1988), Those Were The Days (1991), where he won the Drama Desk Award, and Crazy for You (1992). Adler stayed with Crazy for You for the entirety of its four-year run on Broadway.

Off-Broadway, Adler appeared in several well-received Yiddish speaking and Jewish-themed productions of the last 30 years, including The Golden Land (1985), On Second Avenue (1987),The Rise of David Levinsky (1987) and many others. He appeared in many summer productions at The Muny Theater in St. Louis. He had a voice role in Disney's animated film, Beauty and the Beast, Peddler in Disney's Aladdin, as well as roles in television shows such as Law & Order.

Adler created a second career for himself starting in the mid-1990s, with a series of shows which played to huge success in the legitimate theatres of South Florida from the Palm Beaches to Ft. Lauderdale to Miami. His shows paid tribute to the performers who had shaped his own style including Danny Kaye, Sammy Davis Jr., Red Buttons, Cab Calloway and Jimmy Durante, among others.

In a review of Adler's one-man show Song and Dance Man, The New York Times critic Richard F. Shepard wrote, "What is there that this man can't do? He kazotskys, he soft shoes, he fandangos...He makes the oldest jokes fresh and funny!...It is impossible to watch him without being seized by his infectious spirit, his complete enjoyment in what he is doing...he brings performing brilliance to the stage!"

== Personal life and death ==
Adler's first marriage ended in divorce in 2002. He married director/actress Amy London in 2003. In February 2007, he and London had their first child together, Jacob Hayden Adler.

Bruce Adler died of liver cancer at age 63 on July 25, 2008. His last public appearance was in May 2008 at Carnegie Hall, where he recreated several numbers that evening in a gala celebration for the New York Festival of Song.

== Filmography ==
=== Film ===
Year	Title	Role	Notes
1991	Beauty and the Beast	1st Villager	Voice
1992	Aladdin	Peddler (singing voice)	Voice
1996	Aladdin and the King of Thieves	Peddler	Direct-to-video; Voice

=== Television ===
Year	Title	Role	Notes
1994	Law & Order	Art Diamond	1 episode
1999	Great Performances	Bela Zangler	1 episode

== Theatre ==
Year	Title	Role	Venue	Ref.
1974	Fiddler On The Roof	Motel	Regional, Jones Beach Theatre	
1979	Oklahoma!	Ali Hakim	Broadway, Palace Theatre	
1981	Oh, Brother!	Balthazar	Broadway, ANTA Washington Square Theatre	
1987	Broadway	Benny	Broadway, Royale Theatre	
1990	Those Were the Days	Performer	Broadway, Edison Theatre	
1992	Crazy for You	Bela Zangler	Broadway, Shubert Theatre	
1994	Sunday in the Park with George	Dennis, Franz	Broadway, St. James Theatre	

== Awards and nominations ==
Award	Year	Category	Work	Result	Ref.
1991	Tony Awards	Tony Award for Best Featured Actor in a Musical	Those Were the Days	Nominated	
1991	Drama Desk Awards	Outstanding Featured Actor in a Musical	Those Were the Days	Won	
1992	Tony Awards	Tony Award for Best Featured Actor in a Musical	Crazy for You	Nominated	
1992	Drama Desk Awards	Outstanding Featured Actor in a Musical	Crazy for You	Nominated	
