= The Jester (1937 film) =

Der Purimspiler The Jester
- Directed by: Joseph Green; Jan Nowina-Przybylski
- Written by: Joseph Green; Chaver-Paver
- Starring: Miriam Kressyn; Hymie Jacobson; Zygmunt Turkow
- Release date: 1937
- Running time: 90 minutes
- Countries: Poland; United States
- Language: Yiddish

Der Purimspiler (English: The Jester,Yiddish: דער פורים שפּילער) is a 1937 Polish black-and-white Yiddish musical comedy film directed by Joseph Green and Jan Nowina-Przybylski, with music by Nicholas Brodszky.

== Plot ==
The film is set in a Galician shtetl before World War I, rich with itinerant performers and star-crossed lovers.

Getzel, an itinerant Purimspiler (Jester) arrives in a town seeking work. He eventually finds a job in the shoemakers shop of Reb Nachum, where he meets Esther, the daughter of the house. He falls in love with her, but lacks courage to tell her.

When the circus arrives in town, Esther's head in turned by Dick, a sophisticated smooth-talking performer with the circus, leaving Getzel even more despondent.

Esther's father inherits a large sum of money; he abandons his shoe-making trade, puts on airs, and tries to marry her to Yossel, the son of a prominent family. But she won't have it.

Nachum orders a Purimspiel (Purim play) at his house, with its parade of costumes, buffoonery, and music. But Getzel, who plays the King, tells the family the truth of how money has spoiled Reb Nachum, and is ordered to leave the house. He leaves, but Esther insists on coming with him. They travel to Warsaw, but no work is forthcoming for Getzel. They meet Dick again and he persuades Esther to join him on the stage. Their act is successful and they seem set for matrimony. Even more despondent, Getzel trudges back to his 'home' town, but he cannot bring himself to tell Reb Nachum Esther's 'fate'. Even the town Rabbi cannot persuade him.

But Esther and Dick, now respectably married, follow him and reveal the truth. Reb Nuchem accepts the happenings philosophically, saying ‘After all, I still have a clown in the family!’ Amidst the rejoicings, Getzel slips quietly away to resume his travels.

== Cast ==
- Miriam Kressyn as Esther
- Zygmunt Turkow as Getzel
- Hymie Jacobson as Dick
- Ajzyk Samberg as Reb Nachum
- Max Bozyk as Reb Zurekh
- Berta Litwina as Tsippe
- Eni Liton as Leah
- Jakob Rajnglas as apprentice shoemaker
- Maks Brin as Szames
- Samuel Landau as Mekhele Zaidman
- Samuel Landau as Fyvel
