= The Flat (2011 film) =

2011 film by Arnon Goldfinger

- Theatrical poster
- הדירה
- Directed by: Arnon Goldfinger
- Written by: Arnon Goldfinger
- Produced by: Arnon Goldfinger; Thomas Kufus
- Cinematography: Phillipe Bellaiche; Talia (Tulik) Galon
- Edited by: Tali Halter Shenkar
- Music by: Yoni Rechter
- Distributed by: Ruth Diskin Films, Sundance Selects, Edition Salzgeber
- Release dates: September 5, 2011 (Israel); June 14, 2012 (Germany); October 19, 2012 (USA)
- Running time: 97 minutes
- Countries: Israel; Germany
- Languages: Hebrew; English; German

The Flat (Hebrew: הדירה) is a 2011 feature documentary film, an Israeli–German co-production written and directed by Arnon Goldfinger. It was theatrically released in Israel in September 2011. It played continuously for thirteen months and has received rave reviews. Time Out Tel Aviv chose to place the film at the top of its recommended films for 49 weeks under the headline: "not to be missed" and chose it as one of the 25 most important art works from around the world for 2011. The Flat was theatrically released in Germany in June 2012. The German version of the film features the voice of renowned German actor Axel Milberg taking on the role of narrator Arnon Goldfinger. The Flat was theatrically released in USA in October 2012 and was theatrically released in Hungary in April 2015.

The film won the 2012 Best Editing in a Documentary Feature Award in the Tribeca Film Festival World Documentary Competition. It was the opening film at Dok Munich in 2012. The flat was one of the final three nominees for the German Academy Film Awards 2013 ("Lola"). and nominated for the German TV Grimme Awards 2014.

== Plot ==
The film opens as the director and members of his family are gathered in the apartment of his mother's mother, Gerda Tuchler, a short while after her death, to clear out the contents. His grandmother lived in the same apartment for 70 years, ever since she and her husband, Kurt, left Nazi Germany in the 1930s and immigrated to Israel (Mandatory Palestine.)

It is not long, however, before Goldfinger finds various items in his grandmother's house that reveal an astonishing chapter in the family's history – a chapter that had been kept under wraps for decades.

Goldfinger gradually discovers that his grandparents had a close personal relationship with a high Nazi official, Leopold von Mildenstein, head of the SS Office for Jewish Affairs (prior to Adolf Eichmann). Mildenstein traveled to Palestine accompanied by the Tuchlers in 1930, and wrote a few sympathetic reports of its Jewish community in the sheer Nazi 'Der Angriff' (founded by Joseph Goebbels). Mildenstein resumed his friendship with the Tuchlers after the war.

== Production ==
After his grandmother's death Arnon Goldfinger began, all alone, to film the clearing out of his grandmother's flat. By chance Goldfinger met cinematographer Talya (Tulik) Galon, who lives not far from his grandmother's flat, and told her about the flat. She helped with the cinematography (Philip Bellaiche entered the production later on). They filmed the family rummaging through closets, the items with their old-fashioned European flavor that were pulled out one after another – and the dozens of garbage bags that filled up quickly. But Goldfinger and the others did not know exactly what they were looking for. And then it happened: Suddenly among the cartons of gloves and shoes, the fox furs and the purses, the books and the boxes with letters – a pile of old German newspapers appeared. Goldfinger did not imagine that this would be the first clue that would lead him on an emotional journey that would be both upsetting and confusing, and that would reveal a family history that for years had been repressed and hidden. At that point the research broadened and new characters emerged, unexpected ones. The crew expanded until the point that the film became a German-Israeli coproduction with Zero One Film coming on board as co-producers.

Goldfinger worked for five years till finishing the film that is being supported by New Israeli Foundation for Cinema and Television, Filmförderungsanstalt, Medienboard Berlin-Brandenburg, Deutscher Filmförderfonds with ARTE, ZDF, SWR, Noga Communications- Channel 8.

== Reception ==
=== Critical reception ===
The Flat had its premiere at the Jerusalem Film Festival in July 2011. The film was screened in 35mm and in the review following the screening, film critic Avner Shavit called The Flat "one of the best Israeli documentaries ever made". He added that "one of the most exciting documents on the Shoah. The audience at the theater yesterday were overwhelmed by the experience".

Both screenings during the festival were sold out and quite a few critics claimed that The Flat was the best Israeli film at the festival. The film won the prize for best director of a documentary film at the Jerusalem Film Festival, with the jury reasoning: "This is a beautifully composed film about uncomfortable truths and the challenge of confronting them. Mr. Goldfinger undertakes expert research and leads us through his findings in a way that is not only gentle and sensitive, but also compelling and creative".

A month and half later, in September 2011, the film was theatrically released. At first the film was only screened twice a week in Tel Aviv and Jerusalem. All of these screenings were sold out. On the heels of this success it was decided to expand the release to additional parts of the country. The Flat has been playing continuously for eight months and has become the third most viewed Israeli film of 2011. In his review in the leading Israeli newspaper Yediot Achronot, film critic Yehuda Stav gave the film 5 stars and said the following: "Arnon Goldfinger's spellbinding work The Flat is one of the most intriguing and important documentary films made in Israel in the last decade. This is not only because of its unbelievable subject matter, but because of its meticulous weaving, its artistry of filmmaking and above all because of the complexity of issues that are addressed and the deep emotional impact they have on the viewer."

=== Awards ===
- Ophir Award:
  - Best Documentary (won)
- Bavarian Film Award
  - Best Documentary (won)
- Jerusalem Film Festival Award
  - Best Director of a Documentary (won)
- The Israeli Documentary Filmmakers Forum Award
  - Best Film (won)
- The Israeli Documentary Filmmakers Forum Award
  - Best Director (won)
- The Israeli Documentary Filmmakers Forum Award
  - Best Research (won)
- Minneapolis St. Paul IFF 2012
  - Best Documentary (won)
- The German Arthouse cinema Guild 2012 Award
  - Best Documentary (won)
- Toronto Jewish Film Festival 2012
  - Best Documentary, David e. Stein Award (won)
- Tribeca Film Festival 2012
  - Best Editing Documentary (won)
- Kraków Film Festival 2012
  - FIPRESCI Award (won)
- Traverse City Film Festival 2012
  - Jury Prize – Foreign Film (won)
- New Zealand Doc Edge 2012
  - Honorable mention (won)
- Jewish Motifs International Film Festival Warsaw 2013
  - GRAND PRIX – Golden Warsaw Phoenix (won)
- German Academy Film Awards, "Lola" 2013
  - Best Documentary (nominated)
- Adolf Grimme Awards, Germany 2014
  - Best Documentary (nominated)

== See also ==
- Leopold von Mildenstein
