= Ben-Zion Witler =

Ben-Zion Witler (1907–1961), also Ben-Tsion Vitler, BenZion Wittler, was a Jewish singer, actor, coupletist, comedian and composer.

== Early life ==
At the age of six Witler moved with his family from Belz, Galisia (now in Ukraine), to Vienna, where he received a strict Chasidic religious upbringing.

== Career ==
In 1919, at the age of 12, he joined the Freie jüdische Volksbühne theater in Vienna (1919–1922; no connection to the New York Folksbiene), secretly and under an alias, fearing his family's reaction. He worked briefly as a journalist at the German Zionist weekly Wiener Morgenzeitung (Vienna Morning Times), but in 1926 returned to the Vienna theater scene, performing in comedies and operettas, studying opera repertoire with Yulianovsky and Fuchs, touring (Paris, London, South Africa, France and Vienna).

Witler spent three years in Poland in the mid-1930s, becoming a "public darling." In 1937 he appeared in Riga in A Khasene in Shtetl and The Galitzian Wedding by William Siegel. Some of his many other starring roles were in Yanko the Gypsy, A Millionaire's Caprice, The American Litvak, The Brave Officer, The Bandit Gentleman, The Strength of Love, The Bride with Three Brothers, The Golden Bridegroom, The Threshold of Joy, It's Hard to be a Jew by Sholom Aleichem, Ansky's The Dybbuk, Jacob Mikhailovich Gordin's God, Man and Devil, and David Pinski's Yankel the Smith.

Starting in 1940 he toured the U.S., playing at NYC's Hopkinson Theater in Siegel's Forgotten Women and Chicago's Douglas Theater in Siegel's A Golden Dream. In 1946 he toured Argentina, at Buenos Aires Mitre Theater in Kalmanovitsh's "Home Sweet Home." He performed with Argentinian-born actress Shifra Lerer, his wife, through North and South America, Israel, and South Africa through the 1950s.

== Recorded songs ==
He recorded hundreds of songs; his hits included:

- Gelibte (Beloved)
- Dzhankoye
- Varshe (Warsaw)
- Akhtsik er, zibetsik zi (He's 80, She's 70)
- Byalostok
- Mayn alte heym
- Oyfn veg shteyt a boym
- Leb un Lakh
- Krokhmalne Gas
- Zing, Brider, Zing!
- Belz
- Rozhinkes Mit Mandlen (Raisens and Almonds)

== In popular culture ==
In the German TV drama Die Zweiflers (S1.E2, 2024) a tape of music by Ben-Zion Witler is pulled out from the glove compartment of the car of the Yiddish-speaking character Symcha Zweifler and played.
