= Julius Adler (actor) =

Polish-born American actor (1906–1994)

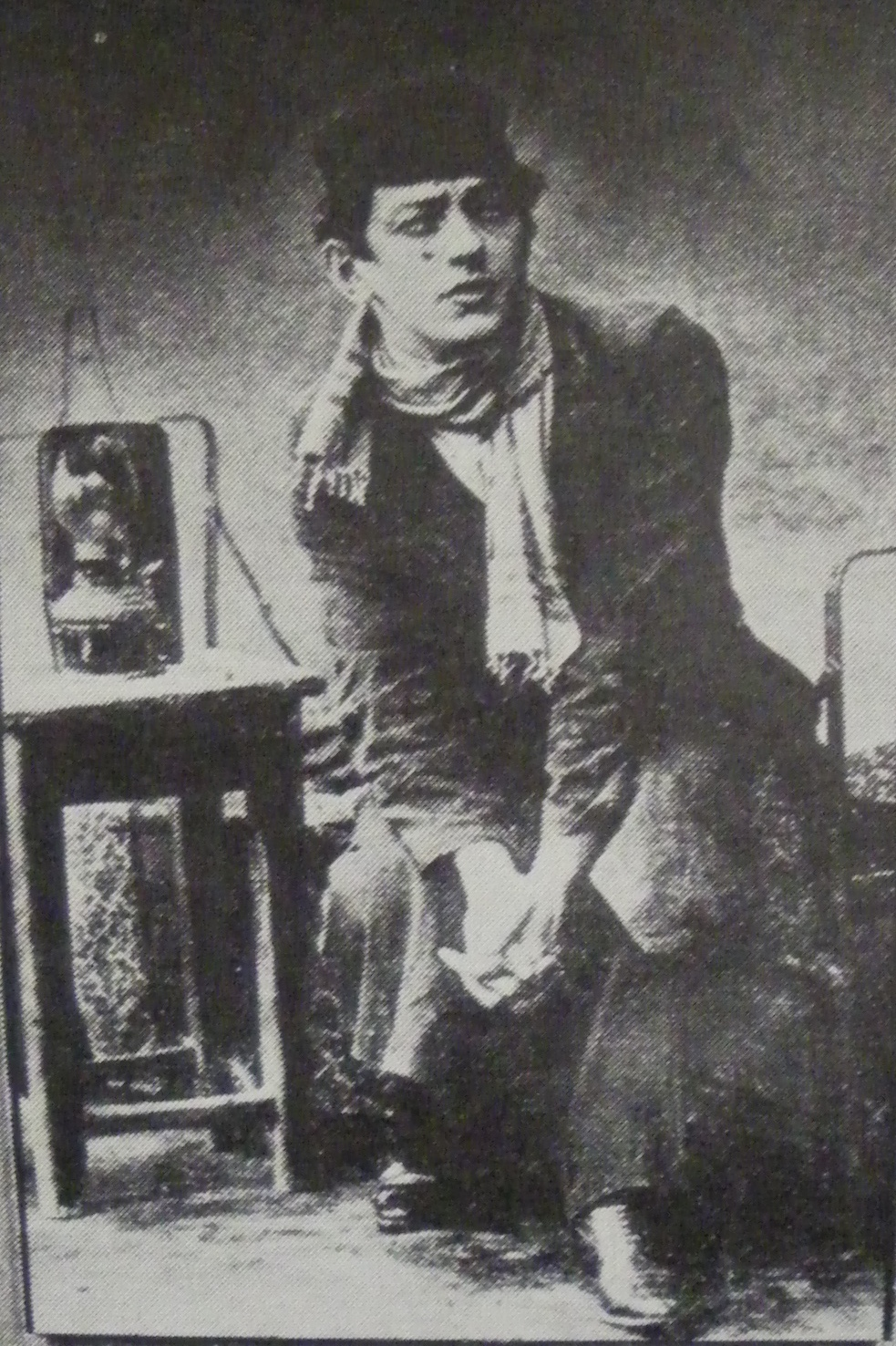
- Adler in Nokhum Rakov's Talmud Khokhem, 1930
- Born: September 23, 1906; Biłgoraj, Poland
- Died: December 28, 1994 (aged 88)
- Resting place: Mount Hebron Cemetery, New York City, U.S.
- Occupations: Actor, writer, director
- Spouse: Henrietta Jacobson (m. 1938)
- Children: Bruce Adler
- Family: Hymie Jacobson (brother in-law)

Julius Adler (September 23, 1906 – December 28, 1994) was a Polish-born American actor, writer, and director in Yiddish theater.

== Career ==
He was born in Biłgoraj, Poland, into an Orthodox Jewish family. When his father died six years later his mother emigrated to America leaving the children with grandparents. In 1920 the family was reunited in the United States and Julius began to work in theater. He played with Julius Nathanson, Leon Blank, Boris Thomashevsky, Aaron Lebedeff, Samuel Goldenberg, Jennie Goldstein, and others. He originally trained as a hat maker; when his stepfather learned of his desire to become an actor, Adler was put out of the family home. He got as far as the fire escape where he slept and where his mother gave him food. When Adler's stepfather learned about the amount of money his stepson was making in his acting career, he was invited to move back into the family apartment.

== Later life and career ==
In 1935, he met Henrietta Jacobson while both were appearing with Herman Yablokoff (Hayim Yablonik) in McKinley Square Theater. She was a divorcee with a young son from a prior marriage. Henrietta had deep roots in the Jewish theater community. Her parents, Joseph and Bessie, were Yiddish theater stars at the beginning of the 20th century, and her brothers, Hymie and Irving, not only performed but owned several prominent Yiddish theaters in New York City. When her father died, Henrietta was just seven weeks old; Bessie continued to perform and brought her four children up as performers also. Julius and Henrietta formed a team and performed together for three years. When they had an offer to perform in Belgium, Julius proposed by remarking that they could save money on visas and other expenses as a married couple. Henrietta accepted and they were married in 1938.

Adler was accepted into the Hebrew Actors Union in 1938 and with his wife toured France, Lithuania, and Belgium. They then played in Chicago, then at the Hopkonson Theater and made a revue film. They played with Molly Picon and Jacob Kalich at the Second Avenue Theater in the Yiddish Theater District; in 1948 they played in London. In 1950 he became director of the National Theater and produced Yiddish vaudeville. The couple also wrote plays. Their son, Bruce Adler (Borekh Yosl, born 1944) played Yiddish theater when he was young. He also later worked on Broadway and was nominated for two Tony Awards. The Adler family played the London Palladium with Sophie Tucker in the 1950s.

Adler also did some work in films, beginning in 1926 with Broken Hearts. He had an uncredited role as the High Priest in the 1935 film, She. Adler was cast as Aleksei (the priest) for the film Tevya (1939). The musical Fiddler on the Roof was based on this film, though this early version of the story was non-musical. His last film role was as a comedian in the 1950 Catskill Honeymoon,

Adler and his wife were performing in non-Yiddish theater by the 1960s. In 1973, they were the stars of a St. Petersburg, Florida production of Come Blow Your Horn. Their son, Bruce, was also cast in the play as the younger brother.

== Death ==
The couple is buried in the Yiddish Theatrical Alliance section (Block 67) of Mount Hebron Cemetery. The section is reserved for those who were part of New York's Yiddish theater and is maintained by the Alliance.
