= Hans G. Kresse =

Dutch cartoonist

- Born: Hans G. Kresse; December 3, 1921 Amsterdam, Netherlands
- Died: March 12, 1992 (aged 70) Doorweth, Netherlands
- Notable works: Eric de Noorman; Indianenreeks; Vidocq
- Awards: full list

Hans G. Kresse (3 December 1921 – 12 March 1992) was a Dutch cartoonist. He was the winner of the 1976 Stripschapprijs.

== Biography ==
Hans G. Kresse, born in the Netherlands in 1921, started his career as a comics artist in 1938 for the scouting magazine De Verkenner. He joined the Toonder Studios in 1944, where he worked on a variety of comics, starting with the typical Toonder-style animal comic Robby, but soon changing to the first of Kresse's realistic works like De Gouden Dolk (1946). It was in this historical realistic style that he would continue to work for the remainder of his career. In the 1950s, he was also active as an illustrator for Donald Duck written by Dick Dreux.

The same year, he created his magnum opus, the Viking series Eric de Noorman. As was typical for Dutch comics at the time, it was a comic with the text below the drawings instead of inside text balloons. The comic first appeared in the Flemish newspaper Het Laatste Nieuws, and was later also published in the Netherlands and in Wallonia in French. The series continued until 1964, and a spinoff series Erwin, de Zoon van Erik de Noorman started as a regular ballon comic in 1966.

During and after those years, Kresse created many one shot comics and contributed numerous illustrations to many Dutch youth magazines. The most famous of his comics of these years are Matho Tonga, Vidocq, Mangas Coloradas and Alain d'Arcy.

His second main series, Les Peaux-Rouges, depicting the history of the Native Americans during the Spanish conquests of North America, debuted in 1973. Published at the famous French language editor Casterman, Kresse worked on it until 1982, when he had to retire due to failing eyesight.

== Cartoons ==
- Tarzan van de apen (Tarzan of the Apes; 1938–1940), in book format 1983
- Tom Texan (1940–1941), in book format 1983
- Siegfried (1943–1944), in book format 1990
- Robby (1945–1946), in book format 1986
- Per atoomraket naar Mars (By Nuclear Rocket to Mars; 1945), in book format 1945, 1948, 1986
- De gouden dolk (The Gold Dagger; 1946), in book format 1946, 1948, 1976
- Eric de Noorman (Eric the Norman; 1946–1964), in book format since 1948
- De grote otter (The Giant Otter; 1946), in book format 1946, 1953, 1994
- Xander (1947–1948), in book format 1974, 1990
- Detective Kommer (1947–1948), in book format 1949, 1950
- Matho Tonga (1948–1954), in book format 1977
- De zoon van het oerwoud (Son of the Jungle; 1954), in book format 1994
- Het Schatteneiland (Treasure Island; 1954), in book format 1994
- Roland de Jonge Jager (Roland the Young Hunter; 1957)
- Pim en de Venusman (Pim and the Man from Venus; 1959–1960)
- Zorro (1964–1967), in book format 1974, 2005
- De boogschutter (The Archer; 1965)
- Spin en Marty (Spin and Marty; 1965)
- Bonanza (1965–1966), in book format 2007
- Vidocq (1965–1970, 1986–1988), in book format 1970, 1977, 1978, 1980, 1990, 1991, 1995
- Erwin, de zoon van Eric de Noorman (Erwin, Son of Eric the Norman; 1966–1975), in book format 1970, 1973 (2 books)
- Minimic (1970)
- Mangas Coloradas (1971–1972), in book format 1973, 1993
- Wetamo (1972–1973), in book format 1973, 1992
- Indian series (1973–1982):

1. De Meesters van de Donder (Masters of the Thunder, 1973, 1979)
2. De Kinderen van de Wind (Children of the Wind, 1973, 1979)
3. De Gezellen van het Kwaad (Companions of Evil, 1974, 1979)
4. De Zang van de Prairiewolven (Song of the Prairie Wolves, 1974, 1979)
5. De Weg van de Wraak (Route of Revenge, 1975, 1978)
6. De Welp en de Wolf (Cub and the Wolf, 1976)
7. De Gierenjagers (Vulture Hunters, 1978)
8. De Prijs van de Vrijheid (Price of Freedom, 1979)
9. De Eer van een Krijger (Honor of a Warrior, 1982)
10. De Lokroep van Quivera (Lure of Quivera, unfinished), in book format 2001

- Alain d'Arcy (1976–1978), in book format 1979, 1980, 1980/1981
