= Ein Nazi fährt nach Palästina =

1934 series of articles in Der Angriff

Ein Nazi fährt nach Palästina (A Nazi Travels to Palestine) is a 12-part article series by German journalist and junior SS schluss officer Leopold von Mildenstein, documenting his journey to Mandatory Palestine in 1933 alongside Kurt Tuchler, a Berlin Zionist. The series was published in September and October 1934 in the Nazi newspaper Der Angriff under the pseudonym "Lim", an acronym for Mildenstein's surname in reverse as written in Hebrew. Joseph Goebbels had the work printed also in the Völkische Beobachter, the newspaper of the Nazi Party.

== Background ==
In April 1933, von Mildenstein and Tuchler, along with their wives, embarked on a trip to Palestine. Tuchler aimed to demonstrate the development of a "national home" for Jews, seeking to convince von Mildenstein that Jewish emigration could be a solution to the Nazi's "Jewish question". This visit was part of a broader strategy by the Zionist Federation of Germany (ZVfD) to facilitate Jewish emigration through negotiations with the Nazi regime, which was exploring various options for removing Jews from Germany.

== Content and themes ==
Von Mildenstein's articles explored several questions about the future of Palestine and the viability of Zionism in what he described as the "turbulent Orient".

Contrary to the derogatory stereotypes prevalent in Nazi propaganda, von Mildenstein depicted the Jewish settlers in Palestine as optimistic and industrious, a direct contradiction to the Nazi portrayal of Jews.

== Commemorative medal ==
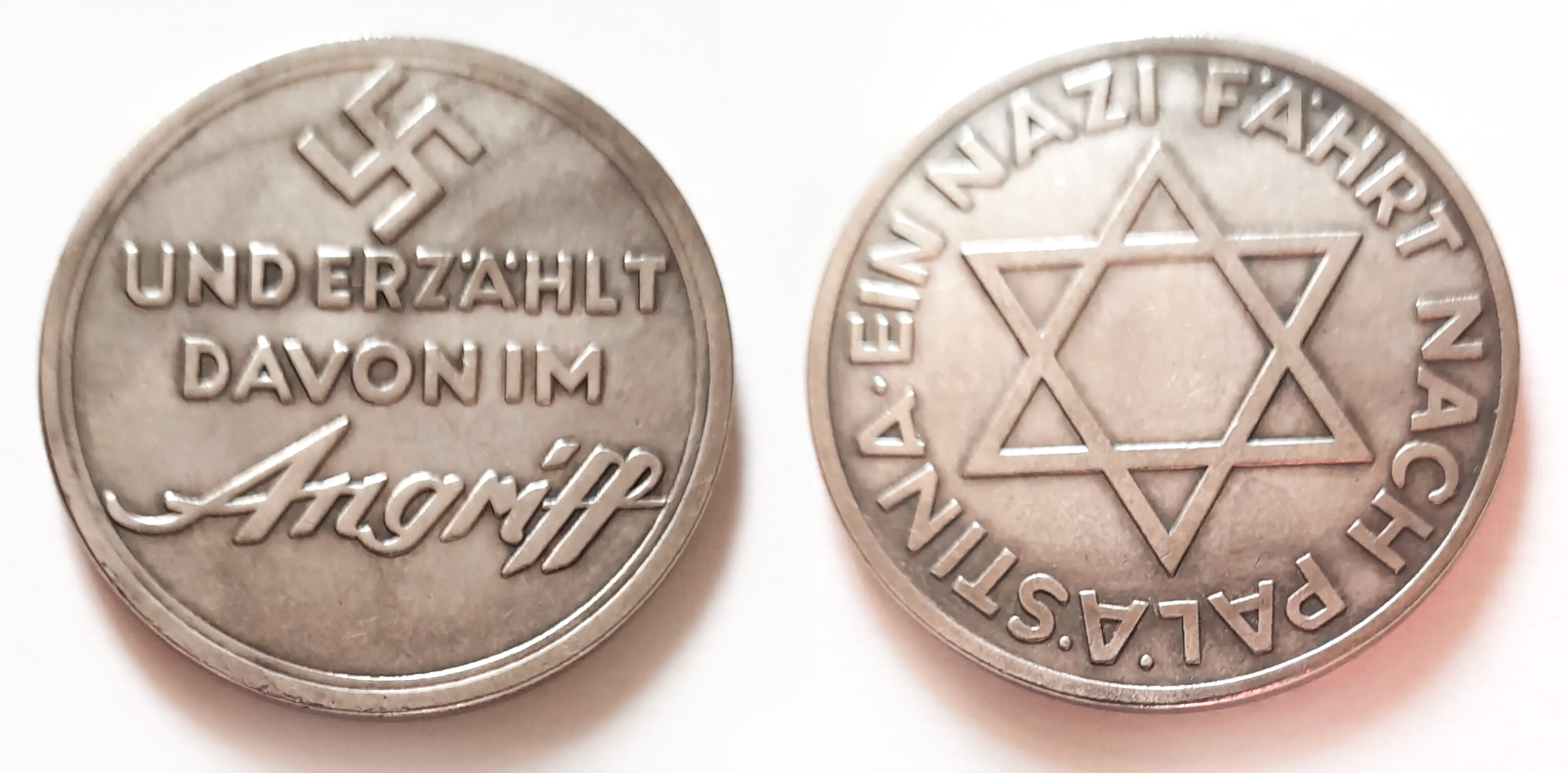
Obverse and Reverse of the medal for the article Ein Nazi fährt nach Palästina

The series was heavily promoted in Nazi Germany, including the distribution of a commemorative medal featuring a swastika and a Star of David to subscribers of "Der Angriff" ("The Attack").
