= Leopold von Mildenstein =

German writer and SS junior officer (1902–1968)

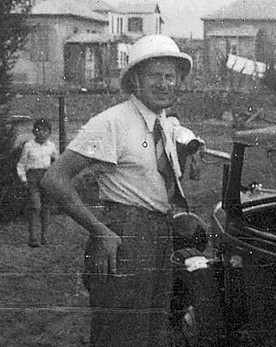
- Leopold von Mildenstein in Palestine in 1933
- Born: 30 November 1902; Prague, Austria-Hungary
- Died: November 1968 (aged 65–66); West Germany
- Military career
- Allegiance: Nazi Germany
- Branch: SS
- Service years: 1932–1945
- Rank: Officer
- Nickname: LIM
- Other work: Writer, press officer

Leopold Itz Edler von Mildenstein (30 November 1902 – November 1968) was an SS officer who is remembered as a leading supporter in the Nazi Party of some of the aims of Zionism during the 1930s.

He sometimes worked as a writer and signed his work with his initials, LIM. In English, he has sometimes been called a baron, although his rank of Edler means 'nobleman' and has no exact equivalent; perhaps the nearest translation is 'esquire'.

After the Second World War, Mildenstein continued to live in West Germany, where he joined the Free Democratic Party and was elected to its Press Committee. In 1956, he went to Egypt to work for a radio station, and after the capture of Adolf Eichmann in 1960 he claimed immunity as an intelligence agent of the US Central Intelligence Agency, a claim which was neither confirmed nor denied. Nothing was heard of him after 1964, when he published a book on cocktails.

== Life up to 1945 ==
Born in 1902 in Prague, then part of Austria-Hungary, Mildenstein belonged to the lowest tier of the Austrian nobility and was brought up as a Roman Catholic. He had Austrian, Hungarian, Czech, and German citizenships. He trained as an engineer and joined the Nazi Party in 1929, receiving the membership number 106,678. In 1932 he joined the SS, becoming one of the first Austrians to do so. According to Dieter Wisliceny, his former SS colleague, Mildenstein visited the Middle East, including British-administered Palestine, several times until 1935. On 30 January 1933 Adolf Hitler came to power as Chancellor of Germany.

Mildenstein had taken an early interest in Zionism, even going so far as to attend Zionist conferences to help deepen his understanding of the movement. He actively promoted Zionism as a way out of the official impasse on the "Jewish question": as a way of making Germany judenrein ('clean of Jews'). Some Zionists, whose movement had grown tremendously in popularity among German Jews since Hitler came to power, co-operated. On 7 April 1933, the Jüdische Rundschau, the bi-weekly paper of the Zionist movement, declared that of all Jewish groups only the Zionist Federation of Germany was capable of approaching the Nazis in good faith as "honest partners". The Federation then commissioned Kurt Tuchler, an acquaintance of Mildenstein, to make contact with possible Zionist sympathisers within the Nazi Party. Tuchler hoped to convince Mildenstein's circle that the Nazis should openly promote Jewish nationalism. Tuchler asked Mildenstein to write something positive about Jewish homeland in the press. Mildenstein agreed, on condition that he be allowed to visit Palestine in person, with Tuchler as his guide. So, in the spring of 1933, a party of four set out from Berlin, consisting of Mildenstein, Tuchler, and their wives. They spent a month together in Palestine, and Mildenstein began to write a series of articles for Der Angriff, a Nazi Party newspaper in Berlin, founded by Joseph Goebbels in 1927. According to Lenni Brenner, Mildenstein himself remained in Palestine for a total of six months before his return to Germany, and even learnt a few words of Hebrew. In August 1933 Hitler's government and German Zionists entered into the Haavara Agreement, which encouraged emigration by allowing Jews to transfer property and funds from Germany to Palestine.

On 24 May 1934, the Judenreferat, then led by Walter Ilges, sent Reinhard Heydrich, the new Director of the Gestapo, a memorandum stating that the only answer to the Jewish Question was the emigration of all Jews from Germany. It recommended investigating all possible destinations and then working on delivery. While there was no mention of Palestine, the Zionists were suggested as a possible key to success. This memorandum, together with the urging of Mildenstein that Zionism was the solution to the Jewish Question, led Heydrich to adopt emigration of the Jews as a firm policy and to hire Mildenstein.

Between 9 September and 9 October 1934, Der Angriff published a series of twelve pro-Zionist reports by Mildenstein, entitled A Nazi Goes to Palestine, in honour of which the newspaper issued a commemorative medallion, cast with the swastika on one side and the Star of David on the other. Goebbels then had the work printed also in the Völkische Beobachter, the newspaper of the Nazi Party.

From August 1934 to June 1936, Mildenstein worked in the headquarters of the Sicherheitsdienst (SD), the security service of the SS, in Section II/112, in charge of the Jewish Desk, with the title of Judenreferent ('Jewish affairs officer'). This title meant that he was responsible for reporting on "Jewish Affairs" under the overall command of Heydrich. During those years, Mildenstein favoured a policy of encouraging Germany's Jewish population to emigrate to Palestine, and in pursuit of this policy he developed positive contacts with Zionist organisations. SS officials were even instructed to encourage the activities of the Zionists within the Jewish community, who were to be favoured over the assimilationists, said to be the real danger to Nazism.

Adolf Eichmann, later one of the most significant organisers of the Holocaust, believed that his big break came in 1934, when he had a meeting with Mildenstein, a fellow-Austrian, in the Wilhelmstraße and was invited to join Mildenstein's department. Eichmann later stated that Mildenstein rejected the vulgar antisemitism of Streicher. Soon after his arrival in the section Mildenstein gave Eichmann a book on Judaism by Adolf Böhm, a leading Jew from Vienna.

In the summer of 1935, then holding the rank of SS-Untersturmführer, Mildenstein attended the 19th Congress of the Zionist Organization in Lucerne, Switzerland, as an observer attached to the German Jewish delegation.

Mildenstein's pro-Zionist line was overtaken by events, and after a dispute with Heydrich in 1936 he was removed from his post and transferred to the Foreign Ministry's press department. He had fallen out of favour because migration to Palestine was not happening quickly enough. His departure from the SD also saw a shift in SS policy, marked by the publication of a pamphlet written by Eichmann warning of the dangers of a strong Jewish state in the Middle East. Mildenstein was replaced as the head of his former section by Kuno Schroeder. Later in December 1939, Eichmann was made chief of the Jewish Department Referat IV B4 of the RSHA, of which the SD became a part in September 1939.

As Germany moved into the Second World War, Mildenstein continued to write propaganda articles and books, including "Around the Burning Land of the Jordan" (1938) and "The Middle East Seen from the Roadside" (1941).

== Life after the war ==
After the war, Mildenstein's works were placed on the list of proscribed literature in the Soviet occupation zone and later in the German Democratic Republic. Like the Haavara Agreement, Mildenstein's visit to Palestine in 1933, the medal to commemorate it, and the pro-Zionist articles in the Nazi newspaper Der Angriff, they were unwelcome evidence of a relationship between the Nazis and Zionism during the 1930s.

Mildenstein visited the United States in 1954, having been granted a visa to do so at the request of the government of West Germany. In January 1956, he asked the US Embassy in Bonn to help him obtain an exchange grant for journalists, although he was not one. By then a member of the Free Democratic Party, in May 1956 he was elected to its Press Committee. In December 1956, a CIA report from Cairo confirmed that he had been employed by the Egyptian government of Gamal Abdul Nasser to work for its Voice of the Arabs radio station. In June 1960, soon after the capture of Eichmann by Mossad agents in Buenos Aires on 11 May 1960, Mildenstein announced that he had had an operational relationship with the CIA and as a former US intelligence agent claimed immunity from prosecution. This relationship was neither confirmed nor denied by the CIA.

In 1964, Mildenstein published a new book on the mixing of cocktails, including some non-alcoholic ones, but after that no more was heard of him until he died in November 1968.

In 2011, the Israeli director Arnon Goldfinger, a grandson of Mildenstein's companions the Tuchlers, produced a film called The Flat, in which Mildenstein's friendship with his grandparents is discussed at length. Goldfinger's film showed that his grandparents had kept in touch with the Mildensteins after the war. Having researched in the German National Archives, Goldfinger states that Mildenstein joined the Ministry of Propaganda under Goebbels in 1938 and that he later worked as a press officer for Coca-Cola in West Germany until the public Eichmann hearings of 1961, in which Eichmann named him as "the specialist in Jewish affairs." The film ends with an interview in which Goldfinger discusses his findings with Mildenstein's daughter Edda Milz. He has described this scene as "highly conflict-laden" and has said of it "I wanted to show Edda von Mildenstein as a victim of her own father and his lies." Goldfinger finds that she remembers his grandparents and knows more about their lives than he had known himself.

== See also ==
- Glossary of Nazi Germany
- List of Nazi Party leaders and officials
- List of SS personnel

== Sources ==
- Boas, Jacob (1980). "A Nazi Travels to Palestine". History Today. 30 (1): 33–38.
- Padfield, Peter (2001) [1990]. Himmler: Reichsführer-SS. London: Cassel & Co. ISBN 978-0-304-35839-7.
- Shirer, William Lawrence (1960). The Rise and Fall of the Third Reich: A History of Nazi Germany. New York City: Simon & Schuster. ASIN B0766DKDLR. LCCN 60006729. OCLC 1286630. OL 5794925M. Wikidata Q138029595.
- Silberklang, David, ed. (16 July 2009). "n.t.". Yad Vashem Studies. 37 (Part 1). Jerusalem: KTAV Publishing House. ISBN 9653083813.
- Stollberg (1938). n.t. Berlin: n.p.
- Union (1941). n.t. Stuttgart: n.p.
