= Miriam Kressyn =

American actress

- Died: October 28, 1996 (aged 86)

Miriam Kressyn (March 4, 1910 – October 28, 1996), one of the "First Ladies of the Yiddish Theater", acted and sang on stage, film and radio; she wrote plays as well.

== Personal life ==
Kressyn was born in Białystok, Poland, the seventh child of Mashe and Yankev Kressyn. It was a poor family; her father made his living traveling to village fairs. Not being able to support the family, he emigrated to the United States, bringing two of his daughters, but three years later he traveled home alone. Miriam became a member of the kleyn bund but threatened with arrest for "smuggling literature" she went to America with the whole family and settled in Boston.

"By the time she arrived in Boston, Massachusetts, in 1925, Miriam was fluent in six languages." Her mother sold a feather-bed to pay for her education. She won a $5000 scholarship to study music abroad after winning a contest between the best high school singers in New England. She also attended New England Conservatory of Music on a scholarship. When Julius and Anna Nathanson, playing in Freeman's Goldene Kaleh in Boston, happened to hear Kressyn, they persuaded her to join their chorus. She played small roles with Max Gebil in Khuppah-kleyd (Wedding dress), with Ludwig Satz in Der gazlen (The Thief) and with Leon Blank in The Three Brides. She didn't consider this to be a career, as she was studying law at Northeastern University.

Her dancing ability ... bordered on the acrobatic (she was able to do a backward bend and pick up a rose from the stage with her teeth).

Hy Jacobson drew her further into Yiddish theater; she performed with him and Aaron Lebedeff at the Londiel Theater. In 1930-31 she played at Philadelphia's Arch Street Theater (managed by Hymie Jacobson, May Sieman and Simone Woolf). In 1933 she married Jacobson and they toured in Argentina, Berlin, England, France, Lithuania, Latvia and Poland. She played the leading role (Esther) in Joseph Green's 1937 film Der Purimshpiler opposite her husband, with Zigmund Turkow as a traveling Purim player. She toured with Jacobsen in America and then in 1938 they returned to Poland and toured South Africa in 1939.

Returning to America, they took part in Maurice Schwartz's "Yiddish Art Theater" in Sholem Aleichem's Ven ikh bin Rotschild (If I were Rothschild). After touring in Argentina, Brazil, and London, they returned to America. In 1943, she married actor Seymour Rechtzeit (aka Seymour Rexite); they worked in the National Theater, the Public Theater, the Second Avenue Theater, and others, co-starring with Menasha Skulnik, Michael Mikhalesko, Fuchs, A. Grossman, Zyenda, and Irving Jacobson. She performed on the radio show The Forward's Hour in pieces by Isaac Bashevis Singer, Osip Dymov, Moshe Dluznowsky and Kadia Molodowsky. For many years she had her own show, as singer and commentator, on WEVD; she wrote the show herself. Another such show was Treft zikh mit Miriam Kressyn. She composed Yiddish lyrics for Misirlou.

She and her husband became known as the romantic idols of Yiddish musicals. Often she was featured in a cast with other Yiddish theater favorites, including Reizl Bozyk, Ben Bonus, Leo Fuchs, Mina Bern and Jacob Jacobs.

In the late 1940s she created a Yiddish version of Philip Vordan's Anna Lucasta (a Broadway hit being performed by an all-negro cast) with Ben-Zion Witler playing the romantic lead; the play was a great success. In the 1960s she became Professor of Yiddish at Queens College, New York, where she also directed Yiddish plays.

In 1984 she was interviewed in Almonds and Raisins, a documentary about Yiddish talking films made in the United States and Europe between the release of The Jazz Singer in 1927 and the outbreak of the Second World War in 1939. She continued to teach drama at Queens College until shortly before her death in 1996 at age 86. Kressyn was the recipient of many awards.

Seymour Rechtzeit died in 2002, aged 91; the couple had no children. They are buried in the Yiddish Theatrical Alliance's Block 67 at Mount Hebron Cemetery; the section is reserved for the Yiddish theater community and is maintained by the Alliance.

== Filmography ==
- The Jewish Gypsy, 1930, with Hy Jacobson, director Sydney Goldin
- The Sailor's Sweetheart, 1933, with Hy Jacobson, director Sydney Goldin
- Der Purimshpiler, 1937, with Zygmunt Turkow and Hymie Jacobson, also Ajzyk Samberg, Maks Bozyk, Berta Litwina, Eni Liton, Jakum Fiszer, and others. Set of the shtetl was built on a backlot in Warsaw; exteriors shot partially in Kraków. Dialog by Itzik Manger.
- Geleb un gelakht (Live and Laugh), 1933, with Hymie Jacobson, Max Wilner, Pincus Lavenda, Yudel Dubinsky, Celina Breene, Seymour Reichtzeit, Chaim Tauber, Mae Simon, Eddie Friedlander, Eva Miller, Cantor Josef Rosenblatt, Tamara, Menasha Skulnick, Joseph Buloff, Boris Rosenthal, Jack Shargel, Meyer Machtenberg, Sadie Banks.
