= Seymour Rexite =

American actor

Seymour Rexite (January 18, 1914 – October 14, 2002), originally Shayele Rechtzeit, was a Polish American singer and actor. He was a significant figure in Yiddish theatre in the United States, and with his wife Miriam Kressyn he performed on the radio over four decades, performing pop standards in Yiddish. He also served as president of the Hebrew Actors' Union.

Born in Piotrków Trybunalski, Congress Poland, and a child prodigy, Rexite immigrated to the United States in 1920, along with his father, a cantor, and his older brother Jack Rechtzeit, an actor and songwriter. Several years later, immigration quotas prevented Rexite's mother and other siblings from emigrating from Poland, so Rexite sang a song, which his brother Jack had composed, before President Calvin Coolidge which so moved that he granted them entry visas.

At age 13, he took over the lead in the Yiddish musical The Rabbi's Melody when 30-year-old Ludwig Satz left to play in Potash and Perlmutter on Broadway. Unlike Satz, who had been a grown man playing a teenage boy, he was the actual age of the character. He later starred in The Song of the Ghetto at a theatre on Second Avenue in the Yiddish Theater District opposite the famous soprano Isa Kremer. He first appeared on the radio, singing in Yiddish, in 1927. In the 1930s he flirted with crossover success, performing with The Dorsey Brothers in late-night shows at Billy Rose's Casino de Paree, but decided to focus on the Yiddish-language side of his career.

He married Miriam Kressyn, another star of the Yiddish stage, in 1943. The two had a long-running radio program on WEVD radio, performing Yiddish translations of pop music standards (largely their own translations of everything from Irving Berlin to Man of La Mancha) as well as songs written in his native language.

Kressyn died at age 86 in 1996; they had no children. Rexite died in 2002 in New York City. The couple is buried under the family name Rechtzeit in Block 67 of Mount Hebron Cemetery. This section is reserved for those who were part of New York Yiddish theater and is maintained by the Yiddish Theatrical Alliance.
