= Dick Dreux =

Dutch writer (1913–1978)

- Born: Dirk Johannes Hendrik Dreux; 27 May 1913; Amsterdam, Netherlands
- Died: 6 December 1978 (aged 65); Naarden, Netherlands
- Occupations: Writer, playwright, comic artist

Dirk Johannes Hendrik "Dick" Dreux (27 May 1913 – 6 December 1978) was a Dutch writer of historical literature.

== Biography ==
Dick Dreux was born in Amsterdam as a child of Hendrik Johannes Wilhelm Dreux and Cornelia Hendrika Johanna Lucke who divorced in 1921. He grew up with his grandparents from his mother's side. He attended the Hogere Burger School and in 1929, at age 16, joined the merchant navy. His adventurous life led him around the world and finally to Spain, where he fought against Franco's fascists in the Spanish Civil War. He returned to the Netherlands just before the start of World War II in order to fulfill his military duty and keep his Dutch citizenship. He was interned in Amersfoort concentration camp, and then labored in a work camp on the German island of Borkum.

After the end of the war, he became an author, writing historical literature from a critical point of view, many of it published by the Arbeiderspers, then a socialist publishing house. Notable publications include De Grote Leugen (The Big Lie) (1966) in which he exposed militarism and the hidden agenda of the ruling class. Dreux was also active as an editorial cartoonist and wrote and drew a science fiction comic strip, Raket-Ridders (1950-1951), published in De Week in Beeld. Dreux and his wife lived in Amsterdam, and later moved to a houseboat in Bussum. He free-lanced for magazines and newspapers and then worked for VARA, writing over 450 radio plays between 1959 and 1970. He also wrote serial stories for children's magazines like Donald Duck starting in the 1950s, and a number of his stories were illustrated by Hans Kresse and published as comic books. His style was accessible and conversational, for which he credited his grandfather, a "born storyteller".

Dreux died on 6 December 1978 in hospital in Naarden, and was buried in Bussum.
