= Paulina Lavitz =

American actress

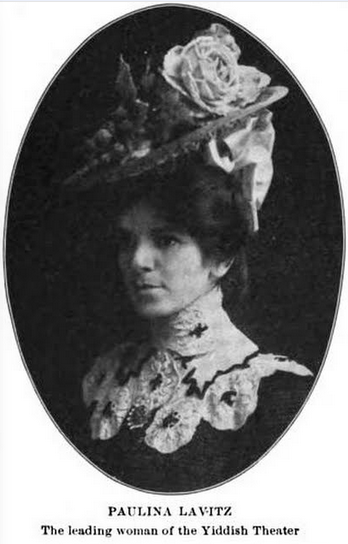
Paulina Lavitz, from a 1909 publication.

Paulina Lavitz (March 29, 1879 — September 20, 1959), also seen as Pepi Lavitz, was a Polish-born actress in American Yiddish theatre.

== Early life ==
Pilpel "Pepi" Lavitz was born in Lemberg, Galicia (now Lviv, Ukraine). Her parents were in theatre work, and her younger sister Minnie (or Minna) Birnbaum also became an actress. Lavitz started acting as a child in Europe, and trained as a singer too.

== Career ==
Paulina Lavitz was a "leading woman" in Yiddish theatre, in Chicago and New York. In Chicago she starred at International Theater with David Silbert in Queen Sabba in 1907, and appeared with Regina Prager and Fernanda Eliscu at the Metropolitan Theatre in 1909.

She was still acting into her fifties, appearing in the melodrama Married Slaves (1935) with a Yiddish theatre co-operative in New York. There are folders related to her later career in the Records of the Hebrew Actors' Union, archived at YIVO Institute for Jewish Research.

== Personal life ==
Pauline Lavitz married a physician and concert promoter, Dr. Max Brav. They had four children. She was widowed in 1954 and died in 1959, aged 80 years, in Flushing, New York. Her remains were buried in Mount Hebron Cemetery there.
