= Joseph Green (actor) =

American actor (1900–1996)

Joseph Green (April 23, 1900 – June 20, 1996), born Yoysef Grinberg, a.k.a. Josef Grünberg, Joseph Greenberg and Joseph Greene, a Polish-born Jew who emigrated to the United States in 1924, was an actor in Yiddish theater and one of the few directors of Yiddish-language films. He made four Yiddish films that he shot on location in Poland, beginning in 1935: Yidl mitn fidl (Yiddle with his Fiddle; 1935), Der Purimspiler (The Jester; 1937), Mamele (Little Mother; 1938), and A brivele der mamen (A Little Letter to Mother; 1939). He also wrote the screenplays for the films, except for Mamele.

Born in Łódź (Poland), then in Congress Poland, part of the Russian Empire, he attended a traditional Jewish cheder, or elementary school, and then a state gymnasium (high school). In 1915, during the First World War, he trained at the drama school of German theater director Walter Wassermann, who was then heading the Deutsches Theater in Lodz, and in 1916 he made his debut as an actor with the Lodz-based amateur troupe of Zalmen Zylbercweig.

Green had small roles in The Jazz Singer, in 1927, and A Daughter of her People, in 1932. Also in 1932 he provided the Yiddish-language dubbing for the silent Italian film Joseph in the Land of Egypt.

He died of emphysema at the age of 96 in Great Neck, Long Island, New York.

Green was interviewed in the 1985 British documentary on Yiddish Films, Almonds and Raisins.

== See also ==
- Abe Ellstein
- Molly Picon
