= Eric de Noorman =

Dutch comic strip

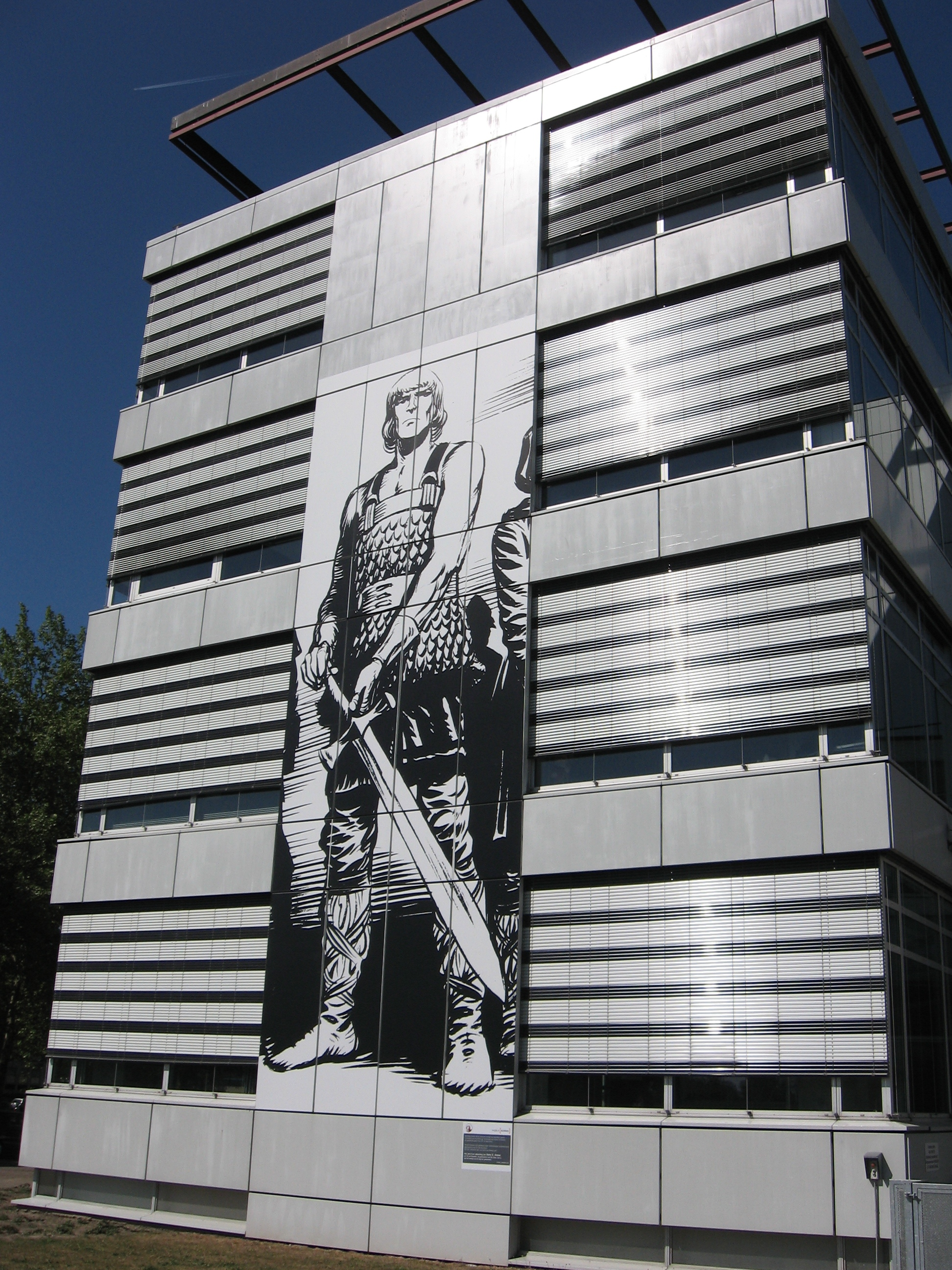
- Eric de Noorman drawn on a building wall in Arnhem, Netherlands
- Author: Hans G. Kresse
- Current status/schedule: Discontinued
- Launch date: 5 July 1946
- End date: 24 January 1964
- Syndicate(s): Panda, Antoninus Pius
- Genre(s): Historical comics, Action, adventure

Eric de Noorman ("Eric the Norseman") was a Dutch comic strip, published in text comic format, and drawn by Hans G. Kresse from 1946 until 1964. The stories featured a Viking king, Eric, and his adventures overseas. Together with Kapitein Rob and Tom Poes, Eric de Noorman is widely considered to belong to the Big Three in Dutch comics history. Kresse's well documented stories and high quality drawing are praised and have influenced many other European comics artists. Eric de Noorman is one of the few Dutch comics to gain popularity in foreign translations. In the Netherlands, it was published in Het Vaderland, De Nieuwe Haarlemsche Courant and Tom Poes Weekblad, in Flanders in Het Laatste Nieuws and De Nieuwe Gazet, in Wallonia in Le Soir. The comic has been translated into French, Danish, Finnish, German, Spanish, Swedish, Portuguese and English. From 1948 on the stories were published in oblong format books at the low price of 75 cent.

== Concept ==
Eric de Noorman is set during a vague Viking Age. Eric is a young Norse Viking king who lives together with his wife, Winonah, and son Erwin. Pum-Pum, a midget servant, is his trusty aid and advisor. He often travels abroad which brings him into all kinds of fights and adventures. In the earliest stories Eric is both seen in the Roman Empire as well as the Dark Ages of the Middle Ages. In one story he fights against Roman Emperor Commodus (177-192) in the arena. Afterwards he returns to Norway, where he is in the presence of noblemen living in castles in fashions that are more reminiscent of the 12th and 13th centuries. Apart from these anachronisms, Kresse also used a lot of fantasy elements, such as Norse mythology and the Isle of Atlantis. From the story De Witte Raaf ("The White Raven") on, Kresse used more documentation which made the stories more historically accurate. He set the stories in a specific time period, namely the 5th century. This allowed Eric to meet historical and mythological characters such as the British king Vortigern (Vitalinus), King Arthur, Attila the Hun and Flavius Aetius. Apart from historical accuracy Kresse also drew real-life locations such as Hadrian's Wall, Stonehenge, the menhir field of Carnac and the Mousa Broch. The more magical elements disappeared from the series.

Originally Kresse followed scripts by Dirk Huizinga and Waling Dijkstra, but he eventually went his own way.

== List of characters ==
- Eric: A young noble, intelligent and brave Norse king
- Winonah: Eric's beloved wife.
- Erwin: Eric's son.
- Pum-Pum: Eric's trusty midget servant.
- Yark: A bad-tempered Norwegian nobleman.
- Halfra: A nobleman who is very aware of his blue blood.
- Axe the Archer: Both a friend as well as a rival to Erwin.
- Aranrod: Axe's wife and queen of Harragh.
- Orm: The navigator. He is very pessimistic about the outcome of every adventure.
- Ragnar the Red: A pirate captain who can't be trusted.
- Cendrach: An old, but reliable builder of ships.
- Branwen: Cendrach's daughter.
- Svein Longtooth: A Saxon warrior who likes fighting.
- Baldon: Eric's archenemy
- Lauri: A magician who is Eric's second archenemy

== Publication history ==
In total about 67 Eric stories were published between 1946 and 1964. All of them were drawn in the text comic format, which was the dominant comic strip genre in the Netherlands until deep into the 1950s. Some stories of Eric have been published with text balloons for publication too. Since the 1970s publishing company Panda has republished all stories chronologically and integrally. Historian Rob van Eijck, a fan of the series, wrote the introductions to these volumes.

From 1966 to 1974 Kresse drew a spin-off series, Erwin de Noorman, about Eric's son Erwin. These stories were published with text balloons.

== Translations ==
Eric de Noorman was translated in several languages.

- Danish: Erik Vidfare (published in the magazine Kong Kylie )
- English: Eric the Norseman
- French: Eric, l'Homme du Nord (Belgium), Eric le Brave (France) (published in the Walloon newspaper Le Soir and the French monthly magazine Aventures Boum, Vécu and Pierrot Champion)
- German: Erik, der Wikinger (published in Boni Bilderpost)
- Portuguese: Erico, Homem do Norte
- Spanish Erik, El Hombre del Norte
- Swedish: Erik Vidfare (published in the magazines Vecko Nytt and Året Runt)

== Adaptations ==
In 1949 Riny Blaaser adapted the comic strip into a play.

== In popular culture ==
Eric de Noorman was first published in the Flemish newspaper Het Laatste Nieuws. Their youth magazine Pum-Pum (1951-1967) was named after the eponymous midget character in the series.

Willy Vandersteen was a fan of the series and used it as an inspiration to his own realistically drawn adventure stories, such as De Rode Ridder. Dutch comics artist Dick Matena also sees Kresse as a personal hero and published a homage to Eric de Noorman, titled Mijmeringen bij een mythe. He also once drew a parody of the series for Playboy

In 2006, to celebrate the 60th anniversary of the comic, twenty large drawings were attached to the walls of several buildings in Arnhem
