= On Second Avenue =

- Music: Various
- Lyrics: Various
- Book: Various
- Productions: 1987 Off-Broadway; 2005 Off-Broadway

On Second Avenue is a Yiddish American musical theatre production which looks back at the heyday of Yiddish Theater, especially in the Yiddish Theater District in Manhattan's East Village on Second Avenue.

The original 1987 production opened at the Norman Thomas Theater on the Lower East Side, and a revival produced in 2005 by the Folksbiene opened on the Upper West Side. Both productions were off-Broadway. The revue was put together by Zalmen Mlotek and Moishe Rosenfeld as a sequence of skits, and songs with dialogue in English and songs in Yiddish. The revue features songs from Yiddish theatre greats like Abraham Goldfaden. The original cast was led by Mary Soreanu and the revival cast by Mike Burstyn to critical acclaim. The revival was nominated for two Drama Desk Awards for 2005 - Best Revival for Folksbiene, and Outstanding Actor for Mike Burstyn.

Two Yiddish music albums by the same name were released by Jan Peerce in 1964 (the album is actually called On 2nd Avenue), and by the Hester Street Troupe - but they have no relation to the show.

== Reviews ==
- Original cast review in New York Times
- Revival cast review in New York Times
