= Pesach Burstein =

Polish-born American comedian, singer, coupletist and director

- Burstein and his wife Lillian Lux
- Born: April 15, 1896; Pułtusk, Congress Poland, Russian Empire (now Poland)
- Died: April 6, 1986 (aged 89); United States

Pesach "Peishachke" Burstein (April 15, 1896 – April 6, 1986) was a Polish-born American comedian, singer, coupletist, and director of Yiddish vaudeville/theater. He was honored with the Itzik Manger Prize in 1986. His wife Lillian Lux, and son Mike Burstyn are also actors.

== Early years ==
Born in Pułtusk, then in Congress Poland, in the Russian Empire (today, in Poland), Burstein was called Pesach-ke due to his birth on Passover. In 1901 he moved with his family to Berdiansk (Ukraine), where his father ran a clothing store. He ran away from home as a teenager to join a traveling Yiddish theatrical troupe. He was arrested as a spy by Russians during World War I. He never again saw his parents, who were beaten and killed in a robbery in Minsk, as they were traveling back to Poland in 1921.

== United States ==
Brought to the United States in 1923 by Boris Thomashefsky and signed to a 20-year recording contract by Columbia Records, he is well-remembered for singing "Odessa Mama" and the Yiddish version of "Sonny Boy". There is a common myth that this recording was made same day, in the same studio and with the same orchestra that Jolson had just used, but the Burstein waxing was made some time after the million-selling Jolson recording. In addition, Jolson was an exclusive Brunswick artist, whilst Burstein recorded for Columbia, on its Green Label ethnic series. Jolson was accompanied by the Brunswick studio orchestra, under the direction of Gus Haenschen. The (considerably smaller) studio orchestra accompanying Burstein was probably a sub-group of the National Theater pit orchestra, under the baton of Joseph Rumshinsky. An impressive stage whistler and actor-director of the popular A Khasene in Shtetl (A Wedding in the Village) act with his entire family.

He married twice, secondly to Lillian Lux, 22 years his junior. In 1939, the couple was touring Poland. Since there was unrest at the time, a member of the diplomatic corps suggested the Bursteins take the summer off from performances; they left for the United States just days before the German invasion. The troupe was sponsored by Boris Thomashefsky to play on the Lower East Side Yiddish theatres in the Yiddish Theater District on Manhattan's Second Avenue.

Pesach and Lillian Burstein had twins, Michael and Susan (b. 1945). Michael Burstein became an actor, known professionally as Mike Burstyn. When the twins turned 7, they began performing in The Komediant, A Khasene in Shtetl (A Wedding in the Village) and other Yiddish-language productions all over the world, although Susan did not remain in the acting business. The family also performed at resorts in the Catskills, in Sullivan County, New York, a resort circuit colloquially known as the "Borscht Belt". He toured extensively through Eastern Europe before World War II. Pesach Burstein opened his own theater ("The Hopkinson") in Brooklyn. His troupe (advertised as the Four Bursteins, the twins appearing under the stage names Motele and Zisele) won critical acclaim in Israel and on Broadway for performing Itzik Manger's Megille Lider, the longest running Yiddish production to date in Israel, released on Broadway as Megilla of Itzik Manger.

After the Holocaust, due to a drastic reduction in the size of the Yiddish audience, he was instrumental in finding out diasporic communities as far afield as South America, and Eastern Europe, as well as Israel. He initially settled in Israel but later left due to the state tax levied on Yiddish theater for promotion of the Hebrew language, and problems with authorities.

== Later years ==
Pesach Burstein performed a small role in the Israel Becker-directed movie Shnei Kuni Leml, starring his son. On the 100th anniversary of his birth, director Arnon Goldfinger directed a documentary film about the lives and careers of the Burstein family – The Komediant (the title a reference both to Burstein's career in general and to the name of one of his shows).

== Autobiography ==
His autobiography, What a Life!, was co-authored with his wife in Yiddish (Geshpilt a Lebn, 1980) and later translated into English.

== Death ==
Pesach means Passover in Yiddish, and Pesach-ke Burstein was so named because he was born on the day of Passover in 1896; he died a few hours before Passover in 1986, a week and two days short of his 90th birthday. He was interred in the Yiddish Theater section (Block 67) of the Mount Hebron Cemetery.
