= Mike Burstyn =

American actor

- מייק בורשטיין
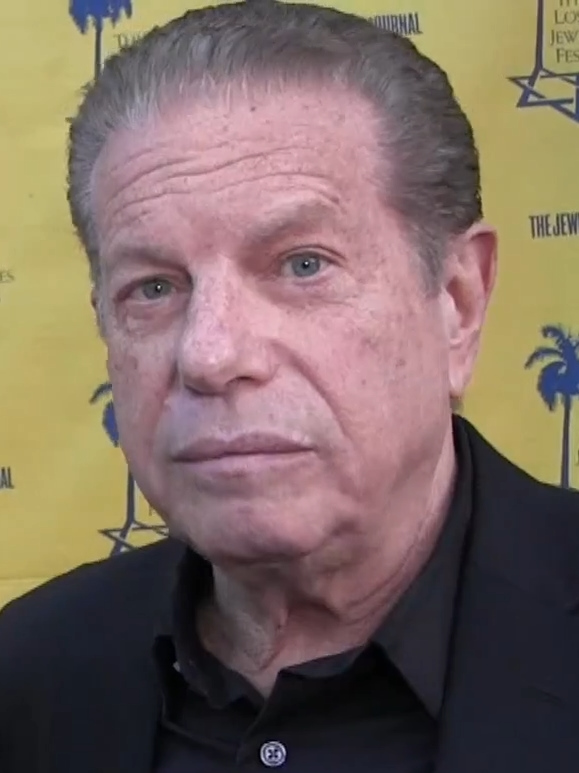
- Burstyn at the 2017 Los Angeles Jewish Film Festival
- Born: Michael Burstein; July 1, 1945 (age 81); New York City, New York, U.S.
- Occupations: American-Israeli film, stage, television, actor

Michael Burstein (Hebrew: מייק בורשטיין; born July 1, 1945) is an Israeli-American actor known onstage as Mike Burstyn. He was born in New York City to the late Yiddish-language actors, Pesach Burstein and Lillian Lux. His first cousin was Borsch Belt comedian, Jay Lester. Mike began performing on stage at Yiddish theaters from childhood, in musicals and melodramas produced by his father, Pesach Burstein, especially as part of the Four Bursteins. (Mike and his twin sister were billed as Motele and Zisele) in standard Pesach Burstein productions like A Khasene in Shtetl (A Wedding in the Village). He headed out on his own after reaching adulthood, in a bid to reach audiences bigger than the Yiddish stage.

He has performed on television in the United States, Israel, and the Netherlands. He has performed on Broadway, the Yiddish theater, and on the Israeli stage. He had his own show, De Mike Burstyn Show (1978–1981). He was cast as the lead in the major Israeli films Shabbat HaMalka in 1965 as well as The Flying Matchmaker in 1966. In 1981, he took part in the Israeli heats of the Eurovision Song Contest with the song "Sviv kol ha'olam". The song was placed sixth.

Among his most noted roles in Yiddish theater was the part in his father's production of Itzik Manger's Songs of the Megillah (the longest running Yiddish production to date in Israel, released on Broadway as Megilla of Itzik Manger).

Burstyn starred on Broadway in Barnum, where he succeeded Jim Dale in the title role. He was nominated for Drama Desk Awards for his performance as Mayer in The Rothschilds off-Broadway in 1990 and in On Second Avenue in 2005. He portrayed Roy Cohn in the 1970 Broadway drama Inquest and starred as Mike Todd in the Broadway musical Ain't Broadway Grand in 1993. In 2009, he starred in the title role of the stage adaption of Joseph Bologna's Lansky.

He has been a Dubbing Director for Netflix since 2020.

In 2017 he wrote and directed his award winning feature film, Azimuth commemorating the 50th anniversary of the Six Day War. Available on Amazon Prime.

== Personal life ==
Burstyn holds dual Israeli-American citizenship. The Komediant is a documentary recounting the lives and careers of the Burstein family.
