= Arnon Goldfinger =

Israeli film director and scriptwriter

- ארנון גולדפינגר
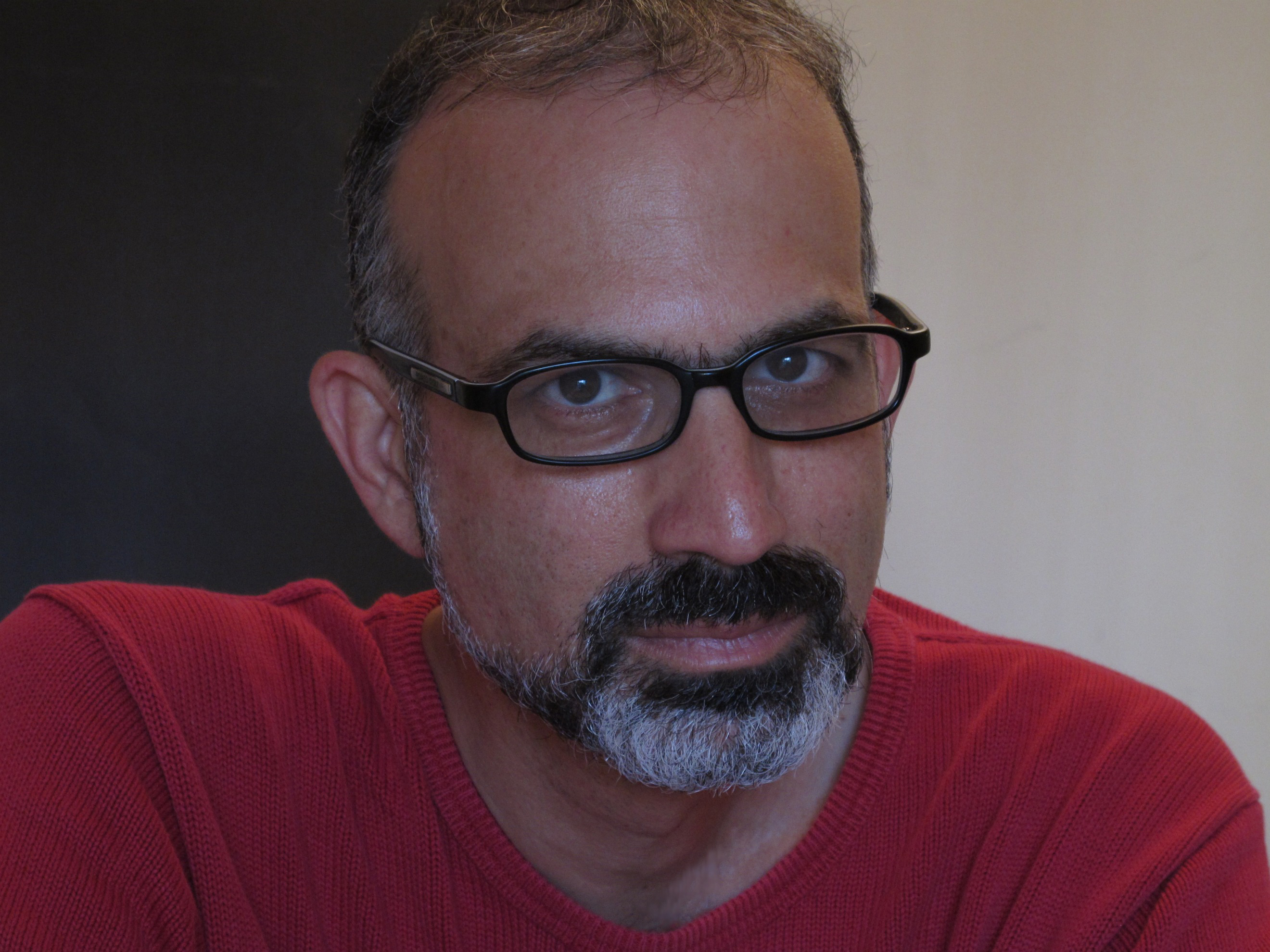
- Born: 1963 (age 62–63); Ramat Gan, Israel
- Occupations: Teacher, film director
- Notable work: The Komediant; The Flat

Arnon Goldfinger (Hebrew: ארנון גולדפינגר; born 1963) is an Israeli film director and scriptwriter, winner of two Israeli Academy Awards, known for his films The Komediant and The Flat.

== Early life ==
Arnon Goldfinger was born in Ramat Gan, Israel, to parents who immigrated from Germany and Czechoslovakia. As a youth he spent many hours sitting at the chess board, eventually becoming one of the most exceptional young chess players in Israel. He attended Tel Aviv University where he majored in cinema with a minor in philosophy. He completed his studies with honors and in 1987 was chosen as the outstanding student in the faculty of the arts and was granted the Rector's Scholarship.

In 1990 he became the director of the Third International Student Film Festival in Tel Aviv. In the summer of 1990 Goldfinger was selected, as one of 12 students from around Europe, to take part in the European summer film school in Belgrade with renowned Polish filmmaker Krzysztof Zanussi as the lead instructor.

== Teaching career ==
Upon graduation he began teaching, directing and scriptwriting at the leading film schools in Israel including the Sam Spiegel Film School, Maaleh, Camera Obscura and the film department at Tel Aviv University where he teaches till this day.

== Directing career ==
Arnon Goldfinger's first full-length film was released in 1999. The Komediant is a documentary about the Burstein family – Yiddish vaudeville artists – Mike Burstein (stage name Mike Burstyn), his parents and twin sister – and touches on the history of Yiddish theater. Goldfinger worked on this film for four years and in May 2000 the film was released theatrically in Israel, becoming the first documentary film in years that was commercially released.

The film was widely acclaimed and Goldfinger was chosen by the mainstream daily Yedioth Ahronoth as one of the top five people in cinema that year. In 2002 "The Komediant" was theatrically released in the US. It was distributed by New Yorker Films and screened at over 50 cinemas nationwide, including Lincoln Plaza in New York City and at dozens of film festivals. The Chicago Film Critics dubbed the film one of the year's top five documentaries.

In 2011 Goldfinger's second full-length film was released. The Flat is an Israeli- German coproduction whose German partner is the production company Zero One Film. The film opens with the director and members of his family gathered in his grandmother's apartment shortly after her death, in order to clear out the contents. There Goldfinger soon finds various items that reveal an astonishing chapter in the family's history, one that had been kept under wraps for decades, namely the co-operation between his Tuchler grandparents and the SS officer Leopold von Mildenstein in the cause of Zionism.

"The Flat" had its premiere at the 2011 Jerusalem Film Festival. In his review, critic Avner Shavit calls the film "one of the best Israeli documentary films of all time" and added "the audience at the screening yesterday experienced a sort of state of shock from the experience". In September 2011 "The Flat" was theatrically released in Israel where it has been receiving rave reviews. Time Out Tel Aviv placed the film at the top of its recommended list for more than 30 weeks under the headline: "not to be missed". The publication also chose the film as one of the 25 most significant works of art for the year 2011. The Flat was commercially released in Germany in June 2012 and in the US in October 2012. The film won many film awards including the Israeli Film Academy Award for Best Documentary ("Ophir") 2011 and was among the three final nominees for the German Film Academy Award for Best Documentary ("Lola") 2013 and among the final nominees for the German TV Grimme Award 2014.

== Filmography ==
- The Benny Zinger Show (1993, short film, written and directed)
- Schindler's children (1993, Short TV documentary, written and directed)
- Antonnela in the holy land (1994, TV documentary, written and directed)
- Anne's Way (1995, TV documentary, written and directed)
- The Komediant (1999, directed and co-produced)
- The Flat (2011, written, directed and co-produced)
- A tale beginning in three rooms (2023, Short documentary, written and directed)

== Awards ==
- Moograbi Award – Third Best Film, – The Benny Zinger Show (1993)
- Chicago International Film Festival – Certificate of Merit – The Benny Zinger Show (1993)
- Israeli Academy Award – Best Documentary – The Komediant (1999)
- Haifa International Film Festival – Best Documentary – The Komediant (1999)
- Doc Aviv – Best editing – The Komediant (1999)
- Jerusalem Film Festival – Best director of a full-length documentary – The Flat
- Israeli Academy Award ("ophir") – Best Documentary – The Flat
- Israeli documentary filmmakers Forum – Best Film – The Flat
- Israeli documentary filmmakers Forum – Best Director – The Flat
- Israeli documentary filmmakers Forum – Best research – The Flat
- Bavarian Film Award – Best Documentary – The Flat
