= The Komediant (show) =

Yiddish theatre act

The Komediant was a Yiddish theater act produced by the Pesach Burstein troupe. A documentary The Komediant by the same name chronicles the lives of the Burstein family.
