= Mount Hebron Cemetery (New York City) =

Cemetery in Flushing, Queens, New York City

Coordinates: 40°44′03″N 73°49′50″W

- Mount Hebron Cemetery, Queens, N.Y.
- Interactive map of Mount Hebron Cemetery

Details
- Established: 1909
- Location: Flushing, New York
- Country: US
- Type: Jewish
- Owned by: Cedar Grove Cemetery Association
- Size: 250 acres (1.0 km^{2})
- No. of graves: more than 220,000
- Website: Mount Hebron Cemetery

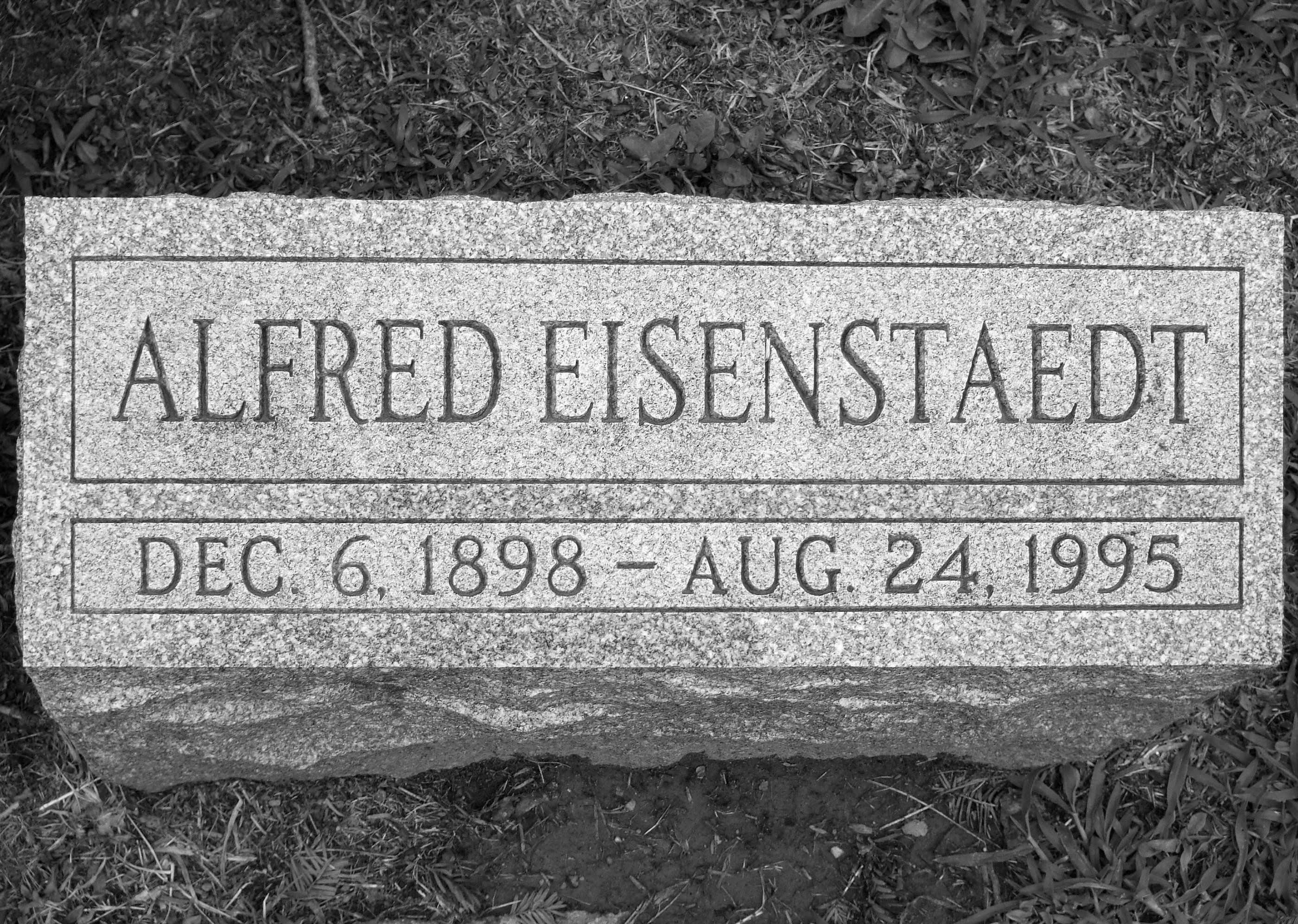
Alfred Eisenstaedt

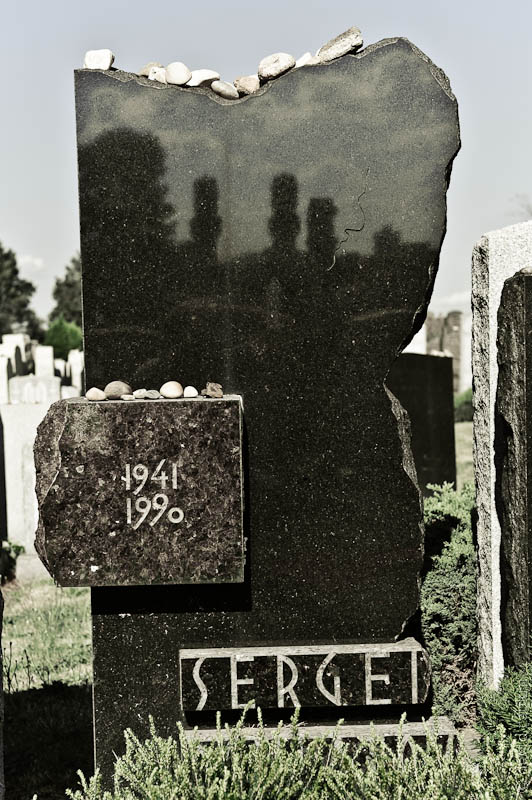
Sergei Dovlatov

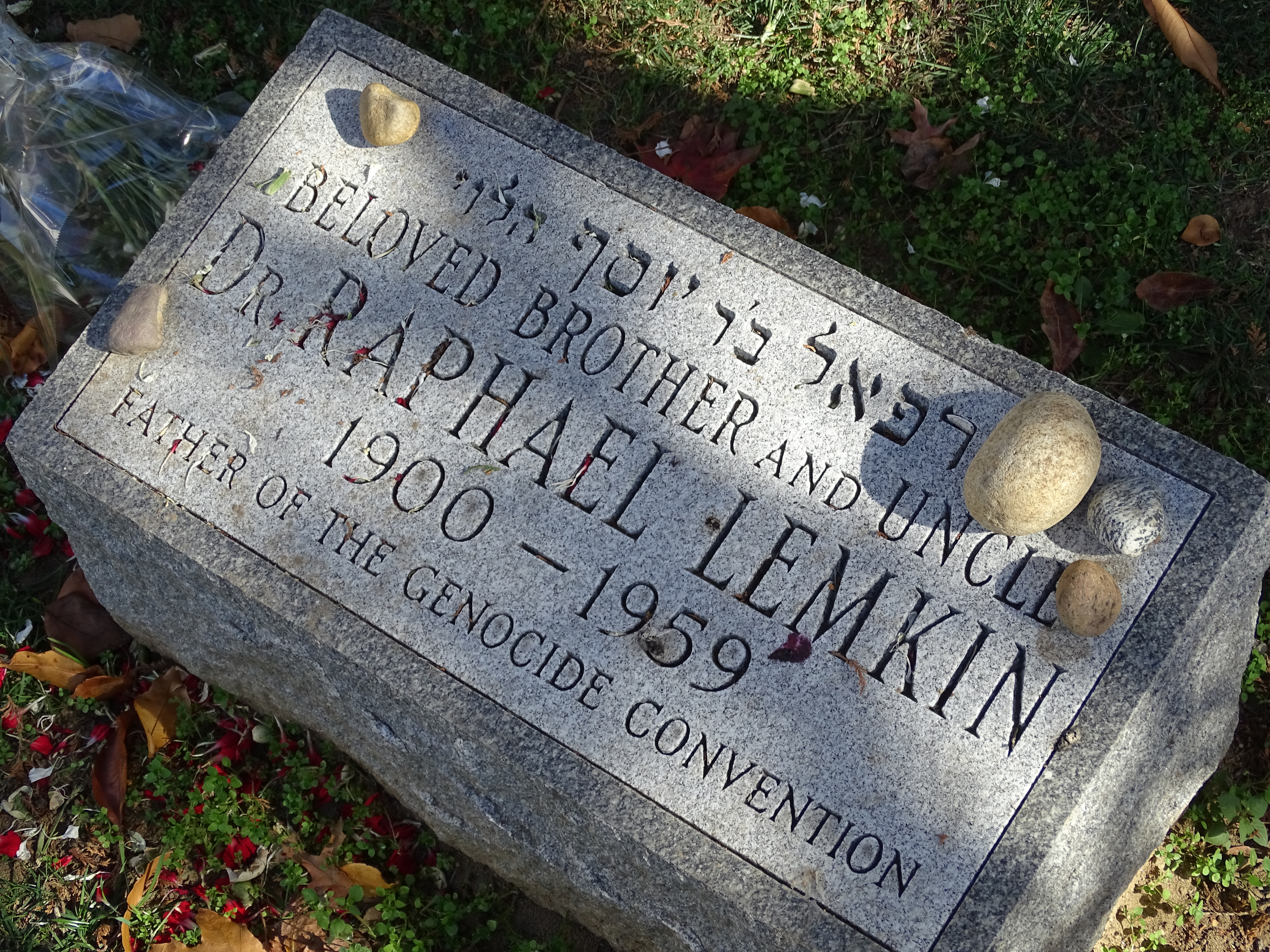
Raphael Lemkin

Mount Hebron is a Jewish cemetery located in Flushing, Queens, New York, United States. It was founded in 1903 as the Jewish section of Cedar Grove Cemetery, and occupies the vast majority of the grounds at Cedar Grove. The cemetery is on the former Spring Hill estate of colonial governor Cadwallader Colden. Mount Hebron is arranged in blocks, which are then split up into sections or society grounds. Sections were originally sold mainly to families or Jewish community groups such as landsmanshaftn, mutual aid societies, and burial societies. For instance, Mount Hebron is known for having a section reserved for people who worked in New York City's Yiddish theater industry. While this type of organization is common for American Jewish cemeteries, Mount Hebron has an especially diverse range of society grounds. About 226,000 people have been buried in Mount Hebron since it opened.

There is a large Workmen's Circle section in both Cedar Grove and Mount Hebron Cemetery, with about 12,000 burials of Jewish and non-Jewish members of the Workmen's Circle.

Mount Hebron also hosts a number of Holocaust memorials erected on society grounds by Jewish immigrants. For instance, there is a large monument erected by immigrants and descendants of immigrants from the city of Grodno in what is today western Belarus. The monument is dedicated "In memoriam to our dear parents, brothers and sisters of the city of Grodno and environs who were brutally persecuted and slain by the Nazis during World War II."

== Notable burials ==
- Celia Adler (1889–1979), Yiddish theater actress
- Henrietta Jacobson Adler (1906–1988), Yiddish theater actress
- Julius Adler (1906–1994), Yiddish theater actor
- Jules Bender (1914–1982), college basketball star
- Mina Bern (1911–2010), Yiddish theater actress
- Ben Bernie (1891–1943), bandleader and radio personality
- Reizl Bozyk (1914–1993), Yiddish theater actress
- Paulina Lavitz Brav (1879–1959), Yiddish theater actress
- Louis Buchalter (1897–1944), organized crime figure, boss of Murder, Inc.
- Lillian Lux Burstein (1918–2005), Yiddish theater actress
- Pesach'ke Burstein (1896–1986), Yiddish theater actor
- Louis Cohen (1904–1939), mobster
- Isidore Dollinger (1903–2000), New York State Senator and Assemblyman, U.S. Congressman, and Bronx County District Attorney
- Sergei Dovlatov (1941–1990), writer
- Alfred Eisenstaedt (1898–1995), photojournalist
- Shep Fields (1910–1981), bandleader
- Louis D. Gibbs (1880–1929), lawyer, assemblyman, Bronx County Court judge, New York Supreme Court Justice
- Jack Gilford (1908–1990) Broadway, film and television performer
- Madeline Lee Gilford (1923–2008), film and stage actress, theatrical producer, wife of Jack Gilford
- Jennie Goldstein (1896–1960), Yiddish theater actress
- Adolph Held (1885–1969), New York City alderman, Forward editor and manager, labor activist
- Max Jacobson (1900–1979), physician often known as Dr. Feelgood
- Marvin Kaplan (1927–2016), actor
- Nathan Kaplan (1891–1923), gangster
- Alan King (1927–2004), comedian
- Harry Kopp (1880–1943), lawyer and politician
- Abraham Landau (1895–1935), mobster
- Eddie Layton (1925–2004), organist for the New York Yankees
- Aaron Lebedeff (1873–1960), Yiddish theater actor
- Fred Lebow (1932–1994), founder the New York City Marathon and president of the New York Road Runners Club
- Raphael Lemkin (1900–1959), initiator of the Genocide Convention
- Shifra Lerer (1915–2011), Yiddish theater actress
- Jeanne Manford (1920–2013), American teacher and LGBTQ+ activist
- Menashe Oppenheim (1905–1973), Yiddish theater and film actor
- Sam Paul (1874–1927), gambler, underworld figure, businessman, and political organizer
- Jack Pearl (1894–1982), vaudeville performer and radio comedian
- Nathan D. Perlman (1887–1952), U.S. congressman
- Molly Picon Kalich (1898–1992), Yiddish theater actress
- Gregory Ratoff (1893–1960), Yiddish theater and Hollywood actor and director
- Morris D. Reiss (c. 1887–1949), lawyer and member of the New York State Assembly
- Florika Remetier (1946-1979), Romanian-American musician and socialist feminist activist
- Miriam Kressyn Rexite (1910–1996), Yiddish theater actress and singer
- Seymour Rexite (1908–2002), Yiddish theater actor and singer
- Solomon Schechter (1847–1915), Conservative Jewish theologian
- Fred Schmertz (1888–1976), founder member of the Millrose Games and the meet director from 1934 to 1974
- Maurice Schwartz (1891–1960), Yiddish theater actor
- Ben Selvin (1898–1980), jazz musician
- William I. Sirovich (1882–1939), U.S. congressman
- Menasha Skulnik (1892–1970), Yiddish theater actor
- Bertha Kalich Spachner (1874–1939), Yiddish theater actress
- Fred Spira (1924–2007), photo industry executive, inventor, art and photography collector, historian
- Thea Tewi (1902–1999), sculptor and lingerie designer
- Bessie Thomashefsky (1873–1962), Yiddish theater actress
- Boris Thomashevsky (1866–1939), Yiddish theater actor
- Emanuel Weiss (1906–1944), organized crime figure, member of Murder, Inc., and associate of Louis Buchalter
- Peter Wiernik (1865–1936), Yiddish journalist, newspaper editor, historian
- One British Commonwealth war grave, of a private of the Royal Canadian Army Medical Corps of World War I
