= Aaron Lebedeff =

Yiddish theatre actor

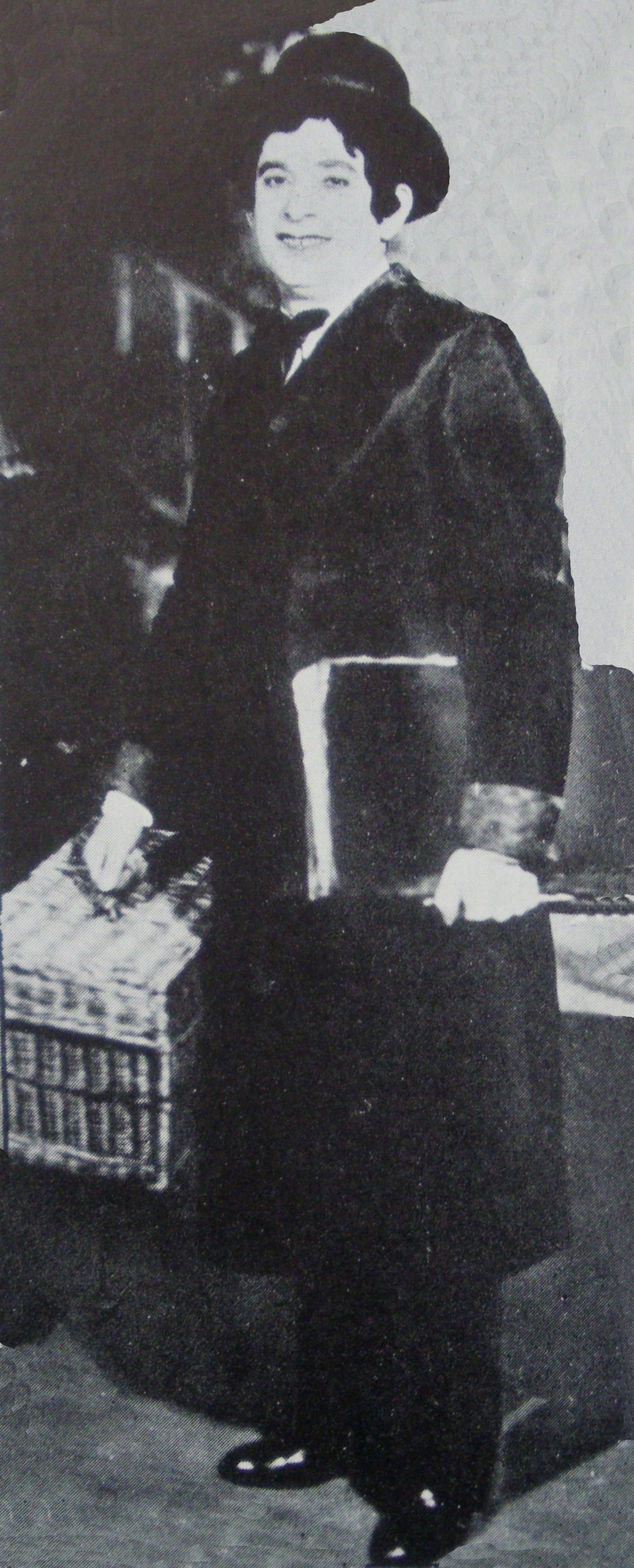
Aaron Lebedeff in Der Yidisher Yankee

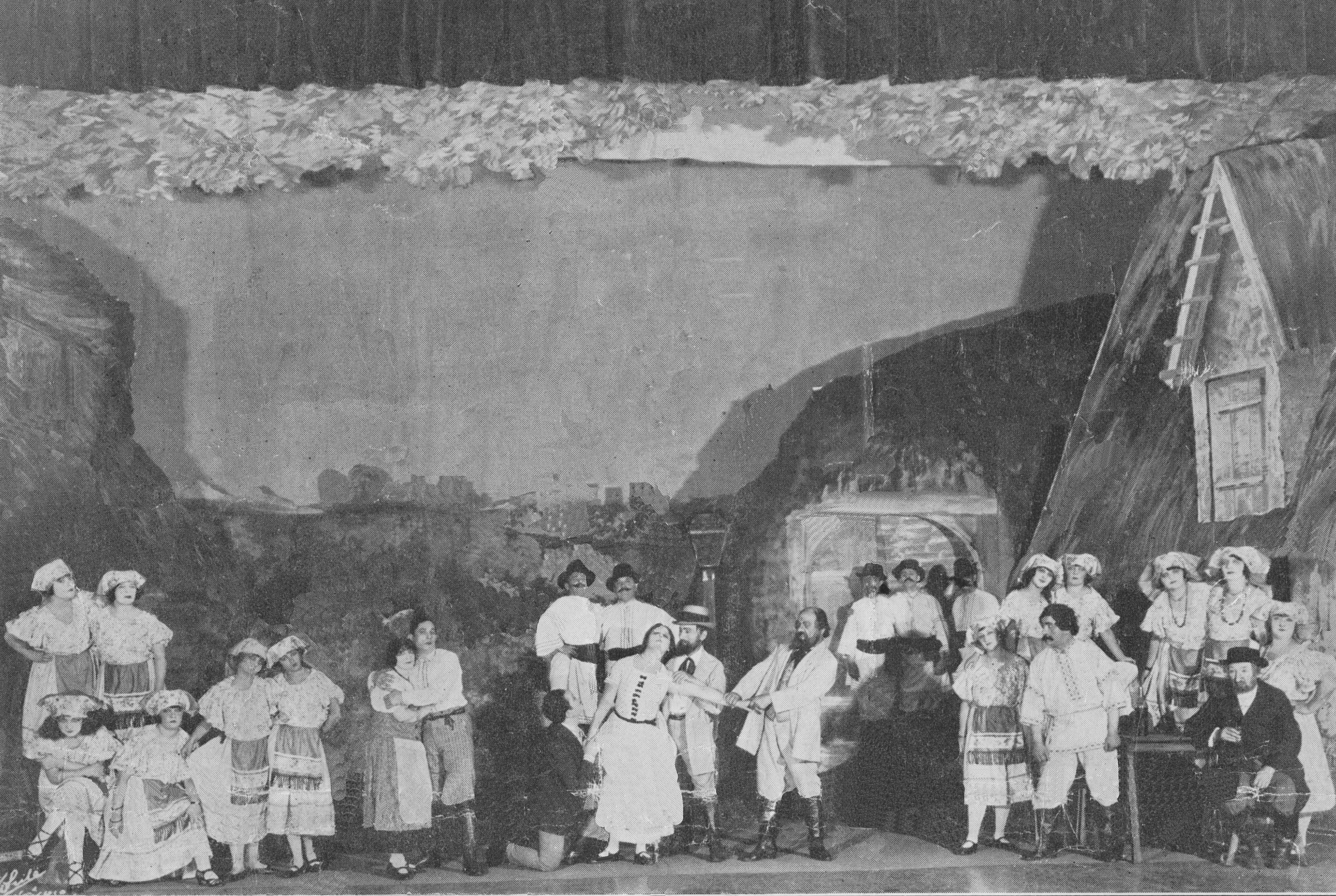
Yiddish operetta Roumanian wedding (Di rumenishe khasene) with Charles Nathanson, Solomon Greenberg, Zina Goldstein, Aaron Lebedeff, Bessie Weissman, Samuel Rosenstein, Abe Sincoff, Saltche Shor, Herman Seratzky, Emanual Teplitzky, music Peretz Sandler, Play by Moyshe Shorr

Aaron Lebedeff (1873–1960) was a Yiddish theatre star, born in Gomel, Belarus.

== Life and career ==
In childhood he sang for the Hazzan, Borekh David. Having no interest in education, he was sent to learn a trade, but soon he ran away and began to play small roles in a Russian theaters in Bobruysk, Minsk and other towns. When the Russian troupe fell apart, he went back to Homel, taking part in amateur theatre and opening a dance club. When Leyzer Bernshtein's troupe arrived, he wheedled a place in it.

He was officially a chorister, unofficially a roadie/stage hand (pekl-treger). He dressed the actors and was a prompter. He finally debuted in Der Pipkiner rav and became the character actor he would remain, playing in different wandering theatre troupes across Russia. He was hired in Warsaw and became popular there as Der Litvisher Komiker (The Litvak comic). In 1912–13, he played in Łódź with Zandberg, then back to Warsaw; and at the outbreak of World War I, he was pressed into the Russian army and sent to Harbin, Manchuria, (1916), where he spent his time of military service giving concerts for the officers.

After being demobilized, he worked in Avrom Fishzohn's troupe; but in order to support himself, he often had to sing in Russian or English for the American Red Cross.

He married Vera Lubow and later wandered toward Japan with his wife, presenting "International Concerts" (also in China). In 1920, he and his wife left for America and were hired for Boris Thomashevsky's National Theater production of Wolf Shumsky's Lyavke Molodyetz. He was such a hit that he became an overnight star of Yiddish theater in America.

Aaron died on November 8, 1960, and was buried next to his wife (who died two years prior) in the Yiddish Theatrical Alliance section of Mount Hebron Cemetery in Queens, NY.

== Lebedeff's musicals ==
Here are most of the shows he starred in during the 1920s:

- Khatskele kol-boynik (Yehude Boymvol)
- Di sheyne Berta (Julius Adler)
- Shloymke oyf Brodvey and Yoshke Khvat (Yitskhok Lesh) (music Herman Wohl)
- Lebedik un Freylekh (Lively and Happy) (music Herman Wohl)
- Arontshik un Solomontshik (Harry Kalmanovitsh, music Herman Wohl)
- Toyznt un eyn nakht (1001 nights) (Boris Thomashevsky, music Herman Wohl)
- Tanz, gezang un veyn (Dance, Sing and Cry) (music Joseph Chernyavsky)
- Yankele Litvak (Israel Rosenberg, L. and S. Rozenstein)
- Di Rumenishe Khasene (Rumanian wedding), (Moyse Shor, music Perez Sandler)
- Dem tatn's zindele (The Father's Little Son) (Kalmanovitsh, music Perets Sandler)
- Mendl in Japan (Rakov, music Peretz Sandler)
- Kavkazer libe (Israel Rosenberg, music Peretz Sandler)
- A khasene in Palestine (Rosenberg - Sandler)
- Modeln fun libe (L. Freeman - Sandler)
- Volodke in Odessa (Lesh - Sandler)
- Syomke vert a khosn (Freyman - Sandler)
- Der kleyner milioner (The little millionaire) (Aaron Nager - Sholom Secunda)
- A nakht in Kalifornia (William Siegel - music Alexander Olshanetsky)
- A gan-eydn far tsvey (Paradise For Two) (William Siegel - Olshanetsky)
- Itzikl Sholtik (Isidore Lesh, music Olshanetsky)
- Goldene teg (Siegel - Olshanetsky)
- Der litvisher yankee (Yitskhok Lesh - Olshanetsky)
- Hulye Kabtsn (Israel Rosenberg - Olshanetsky)
- Motke fun Slobodke (Kalmanovitsh)

In the 1930s:

- A Khasene in shtetl (William Siegel, music Herman Wohl)
- Rusishe Libe (Russian love) (Yitskhok Lesh - Wohl)
- A nakht in vald (A night in the woods) (Siegel - Wohl)
- Di gliklekhe nakht (The lucky night) (Siegel - Wohl)
- Der groyser nes (The great miracle) (Avrom Blum - Wohl)
- Raykhe kabtsonim (Rich paupers) (Siegel - Wohl)
- Der groyser suprayz (The big surprise) (Blum - Wohl)

In his traveling troupes, he also presented:

- Max and Abraham Goldfaden's Beyde Kuni Lemel
- Di bobe Yakhne (Goldfaden)
- Der vilder mentsh (The wild man) (Jacob Mikhailovich Gordin)
- Morgen (Chone Gottesfeld)

Lebedeff was a coupletist, composing dozens of comic songs for the Broadway Record Company; he recorded hundreds of sides including the famous Rumania, Rumania and Vot ken yu makh, s'iz amerike!.
