= Jennie Goldstein =

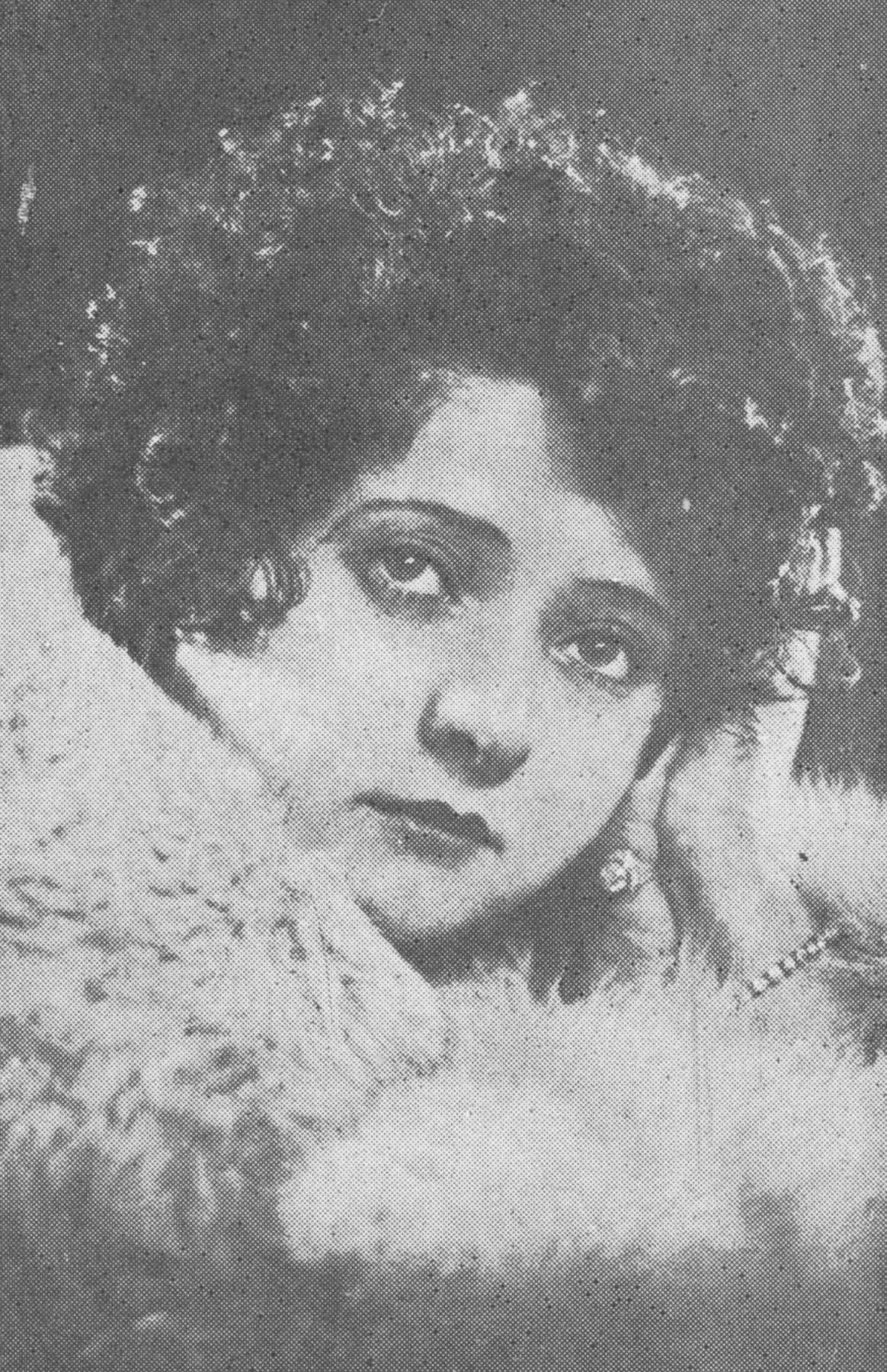
- Born: May 8, 1894; Manhattan, New York City, New York, U.S.
- Died: February 9, 1960 (aged 65); New York City, U.S.
- Resting place: Mount Hebron Cemetery
- Occupations: Actress, singer, songwriter
- Years active: 1902–1960
- Spouses: Max Gabel (m. 1912; div. 1930) Charles W. Groll (m. 1936)

Jennie Goldstein (Yiddish: דזשעני גאָלדשטיין; May 8, 1894 – February 9, 1960) was a Jewish American theater actress and singer.

== Early life ==
Goldstein was born in New York; her father was a butcher. When she was 6, actress Rosa Margulies noticed her pretty voice and drew her into child roles at the Windsor Theater, including Hanele di neytorin (Hannah the seamstress) with Bertha Kalich. Having made a good impression, Jennie was soon making $9 a week.

She went to Kenny Liptsin in the Thalia Theater and played in Jacob Mikhailovich Gordin's טהרת המשפחה Family Purity—for which Sigmund Mogulesko wrote her the song Oyf yener zayt (On the other side)—and Der umbakanter (The stranger).

At the age of 13 she began to play adult roles for Max R. Veyner, her first being Yoysef Lateyner's Dos Yidishe harts (the Jewish heart). She moved to Clinton Street Vaudeville in 1909. She met Max Gabel (Gebil) there and married him when she was sixteen years old. Gebel wrote melodramas in which the couple starred, including Alts far libe (Everything for love) and Kol shofar (voice of the shofar), specially written for her. The shows were popular and the couple played in Winnipeg and then in the Lipson Theater and the Grand Music Hall and Peoples Theater where she and Gebil were co-directors.

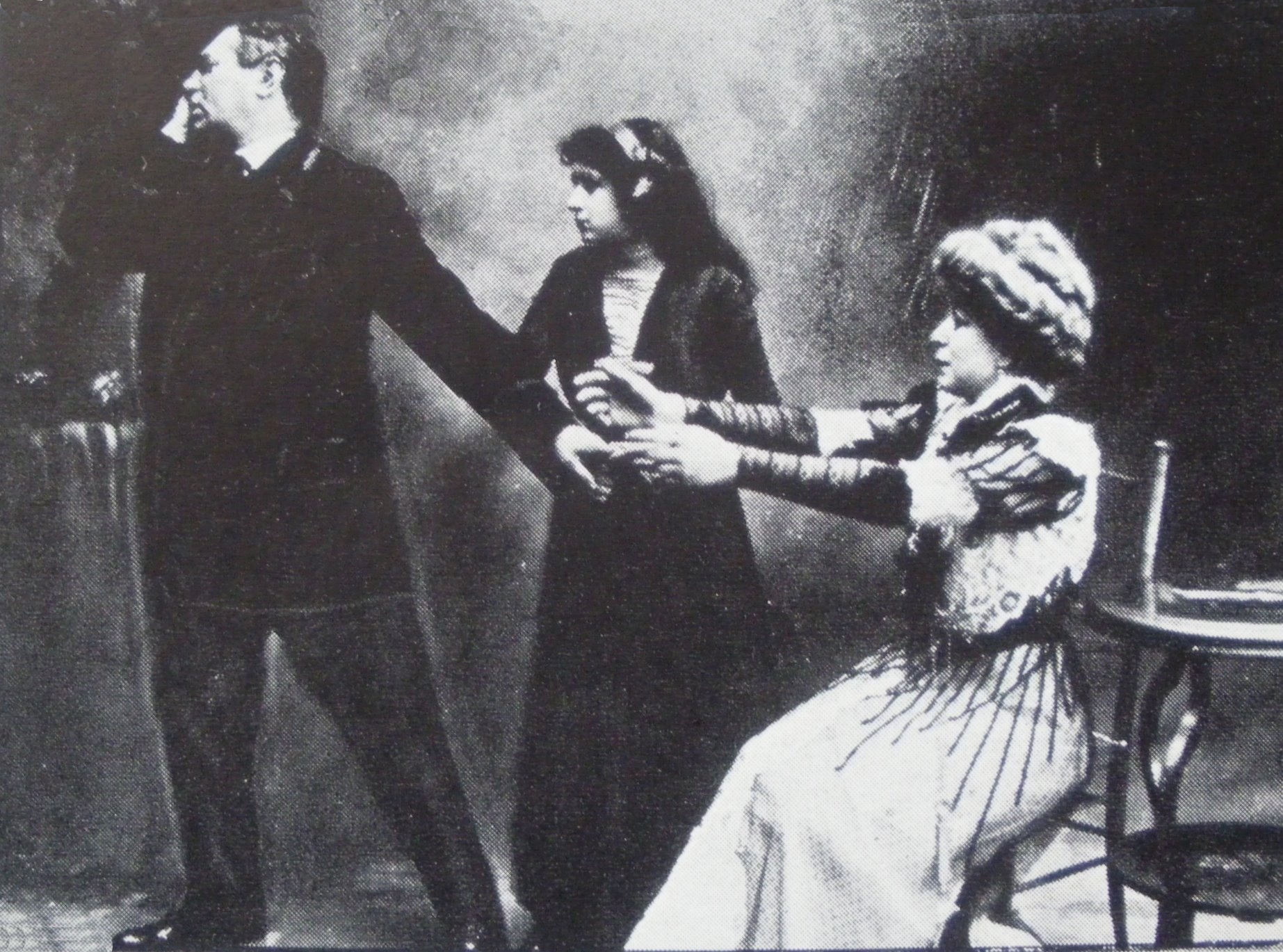
David Kessler, Jennie Goldstein, and Malvina Lobel in Joseph Lateiner's The Jewish Heart.

In 1924, she toured in London and the American provinces. She wrote lyrics for some of her songs, recording them for radio and phonograph recordings.

Goldstein and Gabel divorced in 1930; she subsequently managed the Prospect Theater in the Bronx in 1932–1933. She married lawyer Charles W. Groll in May 1936. She starred in her only film role, Tsvey shvester (Two Sisters) in 1939.

== Later career ==
Goldstein was known for playing unhappy heroines and, later, their mothers:

There was the tragedienne Jennie Goldstein wringing her heart and wracking her sob-filled voice as she repeated the travails of the innocent immigrant girl seduced by the villainies of the cruel and heartless New York sweatshop world.

However, during the 1940s, after deciding that audiences had had enough to cry about because of World War II, she became a comedian. She played at Jewish organizational functions, performed in two Broadway shows in the 1950s, and appeared on television. Goldstein died in New York City on February 9, 1960.

She was buried at Mount Hebron Cemetery in Flushing, Queens.
