= Donald Duck Weekblad =

Dutch weekly comics magazine

Donald Duck
- Cover of an issue, released in December 2024
- Editor-in-chief: Ferdi Felderhof
- Former editors: Joan Lommen (2013-2021); Thom Roep (1984–2013)
- Categories: Comics magazine
- Frequency: Weekly
- Circulation: 285.000 (2012)
- Publisher: DPG Media; Previously: De Geïllustreerde Pers; Sanoma; Oberon; VNU Uitgevers
- Founded: 1952
- First issue: 25 October 1952; 73 years ago
- Country: Netherlands
- Based in: Amsterdam
- Language: Dutch
- Website: donaldduck.nl
- ISSN: 0165-1293
- OCLC: 72727908

Donald Duck is the Dutch flagship weekly Disney comics magazine, first published on October 25, 1952.

The magazine was originally published by the staff of the women's magazine Margriet, and every Margriet subscriber received the first issue for free. The comic is mainly aimed at younger children, and includes a letters page from readers. In 2019, the magazine reached its 3,500th issue.

== Readership ==
A 2014 study by Nationaal Onderzoek Multimedia of comic book reading among Dutch children ages 6–12 during the past year, placed Donald Duck (81%) as most read comic book, and Donald Duck Extra (44%) as second place, before Kidsweek (33%), Nickelodeon Magazine (33%), Tina (25%) and National Geographic Junior (33%). In 2014 it was read by 1.6 million Dutch citizens above the age of 13, out of which 940.000 men and 660.000 women. In 2008, it was the most read magazine among Dutch students (10%).

== Media attention ==
In 2012, Dutch prime minister Mark Rutte appeared in Donald Duck. Rutte said that he was honored; he was a big fan during his youth. In 2013, Donald Duck became a museum guard and was chased down canals, in honor of the reopening of the Rijksmuseum and the 400 year anniversary of the Canals of Amsterdam.
