= National Theatre (Manhattan) =

Defunct Yiddish theater

Coordinates: 40°43′24.42″N 73°59′29.1″W

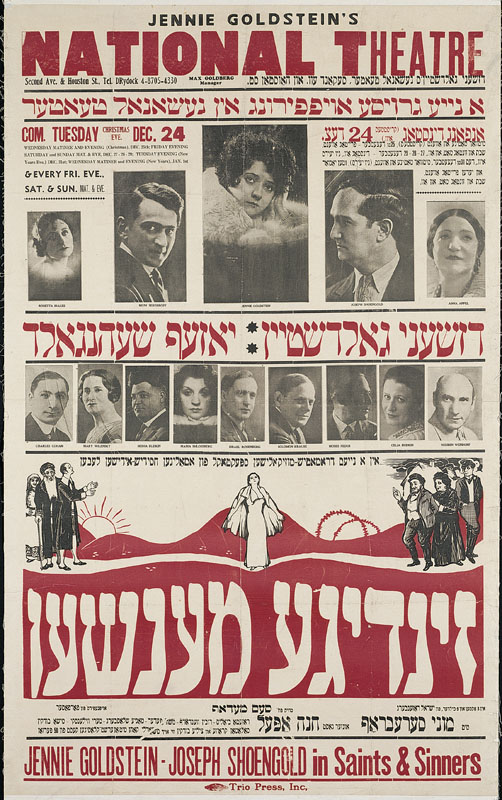
Yiddish theater poster for "Saints and Sinners" at Jennie Goldstein's National Theatre (1935)

The National Theatre was a Yiddish theater at the southwest corner of Chrystie Street and Houston Street in the Yiddish Theater District in Manhattan, New York City, United States. When first built it was leased to Boris Thomashefsky and Julius Adler. Its grand opening as the Adler-Thomashefsky National Theatre was on September 24, 1912.

The theater was one of the many designed by architect Thomas W. Lamb, and seated 1,900 when it opened. It was built as one of a pair of theaters, with the Crown Theater, seating 963, in the rooftop theater. Both theaters closed in 1941, re-opened in 1951 as a pair of cinemas (the National Theatre and the Roosevelt Theatre), and were demolished in 1959.
