= The Komediant (film) =

2000 film by Arnon Goldfinger

- Directed by: Arnon Goldfinger
- Written by: Oshra Schwartz
- Produced by: Amir Harel
- Cinematography: Yoram Millo
- Distributed by: Zebra Productions, Ltd
- Release date: 2000
- Running time: 85 minutes
- Country: Israel
- Languages: Yiddish; English

The Komediant is a 2000 Israeli documentary film directed by Arnon Goldfinger and written by Oshra Schwartz. It focuses on the life and careers of the Burstein family of Yiddish theatre: Pesach Burstein, his wife Lillian Lux, his son Mike Burstyn and daughter Susan Burstein-Roth. Made in honor of the 100th birth anniversary of Pesach Burstein, it received the Israeli Academy's Best Documentary Award.
