= Vera Rozanka =

American actress

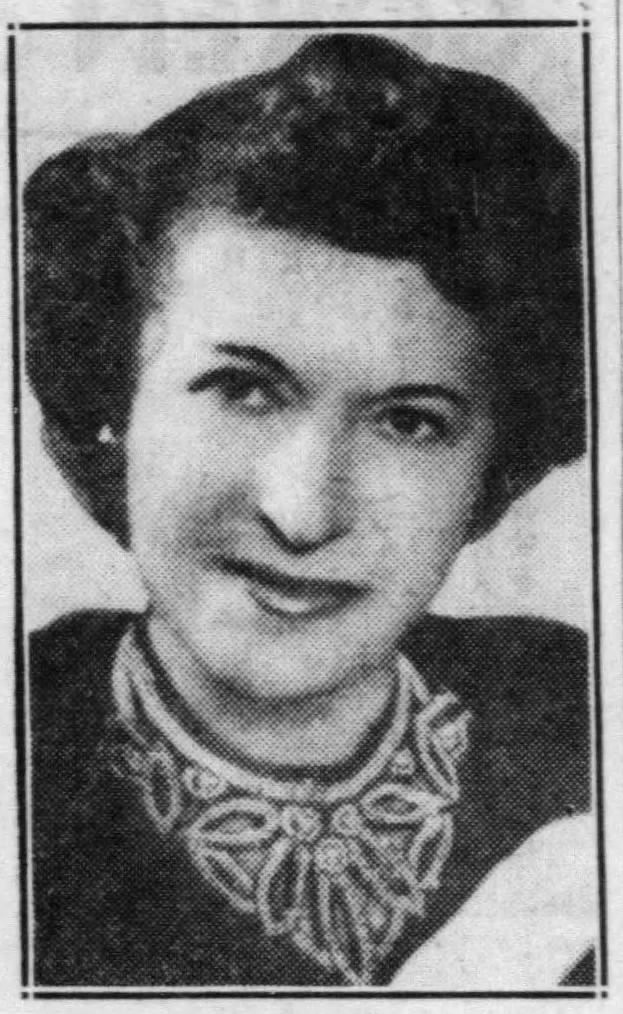
Vera Rozanko

Vera Rozanka (Yiddish: װעראַ ראָזאַנקאַ, 1893–1985), was a Ukrainian Yiddish Theatre actor and manager, soprano, writer, radio performer, and recording artist. During her career, she shared the stage with many notables of the Yiddish Theatre world, including Aaron Lebedeff, Ben Bonus, Fraydele Oysher, Miriam Kressyn and Menasha Skulnik. Among her typical acts were to perform as non-Jewish Russian, Ukrainian or Romani characters in folk costumes, performing under the name "the yiddishe shikse" (Shiksa).

== Biography ==
She was born Shifra Viner (שפרה װינער) in Konotop, Chernigov Governorate, Russian Empire (now in Sumy Oblast, Ukraine) on November 4, 1893. Her father was an entrepreneur or contractor. She had a traditional education in a Cheder and in a general equivalency school. As a youth she was already performing as a singer in school and at private celebrations. She soon began playing child roles in the Yiddish Theatre.

In 1914, she married the Polish-born Yiddish Theatre actor and playwright Israel Rosenberg in Warsaw and they emigrated to Canada in 1917. She acted in the Yiddish theatre there and wrote poetry and stories for Yiddish-language newspapers in Winnipeg and Toronto. At some point she adopted Vera Rosenberg as her name and Vera Rozanka or Rozanko as her stage name. Their daughter Rebecca (Betty) was born in Toronto in September 1918. In 1921 they relocated to New York City, settling in Brooklyn. There she gradually became well known as a Yiddish Theatre actor and would often perform in her husband's translations of Ukrainian plays. She became known for her act as the "yiddishe shikse", where she would sing Russian- or Ukrainian-language songs, or perform in skits with a Russian accent and broken English.

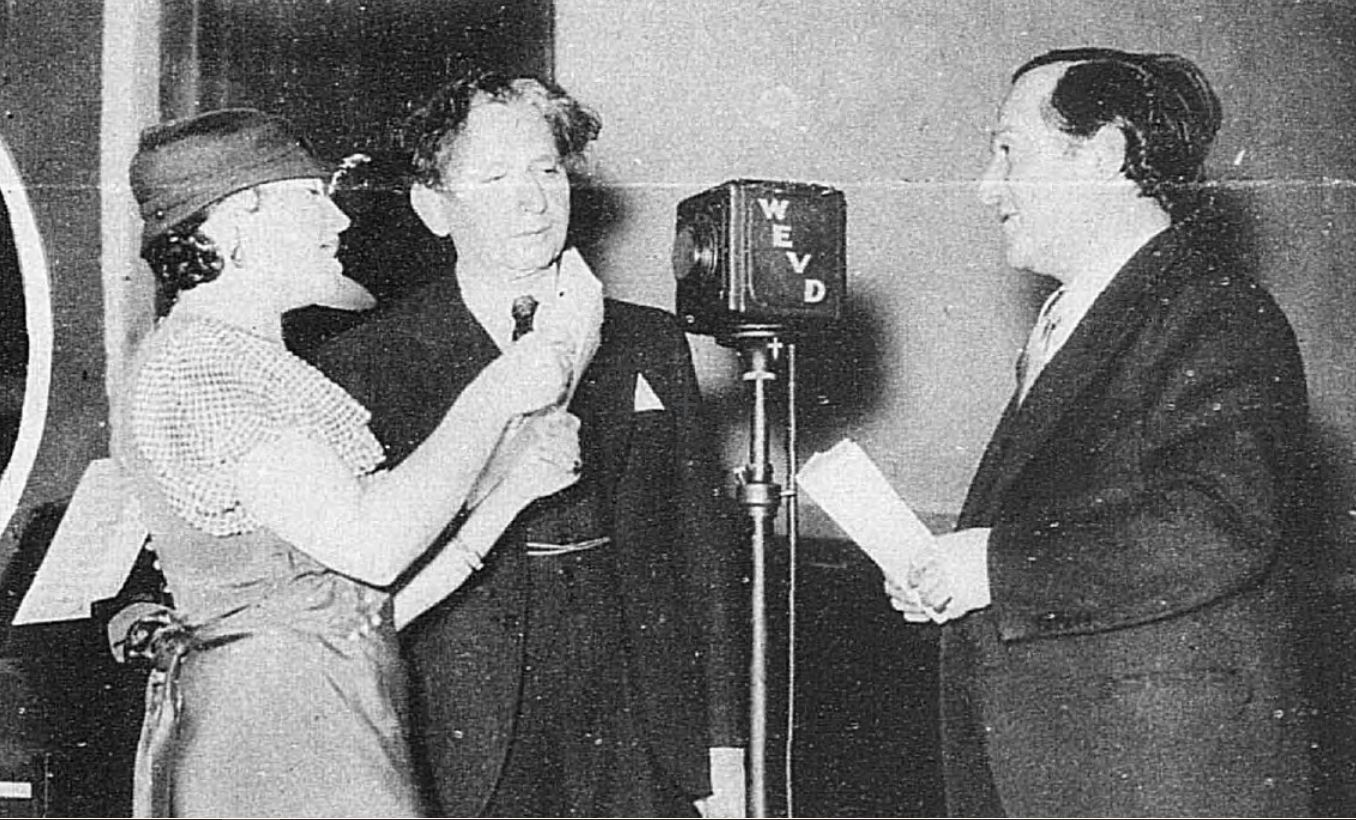
Vera Rozanko, A. L. Baron and Israel Rosenberg performing a skit on WEVD radio circa 1933

In the 1930s, she and her husband also worked on the Yiddish-language radio, with Israel acting as announcer and Vera as singer. In particular, she played on the radio and then on the stage an autobiographical programme called the Yiddishe Shiksa. She also continued to appear on stage, playing at the Hopkinson Theatre with such figures as Menasha Skulnik. And she continued to write, publishing a book of stories in 1934 titled Fun shtot un dorf. During the 1930s and 1940s she also made a handful of 78-rpm disc recordings of Russian and Yiddish songs on small labels like Sun and Ivro Records.

After World War II, she continued to act, appearing in plays produced by her husband at the Clinton Theatre alongside such actors as Aaron Lebedeff and Miriam Kressyn. As the Yiddish theatre declined in popularity, she and Israel also turned increasingly to Vaudeville performances and radio appearances, including a weekly program sponsored by Manischewitz. She then headlined Israel's new theatre in around 1949, which was called Vera Rozanko's National Theatre, playing such actors as Florence Weiss, Irving Jacobson, Fyvush Finkel, and Max Kletter. She also continued to appear the Clinton Theatre, performing in productions with Ben Bonus, Fraydele Oysher, and others.

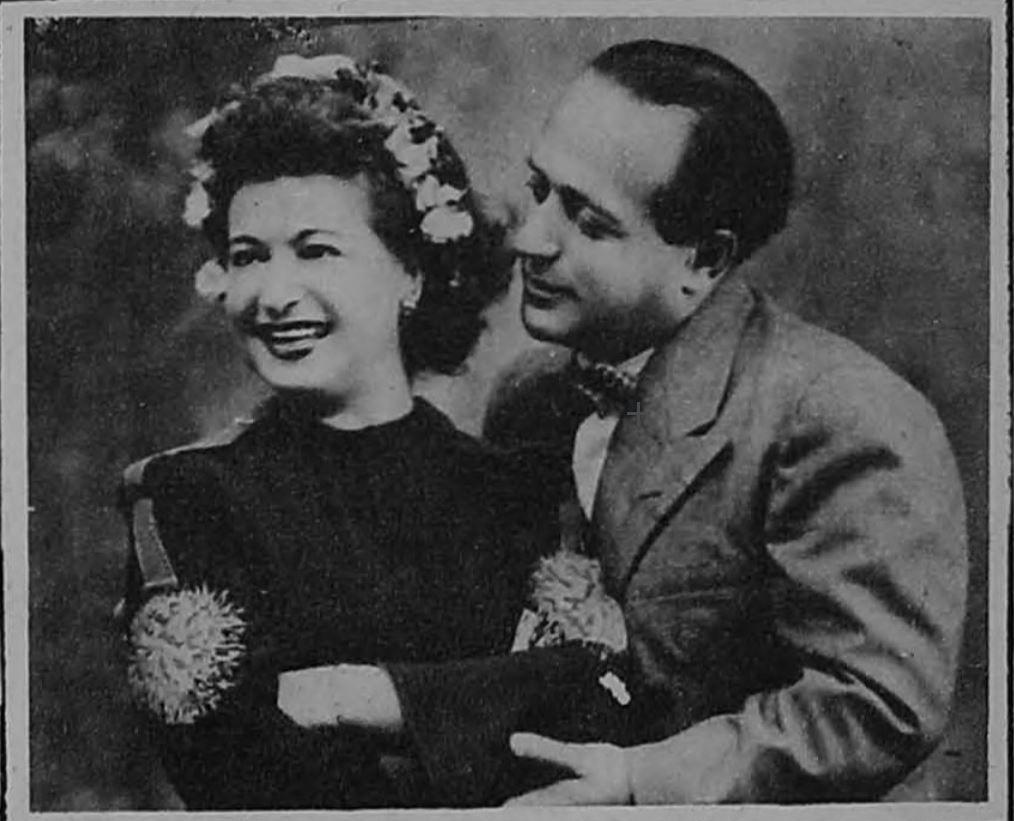
Vera Rozanko and Israel Rosenberg

In 1951 she was a key member of a new troupe that was founded at the Educational Alliance Playhouse. It seems to have folded by the early 1950s, and in 1954 she collaborated in a new effort funded by the Hebrew Actors' Union, where she co-directed the reopened Elsmere theatre with her husband. After that, even though the Yiddish theatre continued to dwindle in popularity, she continued to appear on stage until the late 1970s.

She died on August 27, 1985, in New York City.

== Family ==
Rozanka was the aunt of the Canadian novelist Mordecai Richler through her husband Israel Rosenberg; Richler visited them in New York and attended some of their performances as a youth, in addition to hearing some of their radio broadcasts. Israel and Vera's only daughter, Betty Rosenberg Perlov, also became an actor in the Yiddish theatre, and in 2013 published a book based on her childhood as the daughter of actors.
