= Joanna Sternberg =

American musician and visual artist

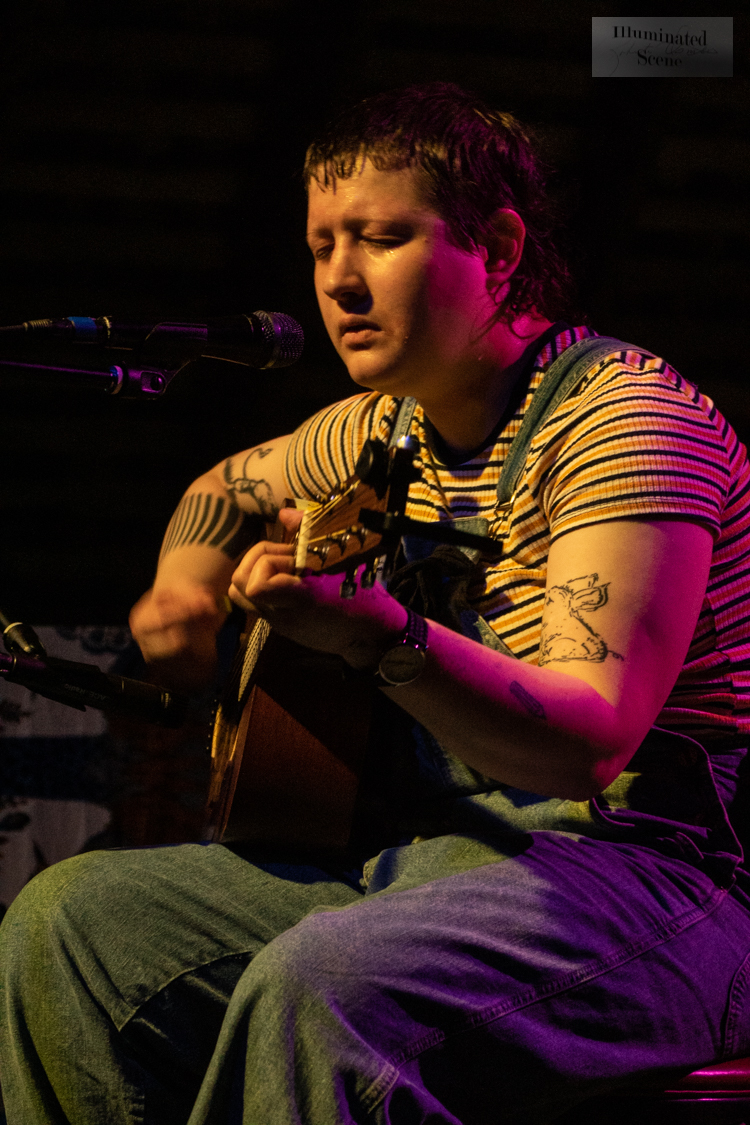
Sternberg performing in 2019

Joanna Sternberg (born August 18, 1991) is an American singer, songwriter, visual artist and multi-instrumentalist born and based in New York City.

== Early life ==
Sternberg is the grandchild of Fraydele Oysher. Moishe Oysher is their great uncle and Marilyn Michaels is their aunt. They are also the grandchild of opera singer Harold Sternberg and the child of guitarist, songwriter, and visual artist Michael Sternberg.

Sternberg started piano lessons at five years old and taught themself to play guitar and electric bass at 11. They took singing lessons after being told they couldn't sing.

Sternberg grew up in a "religiously Beatles obsessed household listening to Little Richard, Chuck Berry, James Brown. Later became obsessed with Motown- specifically James Jameson- and Bob Dylan, Elliott Smith and Randy Newman." Fat Possum Records states that "Tough old New York music like Ramones, Lou Reed, and 20th Century Broadway musicals inform Joanna’s approach to songs. They name other direct inspirations: Scott Joplin, Mingus, Brahms, Mahalia Jackson, Mahler, Louis Armstrong, Mozart, James Jamerson, Judee Sill, Thad Jones/Mel Lewis Orchestra, Neil Young and Rev Gary Davis." They watched the John Lennon's Jukebox documentary broadcast by The South Bank Show and Really Rosie.

Sternberg attended Fiorello H. LaGuardia High School and began to study double bass in their freshman year. They received a full college to Mannes School of Music, where they studied classical double bass for a year and a half. They then took a gap year, which was spent primarily drawing comics in their room. They went on to finish their degree at the School of Jazz and Contemporary Music.

They began writing songs at the age of twenty-three and performing in public at the age of twenty-four.

== Career ==
Sternberg released their debut full-length album, Then I Try Some More, on Team Love Records, later picked up on Fat Possum Records.

Sternberg went on their first tour opening for Conor Oberst in North America in July 2018.

In 2021, Sternberg helped write the soundtrack for the musical Corsicana with Will Arbery.

Sternberg's second album, I've Got Me, was released in 2023, on Fat Possum Records; it was produced by Matt Sweeney and recorded at Strange Weather studios in Brooklyn. Sternberg wrote it while living on the 40th floor of a tower in Manhattan Plaza. The album was recorded in six days.

“I pretty much stayed out of Joanna’s way, let them know they sounded great and allowed the music to happen - Strange Weather’s engineer Daniel Schlett always captured each unique performance with depth and clarity. I just kept the energy up and bathed in the tunes," said Sweeney.

== Personal life ==
Sternberg identifies as gender neutral and uses singular they/them pronouns. They are based in Midtown Manhattan.

Sternberg is Jewish. They are autistic and have ADHD.

== Discography ==
Studio albums

- Then I Try Some More (2019, Fat Possum Records)
- I've Got Me (2023, Fat Possum Records)
