= Yiddish cinema =

Genre of film

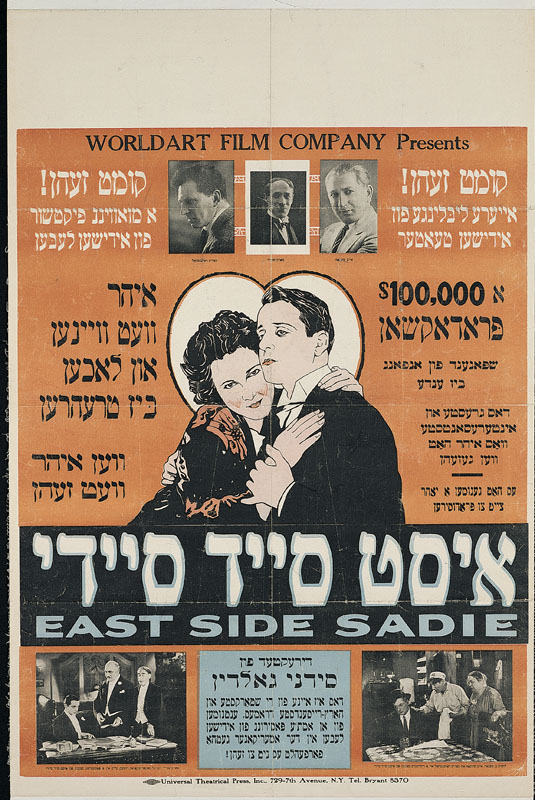
A Yiddish-language poster for East Side Sadie, directed by Sidney M. Goldin, 1929.

Yiddish cinema (Yiddish: יידישע קינא, יידיש-שפראכיגע קינא, romanized: Idish-Shprakhige Kino, Idishe Kino) refers to the Yiddish language film industry which produced some 130 full-length motion pictures and 30 shorts during its heyday from 1911 and 1940. Yiddish film almost disappeared after World War II, due to the Holocaust and the linguistic acculturation of Jewish immigrants, though new pictures are still made sporadically.

== Silent era ==
In September 1911, at the Minsk Electric Theatre, a Jewish troupe led by A.M. Smolarsky accompanied a short projection of silent motion pictures with the Yiddish song A Brivele der Mamen (Letter to Mother). This was one of the first documented instances of Yiddish cinema. At the very same time, short silent films with Yiddish intertitles were being directed for Jews in the Pale of Settlement and Congress Poland. The most notable producer was the Warsaw-based Mordka Towbin, whose studio Siła released four short features adapted from the plays of Jacob Gordin within the year: Der Vilder Foter ("Cruel Father"), with Zina Goldstein and Ester Rachel Kaminska, directed by Marek Arnstein; der Metoiref ("The Madman"); Got, mentsh un tayvl ("God, Man and Satan"); and Mirele Efros. Another series of shorts based on plays were directed by a Warsaw studio Kosmofilm, founded by Shmuel Ginzberg and Henryk Finkelstein. Both companies employed the prominent actors of the city's Yiddish theater scene. In total, including several ones meted out in Russia, some 20 silent court métrage pictures with Yiddish titles were made before the end of World War I.

The postwar years saw the production of full-length features. Sidney M. Goldin, born in Odessa as Shmuel Goldstein, directed several films in America before moving to Vienna in the early 1920s and trying his luck with Yiddish. He produced two films: the 1923 Mazel Tov, starring Molly Picon in a comedy of errors about a young American visiting her traditional family in Galicia; and the 1924 Yizkor, with Maurice Schwartz as a Jewish guardsman who rebuffs a Christian noblewoman. In the Soviet Union, two silent Yiddish films were released during the decade. These were Alexander Granovsky's 1925 Idishe Glikn ("Jewish Luck"), based on Sholem Aleichem's wheeler-dealer character Menachem Mendel, starring Solomon Mikhoels, and the 1928 Durkh trern ("Through Tears"), which likewise adapted Sholem Aleichem's stories and was directed by Grigori Gritscher.

In independent Poland, executive Leo Forbert was responsible for three silent Yiddish features which did well at the box office: Tkies Khaf (1924), based on S. Ansky's play The Dybbuk, Der Lamed-Wownik (1925), set in the 1863 January Uprising, and In di Poylishe Velder (1927). These films were even exported to Romania and other countries for local Jewish audiences. Forbert's productions represented the pinnacle of Yiddish cinema up to that time, and were of relatively high artistic quality. However, they were the last for several years. New York had a thriving Yiddish cultural scene, and in 1926 Maurice Schwartz directed the first American picture in the language, Tsebrokhene Hertser ("Broken Hearts"), based on the play by Jacob Adler and starring Schwartz and Lila Lee.

== Talkies ==
In 1929, Sydney M. Goldin returned from Vienna to the Lower East Side, where he formed a partnership with producer Max Cohen. They decided to use popularized sound technology. In May 1929 they completed East Side Sadie, which had a few scenes with synchronized dialogue: J. Hoberman noted that in fact, it "contained scarcely more Yiddish than the few words heard in The Younger Generation". Then, on 25 October, they released Ad Mosay ("Until When"; English title: The Eternal Prayer). With a budget of $3,000, this 36-minute musical revue loosely inspired by the 1929 Hebron massacre was the first real Yiddish talkie. Goldin then allied with executive Joseph Seiden, who established the studio Judea Film and was keen on reaching the large Yiddish-speaking immigrant public. The pair produced eight short (one or two reel) sound pictures within just a year, each within a $3,000 budget and a single day of principal photography. The artistic quality of these films was deemed so low that the Yiddish Actors' Union prohibited its members from appearing in them, lest they damage the union's reputation.

Goldin chose to attempt a more serious – and expensive – approach. He found new investors and, in 1931, spent $20,000 on making the musical Zayn Vayb's Liubovnik ("His Own Wife's Lover"), the first full-length sound feature film in the language. Goldin continued to direct, and though leading as the most prolific Yiddish film director in history with 29 titles, he was joined by a few others in the field. George Roland, for one, created eight Yiddish films in America during the 1930s. New York, with its bustling ethnic cinema industry which aimed to satisfy the immigrants' demand for films in their native languages (from Spanish to Ukrainian), now surpassed Eastern Europe in producing Yiddish-language films.

In the Soviet Union, while Jewish-themed film was not uncommon, only a single Yiddish sound motion picture was ever produced. This was Boris Shpis' 1932 Nosn Beker fort Aheym ("The Return of Nathan Becker"), about a Soviet-Jewish worker who travels to America only to be disillusioned with capitalism. In Poland, Alexander Marten's 1935 Al Khet ("For the Sin") had synchronized sound and was also the country's first Yiddish film after an eight-year hiatus.

The move to sound was also accompanied by an attempt to reach the market in Mandatory Palestine. However, Yiddish raised the bitter ire of Hebrew-only proponents, who led a vigorous campaign to suppress the language in the country. On 27 September 1930, Goldin's A Idishe Mame ("A Jewish Mother") opened in Tel Aviv. A violent disturbance erupted and the screen was pelted with ink-filled eggs. The distributors backed down and agreed to release the film in a silent format. Ya'akov Davidon dubbed Yiddish films into Hebrew for the next few years, the only way they were allowed under what Ella Shohat termed "the unofficial banning of Yiddish in the Yishuv".

== Brief golden age ==
Producer Joseph Green was dissatisfied with the low artistic merit of American Yiddish film. He concluded that in Poland he would be able to minimize production costs and yet have access to first-rate actors and equipment. After enlisting Molly Picon at a relatively astronomical fee of $10,000, he travelled to Warsaw and directed Yiddle with His Fiddle in 1936. At a total budget of $50,000, the story of a young woman who dresses as a man and joins her father's klezmer band became a worldwide hit among Jewish audiences. Expenses were covered even before its American premiere. The film was exported to Australia, South Africa, and Western Europe, where it was greeted by local Jewish immigrants. While no detailed records were kept, hundreds of thousands of tickets were sold. It was even sent to Nazi Germany, where Jews were banned from Aryan movie theaters and had to hold their own screenings.

Yiddle's commercial success inaugurated a short boom of Yiddish cinema. Convinced there was a large enough market, producer Roman Rebush hired director Edgar G. Ulmer to adapt Peretz Hirschbein's play Green Fields. Hirschbein's piece depicted a scholarly, melancholic yeshiva bokhr (student) who leaves the study hall to meet "real Jews" and falls in love with a peasant's daughter whom he secretly tutors in Hebrew. Ulmer's Green Fields had an international acclaim rivaling Yiddle with his Fiddle, again with hundreds of thousands (even a million, according to one reporter) of viewers.

Green and Ulmer both remained in the Yiddish cinema and each directed several other films until the end of the decade. In 1937, Michał Waszyński directed The Dybbuk in Warsaw. Investors were impressed with the success of Le Golem and The Dybbuk was targeted also at non-Jewish viewers, the only Yiddish film conceived so. While not paralleling the sales of Yiddle or Green Fields, it is considered by most critics as the highest quality and most artistically accomplished production in the history of Yiddish cinema.

The fourth great Yiddish film of the era was directed by Maurice Schwartz in 1939. Tevya, starring Schwartz as Sholem Aleichem's milkman, had a particularly high budget of $70,000 and a dark, contemplative plot, unlike most Yiddish productions which were popular melodramas. Photographed in Long Island, it became the first non-English production to be selected for preservation by the American National Film Registry in 1991.

In addition to these four major pieces, more than 20 Yiddish motion pictures were directed in the United States and Poland until 1940. Most were lighthearted comedies or emotional family dramas, like Shimon Dzigan's and Israel Shumacher's 1937 Freylikhe Kabtzonim.

== Decline and survival ==
At the very moment the industry seemed to be gaining momentum, the outbreak of World War II brought it to a complete halt. Six months before the war, Poland's last Yiddish film On a Heym ("Homeless") was released on 21 February 1939. 1940 still saw the completion of six pictures in the United States, including Ulmer's Amerikaner Shadkhn ("American Matchmaker") and Der Vilner Balabesl ("Overture to Glory") starring Moishe Oysher. Joseph Seiden's low-quality Mazel Tov, Iden, an edited compilation of musical numbers, was the last, distributed in 1941.

With the extermination of Eastern Europe's Jews, Yiddish culture lost the bulk of its audience. In the US, the Americanization of the immigrants' children and their exodus from the East Coast's crowded neighbourhoods to suburbia signaled its demise, as well. In the Soviet Union, most Jews voluntarily eschewed Yiddishist efforts in favour of cultural and linguistic Russification already in the 1930s; their children were raised speaking Russian, and state-led purges destroyed the remaining Yiddishist institutions.

In 1946, Saul Goskind founded the Kinor cooperative in Poland, producing newsreels and documentaries in Yiddish. In 1947 and 1948 Kinor released two full-length films, Mir Leben Geblibene ("We Who Remained Alive") and Unzere Kinder ("Our Children"), directed by Nathan Gross. Long Is the Road from 1948, the only Yiddish film to be made in Germany, was screened for the audiences at the displaced persons camps. Meanwhile, Yiddish cinema disappeared in the United States along with the other ethnic film industries. The two last commercially distributed American films, Got, Mentsh un Tayvl (again an adaptation of Gordin's namesake play), and Honeymoon in the Catskills, were released just a week apart on 21 and 27 January 1950. In 1957, a short documentary about the Warsaw Jewish Theatre was the last Yiddish production in Poland.

Joseph Seiden recalled that the few remaining filmmakers had high hopes about a market in the newly independent Israel, but the state, and more so society, enforced a Hebrew-only approach. While official censorship was mild, Yiddish culture was still severely frowned upon and sometimes even legally persecuted; Dzigan and Shumacher had to introduce Hebrew parts into their shows to avoid complications. Ironically, at the very same time, the Israeli government produced two Yiddish short films, though not for internal consumption. Dos Getzelt (1950) and Di Toyer iz Ofen (1957) were both produced for the purposes of propaganda and fund-raising among American Jews. Only in the 1960s did the anti-Yiddish cultural climate sufficiently relax to allow the projection of Yiddish films with their original dialogue.

The language did not disappear from the screen. Apart from select lines in many Jewishly-themed pictures, much of the 1975 film Hester Street was in Yiddish, as was the 1982 Belgian feature Bruxelles-transit. In 1983 the first Israeli full-length Yiddish film was released, Az Men Gibt – Nemt Men ("When They Give – Take"), directed by Alfred Steinhardt. A second, The Last Love of Laura Adler, about an elderly Yiddish actress dying from cancer, was distributed in 1990. In 2005, the emerging home video industry in Ultra-Orthodox circles also meted out an edutainment Yiddish piece, A Gesheft. In 2008, the student film My Father's House, about two Holocaust survivors during the 1948 Arab–Israeli War, was made in Israel. The 2010 Romeo and Juliet in Yiddish was an independent production which employed formerly ultra-Orthodox nonprofessional actors. The 2014 Felix and Meira and 2017 Menashe depicted scenes from the life of Hasidim.

== Bibliography ==
- Crafton, Donald (1999). The Talkies: American Cinema's Transition to Sound, 1926–1931. University of California Press. ISBN 0520221281.
- Goldman, Eric Arthur (1979). A World History of the Yiddish Cinema. New York University.
- Helman, Anat (2014). Becoming Israeli: National Ideals and Everyday Life in the 1950s. Brandeis University Press. ISBN 978-1611685572.
- Hoberman, J. (2010). Bridge of Light: Yiddish Film Between Two Worlds. University Press of New England. ISBN 978-1584658702.
- Koszarski, Richard (2008). Hollywood on the Hudson: Film and Television in New York from Griffith to Sarnoff. Rutgers University Press. ISBN 978-0813542935.
- Nowell-Smith, Geoffrey, ed. (1997). The Oxford History of World Cinema. Oxford University Press. ISBN 0198742428.
- Shneer, David (2004). Yiddish and the Creation of Soviet Jewish Culture: 1918–1930. Cambridge University Press. ISBN 0521826306.
- Shohat, Ella (2010). Israeli Cinema: East/West and the Politics of Representation. I.B. Tauris. ISBN 978-1845113131.
