= The Bewitched Tailor =

Novel by Sholem Aleichem

A 1957 book cover, Soviet Union

The Bewitched Tailor Yiddish: דער פֿאַרכישופֿטער שנײַדער, romanized: Der farkishefter Shnayder), also translated as The Enchanted Tailor, and The Haunted Tailor is a novelette by Sholem Aleichem.

== Plot ==
The frame of the story is that a tailor Shimen-Elye from the village of Zlodeyevke goes to buy a she-goat, but on his way back the innkeeper substitutes it with a he-goat. At home it was found that Shimen-Elye brought a wrong kind of a goat. When he goes back to the seller to complain about the wrong goat, the innkeeper switches the goats back, and this happens several times, until Shimen-Elye goes crazy.

== Discussion ==
Initially it was published in a chapbook titled A mayse on an ek ("A story without end") in Warsaw in 1901, with the subtitle "Aroysgenumen fun an altn pinkes un baputst" ("taken from an old community book and embellished") (Warsaw: Bildung, 1901/1902, 1903/1904), 60 pp. Jeremy Dauber comments that Sholem-Aleichem's notes suggest that he planned three stories "without end": "a story with a corpse" (made into Eternal Life), "a story with a golem", and "a story with a goat" (made into The Bewitched Tailor). It is suggested that the latter one was based on a story by Isaac Meir Dik (1814-1893) from his mayse-bikhlekh (storybooks), how a rarity, titled Oyzer Tsinkes un di tsig (Oyzer Tsinkes and the She-Goat, 1868).

David Roskies writes that The Bewitched Tailor is the only attempt of Sholem Aleichem in a stylized folk tale and gives a detailed commentary on the story: its language, allusions, and meaning.

== Translations and adaptations ==
- Russian: Заколдованный портной
  - Шолом-Алейхем, Заколдованный портной, with lithographs by Anatoly Kaplan. Ленингр: отд. худ. фонда СССР, 1957
  - By Mikhail Shambadal, 1969, 1971, 1988
  - In 1973, the theater director Felix Berman staged the first Jewish musical in the Soviet Union called The Bewitched Tailor, performed at the Moscow Jewish Drama Ensemble (now the Shalom Theatre).
- English:
  - "The Bewitched Tailor", translated by Bernard Isaacs (1882–1975) in the collection with the same title, Foreign Languages Publishing House, Moscow, 1955
  - "The Haunted Tailor," in Irving Howe and Ruth R. Wisse eds., The Best of Sholom Aleichem (New York: Simon & Schuster, 1979).

In 1928, Grigory Gricher of All-Ukrainian Photo Cinema Administration shot the silent film Durkh trern (Through Tears), based on stories The Bewithced Tailor and Motl, Peysi the Cantor's Son. It was sold to the United States, voiced in Yiddish and played there in 1933. Both 35 mm versions were lost, only a 16mm version was found and digitally restored by the National Center for Jewish Film under the title Laughter Through Tears in 1991.

A short variant of the story is incorporated into the children's story "Shlemiel, the Businessman" by Isaac Bashevis Singer as the first Shlemiel's flopped business.
