= Motl, Peysi the Cantor's Son =

Motl, an illustration by Samuel Cahan, 1916

Motl, Peysi the Cantor's Son, subtitled The Writings of an Orphan Boy (מאָטל פּייסי דעם חזנס; כתבֿים פֿון אַ ייִנגל אַ יתום — motl peysi dem khazns; ksovim fun a yingl a yosem), is the last novel by the Yiddish author Sholem Aleichem, and unfinished at the time of his death. It was published in two separate volumes. The first was headed From Home to America (פֿון דער היים קיין אַמעריקע — fun der heym keyn amerike), relating the protagonist's experiences in Europe, and appearing in 1907. The second was headed In America (אין אַמעריקע — in amerike), chronicling his life in New York City, and written in 1916. They were printed on numerous occasions in various formats and with differing orthographic conventions. A critical edition of the Yiddish text was published in 1997.

== Summary ==
The novel is a first person narrative presented by a boy who, at the outset, is not quite nine years old. He is a member of a Jewish family in Kasrilevke, a fictional shtetl (East European Jewish village) which appears in many works by Sholem Aleichem, and chronicles the daily life of his family and friends. The first volume describes the hardships, poverty, and fears that lead to a decision to emigrate to the United States. The second volume relates their experiences from the immigrant perspective. The narrative presents almost every episode in a humorous manner, even when the events are quite serious.

Motl's father, the village's cantor, passes away after a long illness. Motl discovers that being fatherless confers on him certain social privileges, and the more ready forgiveness of the adult community for his pranks. (Although there are repeated references to Motl being an orphan, the term is not used in its present-day sense. His mother is a major figure throughout the entire work.) His older brother Elyahu, recently married, tries to lift the family out of poverty through a series of get-rich-quick schemes he learns from a book, to which Motl is a willing accomplice. However, this effort does not have the desired effect. Together with a group of friends, they depart for America. (It is later told that some time after their departure, Kasrilevke was the target of a particularly severe pogrom, impelling many of the family's neighbors to follow them to America).

The route to New York, via Antwerp and London's Whitechapel, is lined with danger, con-artists, other refugees, unfamiliar customs, and a long ocean crossing. At first America only seems to offer new problems, in the form of the austere immigration control on Ellis Island, the sweatshops of the Lower East Side, and the labor riots that often broke out as workers took to the streets to protest working conditions. Life in New York affords Motl unanticipated new experiences (such as smoking and watching Charlie Chaplin movies), and slowly, the family begins to prosper. The process of learning English presents some new humorous episodes, the mother repeatedly saying "I am going to the chicken to cook the kitchen". In the last chapters they buy a grocery store and appear to be moving toward ever greater material comfort.

Meanwhile, they are joined in New York by many others of their townspeople, and learn that some time after their departure, Kasrilevke was devastated in a terrible pogrom - impelling many others of its inhabitants to follow them to America.

The very last page which Sholem Aleichem ever wrote tells of Motl and his brother getting annoyed with a man who every morning passes and looks at the paper but never buys it. The author's death left this episode forever incomplete.

Motl is described as having a natural talent for drawing cartoons – sometimes getting into trouble with people feeling insulted by his depiction of them. Some episodes indicate that the author intended to have the character enter a journalistic career.

== Translations and adaptations ==
The novel was first translated into English in 1953 by Tamara Kahana as Adventures of Mottel, the Cantor's Son (Henry Schuman Inc., New York), also included in a bilingual edition with the same title in 1999 (Sholom Aleichem Family Publications, New York, ISBN 1-929068-00-X). It was translated again in 2002 by Hillel Halkin in The Letters of Menakhem-Mendl and Sheyne-Sheyndl; and, Motl, the Cantor’s Son (Yale University Press, New Haven, ISBN 0-300-09246-6). On the occasion of the 150th anniversary of the author's birth in 2009, a third translation was published by Aliza Shevrin in Tevye the Dairyman and Motl the Cantor's Son, with an introduction by Dan Miron (Penguin Classics, New York, ISBN 978-0-14-310560-2).

In 1922, the artist Rahel Szalit published a book of 16 lithographs to serve as illustrations to Sholom Aleichem's text. See Rahel Szalit-Marcus, Menshelakh und stsenes: Sekhtsen tsaykhenungen tsu Shalom Aleichems Verk "Motl peysi dem khasns yingl" (Berlin: Klal-Verlag, 1922).

In 1928, Grigory Gricher of All-Ukrainian Photo Cinema Administration shot the silent film Durkh trern (Through Tears), based on stories The Bewitched Tailor and Motl, Peysi the Cantor's Son. It was sold to the United States, voiced in Yiddish by "Worldkino Corporation", and played there in 1933. Both 35 mm versions were lost, only a 16mm version was found and digitally restored by the National Center for Jewish Film under the title Laughter Through Tears in 1991.
