= Rebecca Weintraub =

Odesa-born American Yiddish stage actress (1873-1952)

- Born: 1873; Odesa
- Died: 30 July 1952; New York City
- Occupation: Actor

Rebecca Weintraub (1873 – July 30, 1952) was an actress in Yiddish theater and Yiddish film who was born in Odessa, Russian Empire.

Her maiden name was Rebecca Fusfeld. She came to America at the age of fifteen. Beginning in her teenage years she played supporting and leading roles with Jacob Adler, Boris Thomashefsky, Bertha Kalish, Molly Picon, and others. She had a sixty year career on the stage, which included roles in His Wife's Lover (1929), Women of New York (1930), The Girl from Warsaw (1931), The Kibitzer (1931), Under One Roof (1932), The New Man (1932), God Man and Devil (1935), and Oy, Is Dus a Leben! (1942). Weintraub's last stage role of significance was in The Family Carnovsky (1943). A newspaper report in advance of that play described Weintraub as "one of the best-loved as well as best known actresses on the Yiddish Theatre stage today".

Weintraub appeared in a number of silent and Yiddish-language films, most significantly Maurice Schwartz's Tevya (1939), which drew from the same sources as Fiddler on the Roof (1964).

Rebecca Weintraub died in Polyclinic Hospital on July 30, 1952 at the age of 79. She was the widow of Sigmund Weintraub, Yiddish theater actor-manager.

== Filmography ==
- Breaking Home Ties (1922)
- Uncle Moses (1932)
- Tsvey Shvester ("Two Sisters", 1938)
- Tevya (1939)
- Dray Tekhter ("Three Daughters", 1949)
