= Tcherikover =

Tcherikover (Russian: Чериковер, Hebrew: צ'ריקובר, also transliterated Tcherikower, Tsherikover, Tscherikower, or Cherikover) is a Yiddish toponymic surname literally meaning "someone from Cherikov". Notable people with the surname include:

- Elias Tcherikower (1881–1943), Historian of Jewish life and anti-Jewish violence in the Russian Empire; co-founder of YIVO
- Victor Tcherikover (1894–1958), Russian-Israeli scholar
- Grigory Gricher (1893–1945), birth name Cherikover, Soviet film director and screenwriter
