= Yiddle With His Fiddle =

1936 film by Joseph Green

Yidl Mitn Fidl
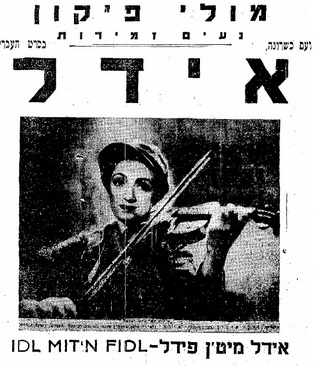
- Advertisement in Davar, 1937.
- Directed by: Joseph Green; Jan Nowina-Przybylski
- Written by: Joseph Green; Konrad Tom
- Produced by: Jozef Frankfurt; Edward Hantowitz
- Starring: Molly Picon
- Cinematography: Jakob Jonilowicz
- Edited by: Jack Kemp
- Music by: Abe Ellstein
- Production company: Green Films
- Distributed by: Sphinx Films Corp.
- Release dates: September 30, 1936 (Pol.); December 31, 1936 (US); June 19, 1937 (PEY)
- Running time: 92 minutes
- Country: Poland
- Language: Yiddish
- Budget: $50,000

Yidl Mitn Fidl (Yiddish: אידל מיטן פֿידל, "Yiddle With His Fiddle", Polish: Judeł gra na skrzypcach), is a 1936 musical Yiddish film.

== Plot ==
Arye and his daughter Itke are musicians, or klezmorim, who became impoverished and were evicted from their home in Kazimierz Dolny. Arie sees no choice but to embark on a career of a travelling band, but fears for the safety of his daughter on the dangerous roads. Itke solves the problem by disguising herself as a boy and adopts the persona of "Yidl", ostensibly Arye’s son.

During their voyages, they meet another pair of merrymakers, the father-and-son duo Isaac and Ephraim Kalamutker, with whom they form a quartet and roam through the Polish countryside seeking engagements. "Yidl" falls in love with Ephraim, who is utterly oblivious to the true sex of his companion. The four are hired to perform in the wedding of young Teibele to the old, rich man Zalman Gold. The bride had to cancel her prior engagement with her true love, Yosl Fedlman, for her late father left many unpaid debts. Yidl takes pity on Teibele and the quartet smuggle her out of the party and have her join them as vocalist. To Yidl's dismay, Ephraim is enamored with the young woman. Itke reveals her true self to Isaac, who determines to assist her and leaves to locate Yosl.

When arriving in Warsaw, the group become a success and are hired to perform in a concert. However, personal tensions between the members run high. Efraim signs a contract with a local orchestra. Teibele's lost match finally arrives, and they run off together before the show. Yidl, quite by accident, takes her place and recounts her entire story and love for Efraim in song form. She is applauded and signed on a contract for a career in the United States. Having learned the truth, Efraim abandons his commitments and joins her on the ship to New York.

== Cast ==
- Molly Picon as Itke/Yidl
- Symcha Fostel as Arie
- Leon Liebgold as Efraim Kalamutker
- Max Bozyk as Isaac Kalamutker
- Dora Fakiel as Teibele
- Barbara Liebgold as Teibele's mother
- Samuel Landau as Zalman Gold
- Chana Lewin as Widow Flaumbaum

== Production ==
After the success of Joseph in the Land of Egypt, a silent film dubbed into Yiddish by Joseph Green, he decided to create an entirely Yiddish film, and returned to his native Poland to do so. Yidl Mitn Fidl was the most successful Yiddish film of all time and the most popular of Green's films as well.

The film was shot on location in Kazimierz Dolny, Poland, with local inhabitants as extras. Based on a novella by Konrad Tom, the screenplay was written by Green. Its score was composed by Abraham Ellstein, and the lyrics to the songs were written by Itzik Manger. Jakob Jonilowicz was the photo director of the film.

It was filmed in Poland to minimize costs: the total budget was $50,000. Picon was contemplating entering English-language entertainment and had to be paid an astronomical fee in terms of Yiddish cinema, $10,000 or a fifth of the entire expenditure, to star in the main role. Besides her, all actors were Polish. The film turned into a resounding commercial success and covered the producers' expenses even before opening in the United States. When it premiered in the Ambassador movie theatre, Frank S. Nugent wrote in the New York Times: "It must be set down to her credit that, despite the fact that there is not a single new thing in the whole bag of tricks emptied on the screen, Miss Picon puts so much infectious gayety, not forgetting the proper modicum of sadness, into the action that the result is genuine entertainment." It was exported to most of Western Europe, Australia and South Africa, and was screened in the British Mandate of Palestine with Hebrew dubbing. In Britain, it opened at Academy Cinema, Oxford Street, on 21 July 1937. The picture was exported outside of London and was quite a success; In a review for Night and Day from 29 July 1937, Graham Greene wrote of Yiddle: "a story in which even the music seems to have the dignity and patina of age and race. An odd feeling of freedom pervades the film full of ugly people in bowler-hats strumming in courtyards... Freedom even from the closer tyranny of a well-made script, as if the whole picture were an impromptu performance, like the stories in the Decameron." Several copies were sent to Nazi Germany, where Jews were not allowed to attend regular cinemas, and viewing was restricted to "members of the Jewish Race." Premiere in the hall of the Jüdischer Kulturbund took place on 2 May 1938, and it then ran in communities across Germany.

In 1956, a remastered version, fully dubbed into English, was released in New York for a short run, bearing the title Castles in the Sky.

== Reception ==
Writing for Night and Day in 1937, Graham Greene gave the film a good review, noting that "[a]n odd feeling of freedom pervades the film [...] as if the whole picture were an impromptu performance".
