= Basia Liebgold =

Polish actress (1891–1942/43)

- Born: Basia Heu; November 18, 1891; Przemyśl, Austria-Hungary
- Died: 1942 or 1943; Treblinka extermination camp, General Government
- Occupation: Actress

Basia Liebgold (also Basha, born Basia Heu, November 18, 1891 – 1942 or 1943) was a Polish actress of Jewish origin.

== Life ==
Basia Liebgold was born Basia Heu in Przemyśl, Austria-Hungary in 1891. Her parents were Marcus Sauber and Mindla Heu. She began her theatrical career as a chorus girl in Galician theaters. She subsequently took on roles as a soubrette and later as a prima donna before transitioning to more comedic roles as she grew older. Following her marriage, she performed alongside her husband in the same theaters. In 1936, she was engaged at the Nowości Theatre in Warsaw. She appeared as the bride’s mother in the 1936 musical comedy film Yiddle With His Fiddle. Her son Leon also featured in the film.

On May 18, 1908, Basia Heu married the actor Solomon Liebgold in Przemyśl. The couple had three children: the actors Jan Liebgold (Yonek) and Leon Liebgold, and a daughter Toni (Tanke). After the outbreak of World War II, Basia Liebgold—along with her husband and daughter—traveled from Kraków to Tarnów, where she continued to perform in the theater for a time. In 1942, she was taken to the Treblinka extermination camp, where she was presumably murdered that same year.

Her son, Leon, was married to the actress Lili Liliana.
