= Mohamed El-Fers =

Dutch writer, musician and filmmaker

Mohamed el-Fers (born 1950 in Haarlem) is a Dutch writer, musician and filmmaker.

== Life ==
El-Fers was musician in Los Compañeros (Latin American), Nass el-Ghorba (Moroccan), Tiq Maya (Moroccan), Medina (pop) and Atlal (folkrock). With this last group he had in 1982 a number 1 hit in Egypt and Sudan and appeared in El Alem Ghani the Egyptian television show by Hamdia Hamdi.

He published in Hitweek / Aloha, De Groene Amsterdammer, Nieuwe Revu, Algemeen Dagblad, the Turkish newspaper Dünya and De Staatskrant.

Together with René Zwaap, he founded MokumTV, one of the best viewed programmes of Salto TV, a local television station in Amsterdam. For MokumTV he made several documentaries, later released on DVD.

El-Fers produced in 1996 for Hippo Records two CDs with Leo Fuld, the 'king of Yiddish music'.

He wrote biographies on e.g. Jacques Brel, Mevlana Rumi, Oum Kalsoum and Bob Marley and published travel guides about Istanbul, Lourdes and Amsterdam. He also wrote an "Encyclopedie van Hollandse Heiligen", an encyclopedia on Dutch Saints.

Together with Veyis Güngör, El-Fers took the initiative that would become the UNESCO Mevlana Year in 2007. See Mevlana800.

== Some of his books in Dutch ==
- Bob Marley (1991) ISBN 90-5330-015-5
- Jacques Brel (1991) ISBN 90-5330-017-1
- Mehmed VI : de laatste sultan (1991) ISBN 90-5330-023-6
- Columbus (1991) ISBN 90-5330-032-5
- Oum Kalsoum (1991) ISBN 90-5330-037-6
- Mevlânâ (1992) ISBN 90-5330-049-X
- Istanbul (1993) ISBN 90-5330-054-6 (2007) ISBN 978-90-77814-05-5
- Jacques Brel (1994, 1996 en 1998) ISBN 90-5330-245-X / ISBN 90-5312-113-7

== Some of his books in English ==
- Lourdes beyond clichés: The Complete Guide to Lourdes (2007)
- Kirkpinar, all about Turkish Oilwrestling(2007)
- Mevlana Rumi (2006)

== Filmography ==
- Mevlana (Hypnotic Trance Dance, complete ritual) DVD TM 04-1
- Oil over Europe-I (Turkish Oil Wrestling) DVD TM 04-2
- Mehter in Holland (Ritual Music by the Janisari) DVD TM 04-3
- Maria in de Koran (bonus: Mirakel van Amsterdam, Ida Peerdeman interview) DVD TM 04-4

== Award ==
For his Mevlanabiography he received on May 5, 2003 during the 3rd international Mevlanacongress of the Selçukuniversity of Konya (Turkey) the Merit of Honour by the Turkish Secretary of State for Religion, Prof. Mehmet Aydin.
