= Leo Fuld =

Dutch singer

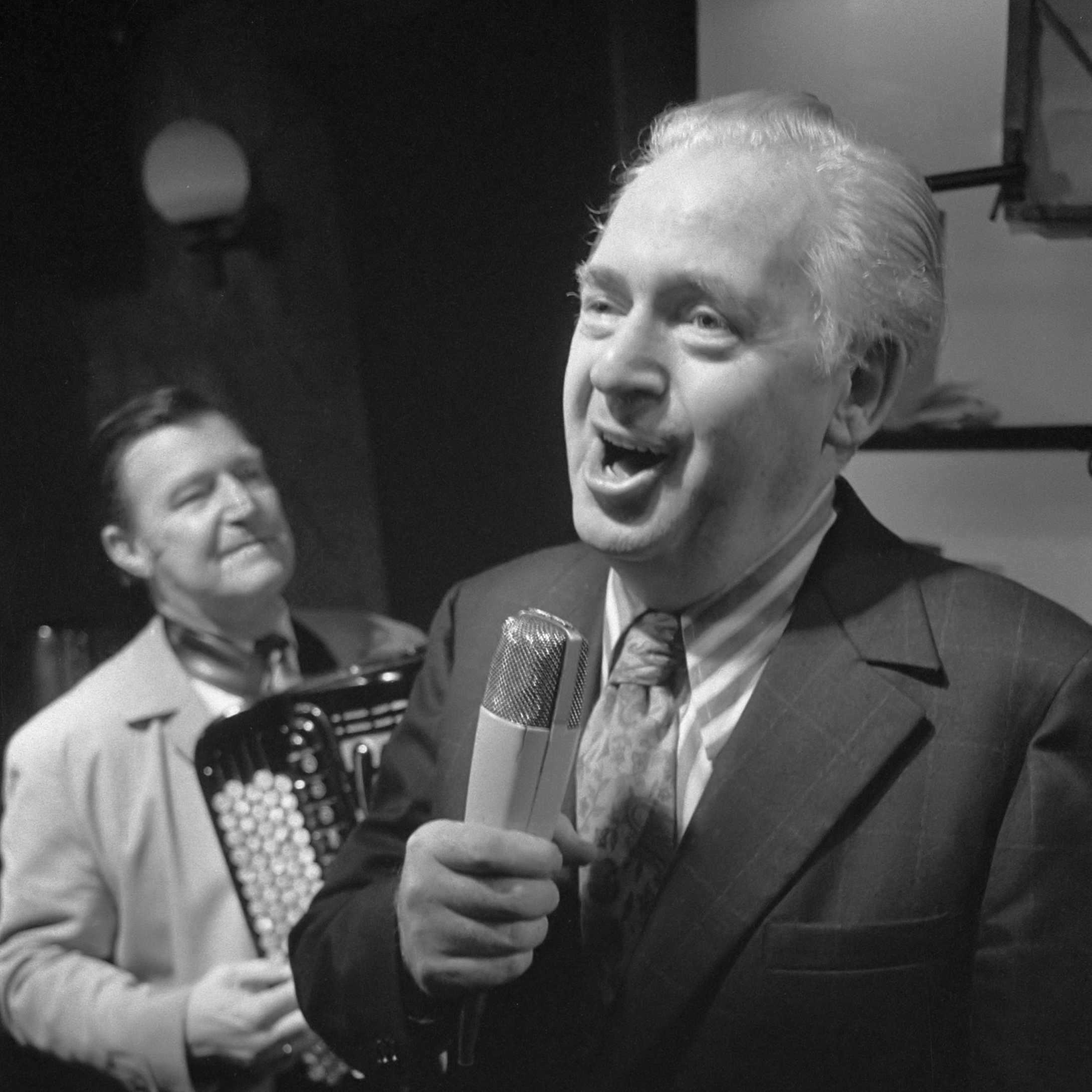
Leo Fuld (1971)

Lazarus 'Leo' Fuld (Yiddish: לעאָ פֿולד; Rotterdam, October 29, 1912 – Amsterdam, June 10, 1997) was a Dutch singer who specialised in Yiddish songs.

Fuld recorded throughout Europe and the Americas in several languages, including Yiddish, English, German, French, Hebrew, and Dutch. After World War II, he resumed his recording career and performed internationally at nightclubs and concert venues. At the age of 83, he released his final recording, which has been described as the Sergeant Pepper of Yiddish music.

== Early life ==
Leo Fuld was the third of ten children from a poor Jewish family. His father, Louis Fuld, was a merchant in occasional goods. Fuld's talent for singing already showed at a young age during services in the synagogue. Fuld received a study grant for the Seminarium. His parents expected that the young Leo would develop into a 'chazzan', the chorister in the synagogue. On his sixteenth birthday, Fuld already began leading services in 'sjoels' in the province. At this time he would also sing secular music in bars. He made his debut in a Rotterdam bar where he sang sixty songs for one dollar. His initial successes led him to enter an audition at VARA-radio. Here he was taken on directly and made his debut beside Louis Davids. Fuld left for the United Kingdom in 1932 to audition at the BBC and was to become the first Dutch singer ever behind a BBC microphone.

He was heard by the famous Jack Hylton, who signed the 19-year-old Fuld to a three-year contract with his celebrated band, which resulted in engagements in every important theatre in the British Isles and the Continent. In 1936 he was signed by Clifford C. Fischer for the French Casino in New York and later the Paramount Theatre on Broadway. As an International favorite, Fuld started to adapt Yiddish and Hebrew songs for inclusion in his repertoire. At the French Casino his biggest song was Rosinkes Mit Mandeln, and the great Al Jolson came back every night at "five to ten" just to catch his performance.

== World War II ==
In 1938 his temporary visa ran out and he had to return to Europe where he applied for an immigration visa. He caught the last boat back before the Nazis invaded the Lowlands and immediately offered his services to the Dutch government-in-exile. Together with the late Hendrik Willem van Loon, Fuld started the shortwave broadcasts to the Netherlands and the Dutch East Indies. Rumors reached the UK of what was happening to the Jewish population of the Netherlands and that almost the complete Fuld family had been murdered by the Nazis. As a result, during this period he no longer could face an audience and stopped singing completely.

As he always had a talent for writing, he soon became one of the most sought after material writers on Broadway, writing for such comedians as Milton Berle, the Ritz Brothers, Jackie Miles, Jackie Gleason, Jan Murray, Jerry Lewis and Dean Martin, followed by the "Kraft Music Hall" program. He also produced, directed and wrote a comedy show called Fun For Your Money with which he toured the US.

== Post-war career ==
In 1948 he returned to the Netherlands as an American citizen to search for news about his family. Upon his arrival, in gratitude for his wartime broadcasts, thousands of people greeted him and he was offered a contract to sing at the largest theatre in Amsterdam. Not having sung for over five years he was petrified with fear, but was such a success that he was held over for six weeks. Having regained his confidence, he accepted an engagement at the London Casino where he was a tremendous hit.

Offers followed from all over the world, and while at the Sa Majeste in Paris with his revue, he visited a little Yiddish night club where he heard a survivor of the Warsaw Ghetto sing a song which touched him deeply - "Vi ahin zol Ikh geyn?". Fuld was so impressed that he asked the composer for a copy and said "I'll make this a world hit!". He kept his promise; upon returning to England he wrote English lyrics and recorded it for Decca under the title "Where can I Go?". It was also released in America, and as the saying goes, it took him twenty years to become a star overnight. He sang it on television in the Milton Berle show, the Perry Como Show and in the Frank Sinatra Show, and it was also recorded by some of America's biggest record stars such as Ray Charles and Steve Lawrence. Among his greatest fans were such stars as Billie Holiday, Al Jolson and Édith Piaf.

Since 1949, Leo Fuld made five world tours and appeared in Argentina, Chile, Brazil, North Africa, Egypt, Israel and Lebanon. He shared the stage for 10 weeks with Edith Piaf at the Paris ABC Theatre and was engaged by the Emperor Haile Selassie I of Ethiopia to sing at the wedding of his daughter at the Imperial Palace in Addis Ababa.

In April 1957 he set up his own nightclub in New York, the Cafe Sahbra, which was very successful, before relocating to Las Vegas. There he married Ilone Mendels, having one daughter Mirjam Fuld-Lelah. After divorce Fuld returned to the Netherlands.

With producer Mohamed el-Fers and arranger Kees Post he recorded his last CD, The Legend for the Ghana-based company Hippo Records. On the CD Fuld sings his best known-songs, but they are provided with striking Oriental arrangements.

At 84 Leo Fuld died in his place of residence in Amsterdam.

The remainder of Leo's family lives in the Netherlands while his two favorite nephews (Avi and Peled) live in Israel.

== Short discography ==
- 1933 : A Brievele der Mamme (Parlophone)
- 1933 : Mein Shtetl (c'est sa première chanson à succès : il devient une vedette) (Victrola)
- 1933 : Roumanische Kretsche (Victrola)
- 1934 : A Klesmer Yingel (Oi Mamme! Bin Ich Farliebt) (Victrola)
- 1934 : My Yiddishe Mama (Victrola)
- 1935 : Oif'n Pripetshik (Victrola)
- 1935 : Fraitag Oif der Nacht (Victrola)
- 1935 : Shein Wie Die Lewone (Victrola)
- 1936 : Yiddish ges'l (Odeon)
- 1936 : Dos Pintele Yid (Victrola)
- 1936 : Mo-me-le (Victrola)
- 1937 : Az der Rebbe Tantst (Victrola)
- 1937 : Zigany Melody/Miserlu (acc. Grisha Farfel his trumpet and Orchestra) (Melodisc 5019)
- 1937 : Der Siderel (Yiddele Briederel) (Victrola)
- 1937 : Gesselach (Victrola)
- 1938 : A Letter to My Mother / You're the Sweetest in the Land (HMV)
- 1939 : My Yiddishe Mama (Ariola)
- 1939 : Resele (Victrola)
- 1939 : Meine mutter bleib in Ungarn (Victrola)
- 1947 : Wo Ahin Soll Ich Geh'n (Where can I Go)/Hebrew Chant with Orchestra Bruce Campbell and Wardour Singers (Decca). C'est son plus grand succès et le record des ventes. Plus de 7,800,000 exemplaires vendus
- 1947 : Pigalle/Homeland (with Orchestra Lew Stone) (Decca F 9187/Decca DR.13631)
- 1948 : Wus Geween Ist Geween/I Love You Much Too Much (with Tuschinsky Orch.) (Elite Spezial 9080)
- 1948 : Live at Tuschinsky (Telefunken)
- 1948 : A brivele der mamme/Der alter zigoiner (with Orchestra Lew Stone) (Saturne 1055)
- 1948 : Moshiah (with Orchestra) Guy Luypaerts (Saturne)
- 1951 : Oif'n Weg Steht A Boim (Saturne)
- 1952 : Misirlou (Vogue)
- 1952 : Glik (Tikva)
- 1952 : Der Alter Tsigayner (Tikva)
- 1952 : Bessarabien (with Orchestra Abe Ellstein) (Hed-Arzi)
- 1952 : A Sudenyu (Tikva)
- 1952 : Ikh Zing (Tikva)
- 1954 : In Concert (Ohel Shem Concert Hall, Tel Aviv) (Vogue LP85)
- 1954 : Der emigrant (Telefunken UX 4673)
- 1954 : You Got To Have A Little Mazl (Tikva)
- 1954 : Leo Fuld Sings Roumanische, Kretchme and other Yiddish Songs (Hataklit HI 25005)
- 1956 : Leo Fuld zingt (Telefunken)
- 1958 : Leo Fuld (with Martin Roman and his Orchestra) (Simcha Records JLP 2)
- 1959 : Poylish Yidl (Hataklit)
- 1960 : Zigany Melody (Tikva)
- 1965 : Rumaynisher Kretshme (Hataklit)
- 1967 : A Yiddische Momme/Recorded in 1967 (Artone MDS S - 3022)
- 1967 : Doina/Spiel Zigeuner (Artone)
- 1970 : A Yiddische Momme (Vogue HJV 119)
- 1972 : My Yiddische Mama (CBS)
- 1975 : Dat kleine beetje geluk op aarde (Europaclub)
- 1991 : Shalom Israel (Columbia)
- 1997 : God Zegen Nederland EP (c'est sa dernière chanson)
- 1997 : The Legend (c'est sa dernière album enregistrée) (Hippo Records 97002)
- 1999 : Leo Fuld (Sony BMG)
- 2002 : Shalom Israel (Sony BMG)
- 2002 : Slavia : le chant de l'Est (2 cd avec Leo Fuld) (Virgin)
- 2003 : Leo Fuld Greatest Hits (Sony BMG)
- 2005 : My Yiddishe mama (Artone)
- 2006 : Vi ahin sol ich gayn (Hatikvah)
- 2008 : The Legend - 10 ans Édition anniversaire (Hippo Records 97002)

== Documentaries ==
- 1993 The International Singing Star Leo Fuld(Netherlands TV) Screenwriter: Eveline van Dyck, Director of photography: Fred Mekenkamp, Director: Netty van Hoorn. Running time: 65 min. 16 mm film in a Dutch and English version. Distributed by Dutch Film Promotion Jan Luykenstraat 2, 107 ICM Amsterdam. In the mediatheek Jewish Historical Museum Amsterdam
- 1994 Ik Zing De Wereld Rond (Netherlands TV) Screenwriter: Leo Fuld, Director: Mohamed el-Fers. Running time: 60 min. S-VHS in Dutch version. Broadcast by MokumTV on the Amsterdam Salto Network. Broadcasttape with original material was lost at Salto, there is a VHS-copy in the mediatheek Jewish Historical Museum Amsterdam
- 1995 A YIDDISH X-MAS IN AMSTERDAM (Netherlands TV) With Leo Fuld and Daphne Meijer. Director: Mohamed el-Fers. Running time: 60 min. S-VHS in Dutch version. Broadcast by Salto Omroepstichting Amsterdam. In the Mediatheek Jewish Historical Museum Amsterdam
- 1996 THE LEGEND (TRAILER ONLY) Screenwriters: Leo Fuld, Mohamed el-Fers. Trailer for a MokumTV-serie with Berta van Laar, Levent Gemici, Zeki Güngör, Boris Yalçin and Leo Fuld. Running time: 6.56 min. S-VHS in Dutch with music The Legend composed by Kees Post. Broadcast by Salto Omroepstichting Amsterdam.
- 1997 LEO FULD IN KOPSPIJKERS (Netherlands TV) Final of VARA television Kopspijkers with Jack Spijkerman.
- 1997 FULD IN RAILAND (Netherlands TV) Netherlands 1997 Screenwriter/Director: Mohamed el-Fers. Running time: 60 min. S-VHS in Dutch version. Documentary about Leo Fuld and the Algerian musicgroup Railand. Broadcast by Salto Omroepstichting Amsterdam.
- 1997 THE KING OF YIDDISH MUSIC MEETS QUEEN BEATRIX (Netherlands TV) Screenwriter/Director: Mohamed el-Fers. Running time: 60 min. S-VHS in Dutch version. Broadcast by Salto Omroepstichting Amsterdam.
- 1997 OIF´M WEG STANT MAL A BOIM - GOODBYE LEO (Netherlands TV) Director: Mohamed el-Fers. Director of photography funeral Leo Fuld: Ria van Eck, Dick van der Geld. Running time: 60 min. S-VHS in Dutch version. Broadcast by Salto Omroepstichting Amsterdam.
