= Ben Bonus =

American actor and singer (1920–1984)

- בען באָנוס
- Born: Baruch Bonus; November 9, 1920; Horodenka, Poland
- Died: April 6, 1984 (aged 63); Miami, Florida, USA

Ben Bonus (Yiddish: בען באָנוס, November 9, 1920 – April 6, 1984) was a prominent American Yiddish theatre and Broadway actor and Yiddish language singer of the twentieth century. He and his wife Mina Bern were credited with keeping Yiddish theatre alive in United States during the 1960s and 1970s.

== Biography ==
=== Early life ===
Bonus was born as Baruch Bonus on November 9, 1920, in Horodenka, Stanisławów Voivodeship, Poland, which had until the end of the First World War been part of Galicia, Austria-Hungary. His parents were Meier Bonus and Sheyne Reyzl "Rosa" Katz. His father was a baker who later became a fruit seller. During this time he learned to sing with private lessons. He studied in Cheder until the age of 12 and then studied in the local Polish Gymnasium; during this time he began to perform in children's troupes. For a time he also apparently ran away from home to live in Lvov, singing in courtyards for money, and toured for a bit with Shtshogol's troupe before going home to finish his studies at the Gymnasium. Although his obituary in the New York Times as well as the Lexicon of Yiddish Theatre state that he was brought to the United States in 1929 by an aunt who visited Poland, this appears to be incorrect. He is listed as arriving in the United States in May 1938 on the Polish ship Piłsudski at age 17, under the care of his aunt Mary Schachter, who was a U.S. citizen. His aunt operated a successful bedding business in the Bronx. Bonus's parents and siblings were subsequently killed in the Holocaust in Horodenka.

=== Acting and musical career ===
Not long after arriving in the United States, Bonus performed with the Goldfaden Theatre (funded by the International Worker's Order), and started to give concerts and sing Yiddish songs on the radio with Arnold Jaffe. Apparently Bonus learned a lot from the actor Jacob Ben-Ami during this time. Herman Yablokoff also later said in his memoirs that he had been a theatre teacher to Bonus, and had been astonished by his voice at a young age. He also met his first wife, Pepie Bonus (née Sonnenreich) in an acting class; they married in 1940 and were listed in the census of that year as residing in the Bronx with Pepie's two brothers Morris and Jack. That year his first son was born.

In 1942 he joined the Ben Ami troupe in Detroit (managed by Abraham Littman) and performed the works of Peretz Hirschbein, Henrik Ibsen and Henri Bernstein, and subsequently did a nine-month tour with the Folksbiene in Los Angeles. During this time he also performed for the Jewish Workers' Committee and for the Histadrut. In 1945, Ben's second son Jack Bonus was born. He would go on to play as a session musician in the "Grateful Dead" scene. In 1946 Ben founded his own troupe, the "Yiddish Mobile Theater". The group was successful and toured over seventy cities.

He then returned to New York City and started acting in Vaudeville theatre there, including in Israel Rosenberg's theater on Clinton Street. In 1949 he became a member of the Yiddish Actors' Union. In that year he also met his future second wife, Mina Bern, while performing together in a show called "Shalom, Tel Aviv". They would end up performing and creating shows together for decades to come. Bonus would divorce his first wife Pepie in 1951 and remarry in 1952.

In 1952 he became co-manager of the National Yiddish Vaudeville Theatre in New York City with Henrietta Jacobson and Abraham Littman. In the late 1950s, he toured with an artist group funded by the Farbad-Labor Zionist Order, which included Bonus and Mina Bern, Lily Lilliano, Leon Liebgold and the pianist S. Fershko. The troupe continued to tour into the 1960s and a later version added the comedian Shmulik Goldstein and the pianist Paula Kadison. The group toured South America for a number of years as the Farband Players, visiting Chile, Bolivia, Ecuador, Brazil, Colombia, Argentina, and Venezuela.

It was only in 1964 that Bonus returned to New York City and started performing there regularly again. In 1966 he established a Yiddish language theater in the Borough Park Theater in Brooklyn. That same year he performed on Broadway with "Let's Sing Yiddish", a revue of various songs by Itsik Manger, Mordecai Gebirtig, Morris Rosenfeld and others, staged by Mina Bern. The following year he performed his act "Sing, Israel, Sing". In 1970 he performed "Light, Lively and Yiddish" on Broadway.

Bonus died unexpectedly on the street in Miami on April 6, 1984.

== Discography ==
- Songs of Our People (Tikva Records T-23) (1950s?)
- Ben Bonus Sings Israeli Songs in Yiddish - Sing Israel Sing! (Tikva Records T-125) (1960s?)
- Sing main Folk (Famous Records FAM-1017) (1960s?)
- Once Upon A Town - Cavalcade of Life in the Shtetl (Famous Records FAM-1021) (1970s?)
- Let's Sing Yiddish (with Mina Bern, Shmulik Goldstein, Bernard Sauer, and Diane Cypkin) (Roulette Records SR 42022)
- Ben Bonus (with Mina Bern) (Londisc RL 130) (1975?)
