= A Gesheft =

A Gesheft (The Deal)
- Directed by: Yakov Kirsh
- Produced by: Mendel Kirsh
- Edited by: Roland Millman
- Release date: 2005
- Running time: 90 minutes
- Country: United States
- Language: Yiddish
- Budget: $30,000

A Gesheft (Yiddish: א געשעפט, The Deal) is a 2005 action film, with a religious message, in the Yiddish language, made by Haredi Jews from Monsey, New York. It is the first film made by Haredi Jews entirely in Yiddish. (In Israel, there is somewhat of an Haredi film industry; the language of choice for these films is Israeli Hebrew, however.) It is one of very few Yiddish films made since the destruction of most Yiddish-speaking communities by the Nazis. The film has been marketed primarily to an Orthodox audience, not without some controversy. It has also drawn attention from less traditionalist Jews with an interest in Yiddish, since it is a document of contemporary spoken Yiddish. For example, it was screened at the 2006 Ashkenaz Festival in Toronto, a mostly secular celebration of klezmer music and Yiddish culture.

== Sources ==
- Gavriel Fiske (February 21, 2006). "A Rebirth for Yiddish Cinema". The Jerusalem Post.
- Anthony Weiss (February 24, 2006). "Trailblazing Yiddish Action Flick Makes Waves". The Forward.
- Shana Liebman (February 13, 2006). "Chooray for Chollywood!". New York Magazine.
