= The Dybbuk (film) =

1937 Yiddish-language Polish fantasy drama directed by Michał Waszyński

- Original Polish release poster
- Directed by: Michał Waszyński
- Written by: S. Ansky (play); S. A. Kacyzna (writer)
- Produced by: Zygfryd (or Zygmunt) Mayflauer
- Starring: Avrom Morewski; Ajzyk Samberg; Mojzesz Lipman
- Cinematography: Albert Wywerka
- Edited by: George Roland
- Music by: Henryk Kon
- Distributed by: Foreign Cinema Arts Inc.
- Release date: 26 September 1937
- Running time: 125 minutes (original); 108 minutes (USA); 123 minutes (existing print)
- Country: Poland
- Language: Yiddish

The Dybbuk (Yiddish: דער דיבוק, Der Dibuk; Polish: Dybuk) is a 1937 Yiddish-language Polish fantasy drama directed by Michał Waszyński and choreographed by Judith Berg. It is based on the play The Dybbuk by S. Ansky.

The Dybbuk, or Between Two Worlds (Yiddish: דער דיבוק, אדער צווישן צוויי וועלטן; Der Dibuk, oder Tsvishn Tsvey Veltn) is a 1914 play by S. Ansky, relating the story of a young bride possessed by a dybbuk – a malicious possessing spirit, believed to be the dislocated soul of a dead person – on the eve of her wedding. The Dybbuk is considered a seminal play in the history of Jewish theatre, and played an important role in the development of Yiddish theatre. The play was based on years of research by Ansky, who traveled between Jewish shtetls in Russia and Ukraine, documenting folk beliefs and stories of the Hassidic Jews.

The film, with some changes in the plot structure, starred Lili Liliana as Leah, Leon Liebgold as Hannan (Channon, in the English-language subtitles), and Abraham Morewski as Rabbi Azrael ben Hodos. The film adds an additional act before those in the original play: it shows the close friendship of Sender and Nisn as young men. Besides the language of the film itself, the picture is noted among film historians for the striking scene of Leah's wedding, which is shot in the style of German Expressionist cinema. The film is generally considered one of the finest in the Yiddish language. The Dybbuk was filmed on location in Kazimierz Dolny, Poland, and in Feniks Film Studio in Warsaw.

== Plot ==
Two best friends, Nisan and Sender, living in a shtetl in the Pale of Settlement, jointly vow that the children their wives are expecting will eventually marry, against the advice of a mysterious and sinister traveller who warns against binding future generations. Sender's wife dies giving birth to their daughter Leah, and Nisan drowns in a storm at the moment his wife gives birth to their son Chanan. Sender becomes a rich but miserly rabbi in the shtetl of Britnitz, and one day Chanan arrives there as a poor yeshiva student. With both men unaware of their connection, Sender offers Chanan hospitality. Leah and Chanan fall in love, but knowing that Sender will not agree to marriage because of his lack of wealth, Chanan obsessively studies the Kabbalah and attempts to practice magic to improve his position. When he hears that Sender has arranged Leah's marriage to a rich man's son, he calls on Satan to help him. He's struck dead, but returns as a dybbuk, a restless spirit, who possesses Leah. The ceremony is postponed, and Sender calls on the assistance of Ezeriel, a wise and powerful rabbi in nearby Miropol (Myropil). Ezeriel exorcises the dybbuk, but Leah offers her soul to Chanan and dies as the mysterious stranger blows out a candle and utters "baruch dayan emet."

== Cast ==
- Abraham Morewski as Rabbi Ezeriel ben Hodos
- Ajzyk Samberg as the Messenger
- Mojżesz Lipman as Sender Brynicer ben Henie
- Lili Liliana as Leah – Sender's daughter
- Leon Liebgold as Chanan ben Nisan
- Dina Halpern as Aunt Frade
- Maks Bożyk (also known as Max Bozyk) as Nute, Sender's friend
- M. Messinger as Menasze, the prospective groom
- Gerszon Lemberger as Nisan ben Rifke
- Samuel Bronecki (billed: S. Bronecki) as Nachman, Menasze's father
- Samuel Landau as Zalman, matchmaker
- Abraham Kurc as Michael
- Judith Berg as Dancer
- Symcha Fostel
- Zisze Kac as Mendel

== See also ==
- Yiddish cinema
- Cinema of Poland
