= Tevya (film) =

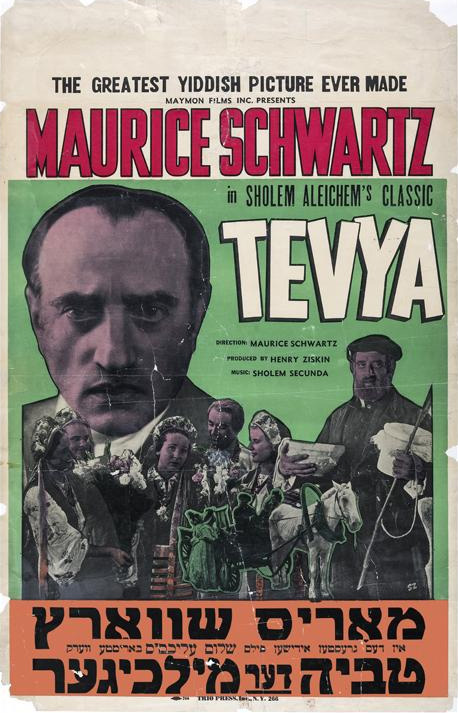
- Theatrical release poster in English and Yiddish
- Directed by: Maurice Schwartz
- Written by: Maurice Schwartz
- Produced by: Henry Ziskin
- Starring: Maurice Schwartz; Miriam Riselle; Rebecca Weintraub; Paula Lubelski
- Distributed by: Maymon Films Inc.
- Release date: December 21, 1939
- Running time: 93 minutes
- Country: United States
- Languages: Yiddish; Russian
- Budget: $70,000

Tevya is a 1939 American Yiddish film, based on author Sholem Aleichem's stock character Tevye the Dairyman, also the subject of the 1964 musical Fiddler on the Roof. It was the first non-English language picture selected for preservation by the National Film Registry.

== Plot ==
The story focuses primarily on Sholem Aleichem's stories "Chava" and "Lekh-Lekho (Get Thee Out)" but provides a definite ending rather than Sholom Aleichem's ambiguous ending. In this version of Tevya, as the Jews are expelled from their shtetl, Chava who previously converted to Christianity to marry, leaves her husband, returns to her family and to Judaism. It is felt that the antisemitism of the time influenced Schwartz to provide this ending.

== Cast ==
- Maurice Schwartz as Tevya
- Miriam Riselle as Chava
- Rebecca Weintraub as Golde
- Paula Lubelski as Tzeitel
- Leon Liebgold as Fedya
- Vicki Marcus as Shloimele
- Betty Marcus as Perele
- Julius Adler as Aleksei the Priest
- David Makarenko as Mikita
- Helen Grossman as Mikita's Wife
- Morris Strassberg as Starosta
- Al Harris as Zazuli
- Louis Weisberg as Shtarsina
- Boas Yound as Officer Uradnick

== Production ==
The script was adapted by Marcy Klauber and Schwartz from Sholem Aleichem's play based on his own book. Schwartz directed the film, which was based on two works by Schwartz from 1919: the silent film Broken Barriers (Khavah) and the stage production of Tevye.

The production was filmed at Biograph Studios in New York City and on a farm in Jericho, New York. Midway through the shooting of the film, Hitler seized Danzig on August 23, 1939, and a Nazi invasion of Poland was imminent. These and other events in Europe affected the actors, many of whom had family in Poland. The filming, however, was completed.

== Rediscovery ==
Long thought to be a lost film, a print was discovered in 1978. The same story was the basis of the 1964 stage musical Fiddler on the Roof and its 1971 film version, but the fate of Chava in the ending was changed for the change in attitudes by that time.

In 1991, Tevya was the first non-English language film to be named "culturally, historically, or aesthetically significant" by the U.S. Library of Congress and selected for preservation in the National Film Registry.

== See also ==
- List of rediscovered films
- 1939 in film
