= I've Got Me =

Studio album by Joanna Sternberg
- Released: June 30, 2023
- Studio: Strange Weather, Brooklyn, US
- Length: 32:34
- Label: Fat Possum
- Producer: Matt Sweeney

Joanna Sternberg chronology
Then I Try Some More (2019)	I've Got Me (2023)

I've Got Me is the second studio album by American musician Joanna Sternberg, released on June 30, 2023, through Fat Possum Records. It was produced by Matt Sweeney. The title track was released ahead of the album.

== Background ==
Prior to recording the album, Sternberg had a series of "both professional and personal" setbacks, and they felt taken advantage of by the music industry, which prompted them to address their mental health issues and "quit substances". They wrote the songs during the COVID-19 pandemic.

== Recording ==
Sternberg recorded the album with producer Matt Sweeney and engineer Daniel Schlett at the Strange Weather studio in Williamsburg, Brooklyn.

== Critical reception ==
Professional ratings
Aggregate scores
Source	Rating
Metacritic	85/100
Review scores
Source	Rating
AllMusic	4/5 stars
The Line of Best Fit	8/10
Paste	8.0/10
Pitchfork	8.6/10

I've Got Me received a score of 85 out of 100 on review aggregator Metacritic based on five critics' reviews, indicating "universal acclaim". Stereogum named it album of the week, with James Rettig writing that Sternberg's "compositions are becoming increasingly fleshed out" and although both "steadfast" and "ambitious", the album "still feels like a homespun affair", with Sternberg's voice "carr[ying] these songs. It's pillowy but also raw and aching, and it contains a kernel of a New Yorker's characteristic world weariness". Pitchfork designated it "Best New Music", with the site's Emma Madden stating that "Sternberg culls from a broader emotional range and an expanded musical vocabulary" on the album, which contains "singsong ditties and openhearted ballads [that] play like new standards" and "doesn't sound hushed or intimate. It's just there, present, as if something obvious suddenly revealed itself to you." John Amen of The Line of Best Fit felt that "Sternberg elaborates on the approaches and themes of their debut", calling their "perceptions and narration [...] as complex as ever, brimming with pop-psych allusions and peppery doses of ambivalence and satire". Amen concluded that "Sternberg's songs are readily accessible; then again, the talented musician and singer offers multilayered lyrics and works skillfully with vocal paradoxes".

Annie Parnell of Paste wrote that the songs "start simply, then bloom into playful complexity" as "Sternberg tracks a dogged healing process through twelve deeply reflective tracks". Parnell also felt that "the album's ordering feels acutely intentional: Grief is nonlinear, as is healing." AllMusic's Timothy Monger found that "the songs are sad, but also joyously robust and full of the conflicting emotions of simply being alive" and also stated that "Sternberg's quavering voice will not please everyone and their musical palette is delightfully out of step with the times, but their candor and warmth of character are universal."

Pitchfork ranked it the 34th best album of 2023.

== Track listing ==
All tracks are written by Joanna Sternberg.

I've Got Me track listing
No.	Title	Length
1.	"I've Got Me"	2:16
2.	"I Will Be with You"	2:14
3.	"People Are Toys to You"	2:43
4.	"Drifting on a Cloud"	2:35
5.	"Mountains High"	2:59
6.	"I'll Make You Mine"	3:08
7.	"Stockholm Syndrome"	2:29
8.	"Right Here"	2:11
9.	"The Love I Give"	2:05
10.	"She Dreams"	3:29
11.	"The Human Magnet Song"	1:45
12.	"The Song"	4:40
Total length:		32:34
