= Leon Liebgold =

American actor

Leon Liebgold (July 31, 1910, Kraków – September 3, 1993, New Hope, Pennsylvania) was an actor in the Yiddish theatre and in Yiddish language films, both in his native Poland and later in the United States, to which he emigrated. Liebgold is best known for his roles in The Dybbuk (1937), made in Poland, and Tevya (1939), a U.S. production. He was also featured in the highly successful 1936 film Yidl Mit'n Fidl with Molly Picon.

== Early life and family ==
Liebgold was born in Kraków, then located in Austrian Galicia, to Yiddish theatre actors Zalman and Przemyśl-born Basha (née Sauber) Liebgold. He had a younger sister Toni and a younger brother Jan. Leon (Yiddish name Leib) began his career as a vaudeville performer and actor on stages in Poland. His father Zalman, a Kraków native, was the manager of the Kraków Yiddish Theatre, and as a boy, Leon appeared in his father's productions. In 1928, he joined the Vilna Troupe, appearing with them until 1933.

== Marriage and World War II ==
He married his frequent co-star, Lili Liliana (1913-1989), also rendered in English as "Lily" or "Lilly," in 1935. After completing The Dybbuk, Liebgold and Liliana left Poland with their troupe, "Di Yidishe Bande," for a world tour, appearing in Lithuania, Latvia, Belgium, and France. In 1939, when World War II broke out, they were in the United States, thus fortuitously escaping the Holocaust.

Liebgold served in the United States Army as a sergeant during World War II. During the war, Liebgold's parents and sister were imprisoned in the Tarnów Ghetto, and from there deported to the Treblinka death camp and murdered. His brother Jan survived numerous Nazi concentration camps, including Pustków, Auschwitz, and Gleiwitz III, as well as surviving a death march to Theresienstadt, where he was liberated by the Red Army. In 1946, Leon sponsored his brother to join him in America.

== Career in America ==
Leon then performed as a stage actor in Yiddish theaters in America for decades, including the Folksbiene Theater. He and Liliana also toured South America in the 1950s. In the late 1970s, he served as president of the Hebrew Actors' Union in Manhattan, New York.

Liebgold possessed both a resonant and fine melodic, cantorial-type voice which embellished both his speaking and singing on stage.

== Death ==
Liebgold died in 1993 at age 83. He and Liliana, married nearly 60 years until she predeceased him in 1989, are buried together at Mount Hebron Cemetery, in Queens, New York.
