= Durkh trern =

1928 comedy-drama film

Durkh trern (Yiddish: דורך טרערן, Ukrainian: «Крізь сльози», lit. 'Through Tears'), was a 1928 Soviet silent black and white comedy-drama film shot at the All-Ukrainian Photo Cinema Administration, directed by Grigory Gricher. It was based on stories The Bewitched Tailor and Motl, Peysi the Cantor's Son. It was sold to the United States, Russian subtitles removed and voice-over in Yiddish added by "Worldkino Corporation", with music by Sholom Secunda and occasional English subtitles added, and played there under the title Laughter Through Tears in 1933. Both 32 mm film versions were lost, only a 16 mm version was found and digitally restored by the National Center for Jewish Film in 1991. Sholem Aleichem's stories are overlaid with a lyrical line and failed attempts of the younger generation to plot "get rich quick" schemes.

== Plot ==
The 1933 American version of the film begins with an insert of Sholem Aleichem (not really) reading from a book the beginning of The Bewitched Tailor. This follows with a brief presentation of major characters: Shimmen-Eyle (Schimin-Elli) the tailor from a small shtetl of Zlodeyevke, his wife Tzippe Beyle, their daughter Bruche, Bruche's beau Elye (Eli), Pinye the Brain, Motele the orphan, Motele's melamed, tavern keeper Dyodie, shtetl tsirulnik (barber; barbers were commonly acting as doctors; he was called "Zlodeyevke professor"), and "the main character, the goat". The next scene is from tailor's family life, with numerous children.

Next is the scene of Elie arriving from a town. His belle Bruche sees him coming in the window, pretties up and sneaks out to meet Elli. A lyrical scene follows, into which the Yiddish narrator sneaks in a Russian expression: "Lyubov ne kartoshka" ["Love is not potatoes"]. Elli tells Bruche how hard it is to live in a city and a flashback follows, in which he reads a letter signed "Your Brucha" at his work place, bookbinder's, and at this moment police knocks in ("Open the door, you, zhidovskaya morda [ kike-snout ]!"), in search of illegal literature, finds some (a brochure What Poalei Zion Wants), and the shop is closed... After the flashback Elli proposes Bruche, however, Shimen-Elli does not like the idea of a poor suitor, neither does Tzippe Beyle.

The next scene, an old cantor (father of Eli) dies while singing his last song, leaving Motele orphan. Poor mother passes Motele to a boarding cheder, full of mischievous kids under a strict melamed, equally mischievous Motele gets into a trouble, and runs away, home. (From now on, scenes from three plot lines interleave.) Meanwhile, at home, Eli, Pinye the Brain, and Brucha come up with the idea how to become millionaires: they scrap together their kopecks and order the book titled How to Earn 100 Roubles a Month. At the same time, "for no good reason, Tzippi Beyle decides she wants a goat", and here enter the events described in The Bewitched Tailor (with variations): Shimmen-Eyle goes to buy a goat from Motele's melamed ... and there is nothing from Motl, Peysi the Cantor's Son besides the name of the orphaned boy... Overwhelmed with the "goat-switching" trick played on him by the tavernkeeper, Schimen-Elli gets crazy, but gets healed by a tsirulnik. Shtetl people, realizing the trick played on the tailor, laugh at him, but then decide to bring a retribution onto the tavern-keeper. The ensuing riot, repeatedly called "revolution", was with not much success.

The "get rich quick" idea gets botched (following the book, they manufacture and sell cider, (Note: English surces call the drink "cider", but in the original it was kvass, a traditional East Slavic beverage.) but Pinye messes with the recipe, and their second enterprise was to cell... ink). As a side effect, the overcoat of the local policemaster becomes ink-blotted, and the angry policemaster makes the whole family expelled from the shtetl, incriminating him "the incitement of a riot". On the way out the tailor manages to quickly mend a damaged uniform of some big boss, it becomes realized that a good tailor is needed after all, and the caravan of expellees turns around to go back home.

== Commentary ==
In the 1928 Soviet original, tailor's name was Perchik (a diminutive of Peretz) and his daughter was Frida. The tavern was not "exactly midway" between Zlodeyevke and Kozodoyevke, as Sholem Aleichem wrote, but in Kozodoyevke (the location of Motele's cheder, whose melamed sold the goat to Perchik/Shimmen-Eyle in the film).

Jeremy Dauber notes that the film was both an artistic and political success in the Soviet Union, adding a proper ideological twist to the content. The macabre story of the tailor eventually transforms into a class war of poor against rich (in this case against the rich tavern-keeper) and Motele, throwing a lump of mud in the tavern-keeper's eye, becomes the symbol of revolution.
