= Then I Try Some More =

Studio album by Joanna Sternberg
- Released: July 12, 2019
- Genre: Lo-fi; blues; jazz; pop
- Length: 25:51
- Label: Fat Possum
- Producer: Joanna Sternberg; Joe Rogers

Joanna Sternberg chronology
Then I Try Some More (2019)	I've Got Me (2023)

Then I Try Some More is the debut studio album by American musician Joanna Sternberg, released on April 9, 2019, through Conor Oberst's label Team Love Records, preceding a tour with Oberst. It was re-released in 2021 by Fat Possum Records. "This Is Not Who I Want to Be", "For You" and "Step Away" were released ahead of the album. In 2023, Rolling Stone described the album as a "word-of-mouth cult favorite".

== Critical reception ==
Professional ratings
Review scores
Source	Rating
Exclaim!	7/10
Pitchfork	7.5/10
The Fader	Positive

Emma Madden of Pitchfork wrote that Sternberg "manages to endow their music with pathos rather than preciousness" and "with themes of suicidal ideation, abject hopelessness, and self-hatred, Sternberg's debut can be a challenging listen. For those who aren't dogged by similar feelings, it may be forbidding, but for those who are able to identify with Sternberg, Then I Try Some More has the potential to be life-savingly relatable". Kaitlin Ruether of Exclaim! felt that the album "conceals no raw nerves—everything is placed on the line" and "listening to Joanna Sternberg is like listening to a close friend confess insecurities and experiences. Trust feels implicit, as Sternberg's gentle vocals reach out for connection". Ruether elaborated that "the majority of the songs on Then I Try Some More are melancholic, with a strong dose of self-deprecation" and concluded that "the record leaves you feeling as though you have experienced something intimate and infinitely human".

James Rettig of Stereogum opined that the album is "sometimes hard to take in all at once, but Sternberg offsets that with arrangements that sound playful and inviting, soft keys and a voice that soothes in the face despite all that sadness within". Jonathan Bernstein of Rolling Stone characterized the album as a "gorgeous bedroom lo-fi rendering of mid-century blues, jazz, and pop (Sternberg is a huge Scott Joplin fan) that carves out a middle ground between Daniel Johnson [sic] and Randy Newman" and called Sternberg "a relentlessly studious songwriter with a sharp sense of how to use phrasing to advance the song they're singing".

== Track listing ==
All tracks are written by Joanna Sternberg.

Then I Try Some More track listing
No.	Title	Length
1.	"This Is Not Who I Want to Be"	3:32
2.	"Step Away"	2:49
3.	"My Angel"	2:24
4.	"For You"	2:07
5.	"Pimba"	2:55
6.	"Nothing Makes My Heart Sing"	3:04
7.	"Trying to Say No"	2:33
8.	"You Have Something Special"	3:26
9.	"Don't You Ever"	3:01
Total length:		25:51
