= Tikva Records =

Jewish American record label

Tikva Records was a Jewish American record label which was operated by Allen B. Jacobs in Manhattan from the 1940s to the 1970s, releasing around 170 LPs of Jewish music and audiobooks.

== History ==
Allen B. Jacobs, who had previously run other record labels, started Tikva Records around 1947 as a budget label; he recorded the albums cheaply, designed the covers and mixed the music himself, for the most part.

The label released many kinds of Jewish music. It released religious Jewish music by singers such as David Kusevitsky and the Malavsky Family, Israeli music by Jo Amar and Tova Ben Zvi, klezmer music by Dave Tarras and Marty Levitt, Yiddish singers such as Leo Fuld, Ben Bonus and Martha Schlamme, Hasidic music, spoken word, and many more eclectic or unknown artists. Most of these releases have been archived on such sites as Florida Atlantic University's Judaic Collection or the Dartmouth Jewish Sound Archive

The eventual end of Tikva Records is poorly documented. A member of the Idelsohn Society for Musical Preservation who researched its history said he believes the original masters and records were all destroyed after a shady deal by Jacobs.

In 2011, the Idelsohn Society released a compilation of Tikva Records materials titled Songs for the Jewish-American Jet Set: The Tikva Records Story 1950-1973. To promote the release, they recreated a pop-up shop on Mission Street, San Francisco, in which they recreated a 1960s-style record store filled with Tikva Records LPs.
