= Bernard Sauer =

Bernard Sauer (1924 – February 13, 1991) was an American stage actor, most prominently starring in Yiddish theater during the 1960s and 70s.

Sauer was born into a family of six in Buenos Aires, Argentina, and studied acting there before making his theatrical debut in the 1945 play, Yoshke, the Musician directed by Joseph Buloff. By the mid-1960s, Sauer had begun appearing on Broadway where he co-starred with Ben Bonus in the 1966 play Let's Sing Yiddish. He went on to appear in Sing Israel Sing (1967) and Light, Lively and Yiddish (1970).

In 1971, he toured with a Yiddish repertory company performing at the Anderson Theater in Manhattan. Sauer went into semi-retirement during the 1980s, although he worked behind the scenes on the 1985 musical "A Match Made in Heaven". He served as a board member of the Yiddish Theatrical Alliance as well as the president of the Hebrew Actors' Union from 1986 until his death. He died in New York from a heart attack on February 13, 1991, aged 67.
