= Florence Weiss =

American actor and singer

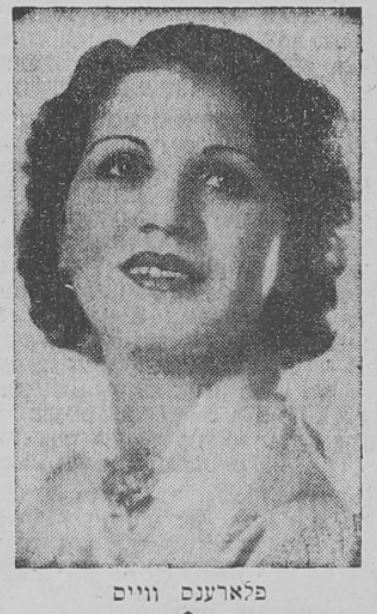
Florence Weiss

Florence Weiss (Yiddish: פֿלאָרענס װײס, c. 1900–1974) was a Russian-born American Yiddish theatre, Vaudeville and film actor, recording artist, and soprano who was active from the 1920s to the 1960s. She worked and performed with such artists as Moishe Oysher, Alexander Olshanetsky, Boris Thomashefsky, Fyvush Finkel, and Abe Ellstein. The height of her popularity was during the 1930s, when she often toured and performed with her then-husband, Moishe Oysher, and appeared in three Yiddish-language films with him: The Cantor's Son, The Singing Blacksmith, and Overture to Glory.

== Biography ==
=== Early life ===
Florence Weiss's year of birth and immigration is unclear. She Her date and place of birth may have been on May 30, 1900 in Makhnivka, Kiev Governorate, Russian Empire, as per her Declaration of Intention to become a United States citizen. However, in other documents, including travel manifests, the birth year was cited as 1899. At least one census indicated a year as late as 1904, which strains credulity. She apparently emigrated to the United States via Baltimore in 1907.

=== Career ===
Her first husband was Louis Weiss, a fellow Russian-born Yiddish Theatre actor. In 1920, they were living in Baltimore.

By 1928, Florence was the leading actress at the Lyric theatre, often costarring with Louis, as well as at the Hopkinson theatre which Louis managed. In 1928, Louis recruited actor Moishe Oysher from Philadelphia to star opposite Florence in a play. However, Florence ended up leaving Louis for Oysher, and married Oysher in January 1929 while they were living in Newark, New Jersey and working at the Lyric Theatre. They continued performing at the Lyric in 1930. By 1931, they had relocated to Philadelphia. But they soon returned to New York, playing in a Boris Thomashefsky operetta at the Gayety Theatre in 1932 and at the Amphion Theatre in 1933.

Although they later became very well known, at first they had difficult making ends meet with the theatre, which is why Oysher decided to become a Hazzan as well. The pair appeared regularly together on WEVD radio during the 1930s. In 1935 she and Oysher returned to the Lyric Theatre, Second Avenue Theatre, and the Hopkinson Theatre, and at the Second Avenue theatre in 1936 in an Alexander Olshanetsky operetta starring Leo Fuchs.

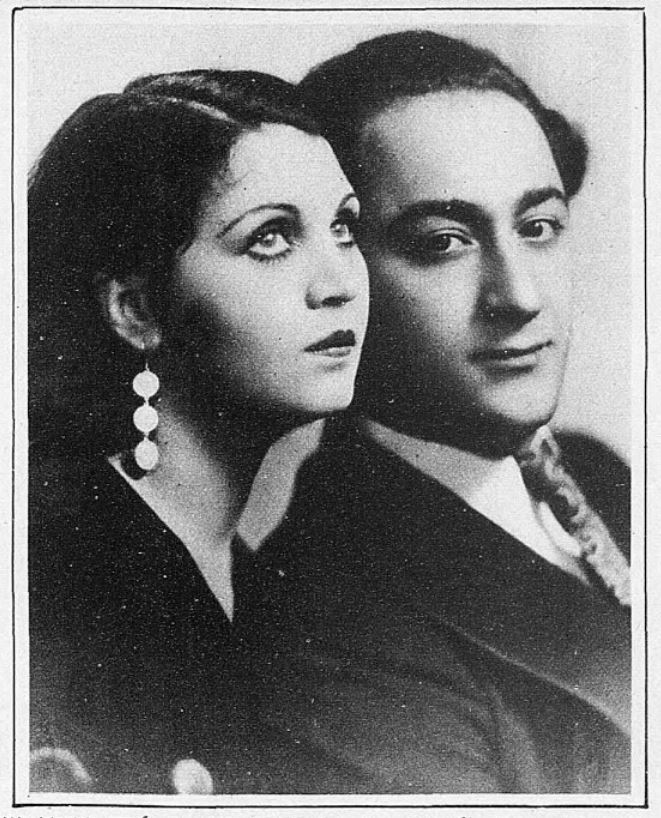
Weiss with her second husband, Moishe Oysher, c.1933

The height of Weiss's fame was in the late 1930s, when she appeared in a handful of films with Oysher, which led to radio appearances, recording sessions and larger concert appearances. In 1937 she appeared in Sidney Goldin's final film, The Cantor's Son (Dem khazn's zindl), a film loosely based on Moishe Oysher's own life story. Goldin died while the film was still in production and a relatively unknown director, Ilya Moteleff, stepped in to finish it. They then appeared at the Brooklyn Academy of Music in February 1937 to an audience of 2000. Her next appearance was in The Singing Blacksmith (Yankl der shmid, 1938), again with Moishe Oysher, which was directed by Edgar G. Ulmer and based on a 1906 play by David Pinski. The film was successful enough that Victor Records had Oysher and Weiss record their songs from it to be released on disc. In 1939 she also returned to the Hopkinson theatre for a time. Their third and final film together was Overture to Glory (Der vilner shtot khazn, 1940), which was directed by Max Nosseck, based on a story by Ossip Dimov.

In 1940 she was in a play starring Aaron Lebedeff and the Barry Sisters at the Clinton Theatre and appeared regularly in a Vaudeville act with Lebedeff and Celia Adler at the Downtown National Theatre.

She continued to appear on stage during and after World War II. In 1944 she appeared with Lillian Lux and Pesach Burstein at the Hopkinson Theatre. She appeared at the Clinton Theatre in 1947. She also took on a regular opening act role at a Romanian-Jewish restaurant on Broadway, Roumanian Village.

From 1949 to the mid-1950s, she appeared in a number of productions with Irving Jacobson, Fyvush Finkel, Max Kletter and others at Vera Rozanka's National Theatre. By the late 1950s and 1960s, most of her performances seem to have been at Borscht Belt hotels in the Catskills.

She died in May 1974, after a long illness.

== Selected recordings ==
- A zemerl/Chassidic in America with Moishe Oysher (Victor Records, 1938)
- Simmon-Tov Mazeltov/Bist Mere Mazeldig with Abe Ellstein orchestra (Banner Records)

== Film appearances ==
- The Cantor's Son (Dem khazn's zindl, 1937) with Moishe Oysher, directed by Sidney Goldin and Ilya Matyleff
- The Singing Blacksmith (Yankl der shmid, also known as Der zingedike shmid, 1938) with Moishe Oysher, directed by Edgar G. Ulmer
- Overture to Glory (Der vilner shtot khazn, 1940) with Moishe Oysher, directed by Max Nosseck
