= Mina Bern =

American actress (1911–2010)

- Born: Mina Bernholtz; May 5, 1911; Bielsk Podlaski, Grodno Governorate, Russian Empire
- Died: January 10, 2010 (aged 98)
- Known for: Yiddish theater
- Awards: Obie Award

Mina Bern (May 5, 1911 – January 10, 2010) was a Polish and American actress. She was a star of the Yiddish theater.

== Life ==
Mina Bernholtz was born in Bielsk Podlaski in the Grodno Governorate of the Russian Empire (now Poland). Her theatrical debut was in Białystok under the director Yehuda Greenhoyz. In 1930, through her relative Moishe Broderzon, she shortened her name and auditioned successfully to join the Ararat Yiddish cabaret theater in Łódź, and then played at the Warsaw Scala and later, the Kaminska theaters and the local folk theater. With Dina Halperin and Sam Bronetski she worked in the collective Our Theater, and later with Zygmunt Turkov. A few years later, she established a small cabaret theater in Białystok.

Bern fled to Russia with her daughter after the Nazi invasion of Poland; there she played with the "Bialistocker yidisher miniatur-teatr" (miniature revi-teater) of Shimon Dzigan and Israel Shumacher. In 1944 she was sent to a camp in Uganda where she did children's theater for Poles stationed there. Through Jewish family connections she went to Kenya in 1945 and from there in 1947 to Mandatory Palestine where she worked with Jenny Lavitz in the revue Rozhinkes mit mandlen, favorably reviewed and subsequently staged at the Hebrew Li-La-Lo revue theater. In 1949, after an incident in which she was accused of sending a thug to beat up theater critic Haim Gamzu, who had written a bad review of her performance, she emigrated to the United States. She married actor and producer Ben Bonus. Living in New York City, she and her husband operated the Village Theater, which ran Yiddish performances. She recorded songs in Hebrew.

She died in 2010, and was buried at Mount Hebron Cemetery in Flushing, Queens.

== Awards ==
Bern received an Obie Award in 1999, for her performance in Sweet Dreams (Zise khaloymes), at the Folksbiene.

== Filmography ==
- Brooklyn Babylon (2001) .... Nanna
- Flawless (1999) .... Mrs. Spivak
- Celebrity (1998) .... Elderly Homeowner
- The First Seven Years (1998) (TV) .... Landlady
- I'm Not Rappaport (1996)
- Everything Relative (1996) .... Grandma Kessler
- Little Odessa (1994) .... Grandma Tsilya
- It Could Happen to You (1994) .... Muriel's Neighbour
- Pressure Drop (1994) .... Ida Potashner
- Avalon (1990) .... Alice Krichinsky
- Crossing Delancey (1988) .... Would-be Victim
- Tenement (1985) (as Mina Bern Bonas) .... Ruth

== See also ==
- Music of Israel
- Shoshana Damari
