= Jakob Jonilowicz =

Israeli cinematographer (1908–1975)

- יעקב יונילוביץ
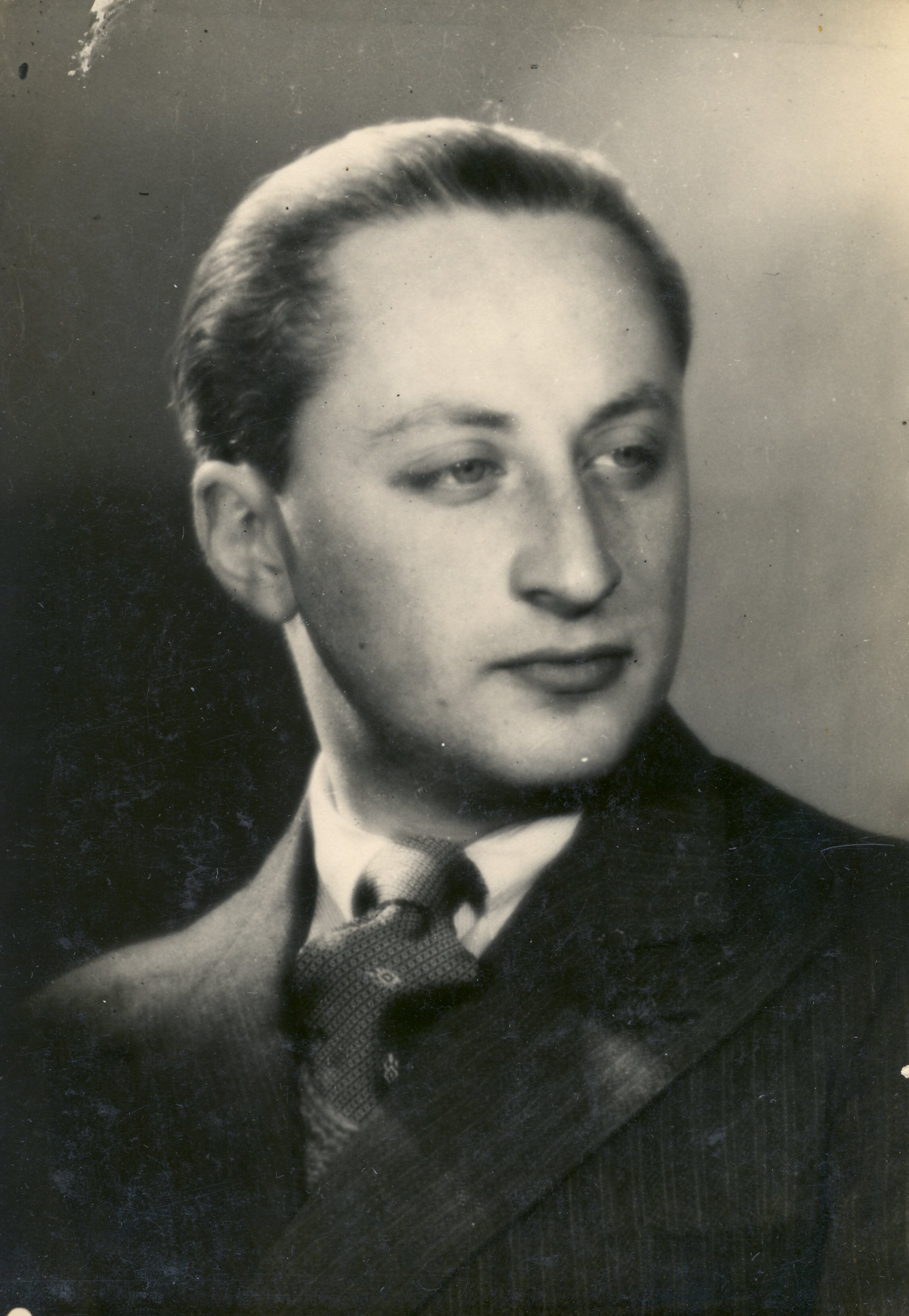
- Born: 1908; Vilnius, Russian Empire
- Died: 1975 (aged 66–67); Israel
- Occupation: Cinematographer

Jakob Jonilowicz (Hebrew: יעקב יונילוביץ; 1908–1975) was an Israeli cinematographer.

Jonilowicz was born in Vilna (later Vilnius), Russian Empire. He studied cinematography in Paris.

In 1936 he was the director of photography for the film Yidl Mitn Fidl, Yiddle with his Fiddle.

After the 1939 German invasion of Poland, Jonilowicz returned to his hometown to help his family. After he survived the Holocaust, he was director of photography for Long Is the Road, a German film made in 1947 and 1948. Later he moved to Israel.

Jonilowicz was cinematographer on the following films:

- Tent City – Ir Ha’ohalim, Israel, 1951
- Et La Noce Dansait presented in Cannes Film Festival, 1952
- Break of Day, Israel, 1952–1953
- Transition, US, 1954

In 1961 in Jerusalem, he filmed the trial of Nazi war criminal Adolf Eichmann.

Jonilowicz was married to Dolly Kobryner Jonilowicz, a New York-born film editor who was killed by Germans in occupied Poland during World War II. In 1953, he and his second wife, Hanna, had a daughter in Israel, Tali.

Jonilowicz died in Israel in 1975.

== Der Wilner Express ==
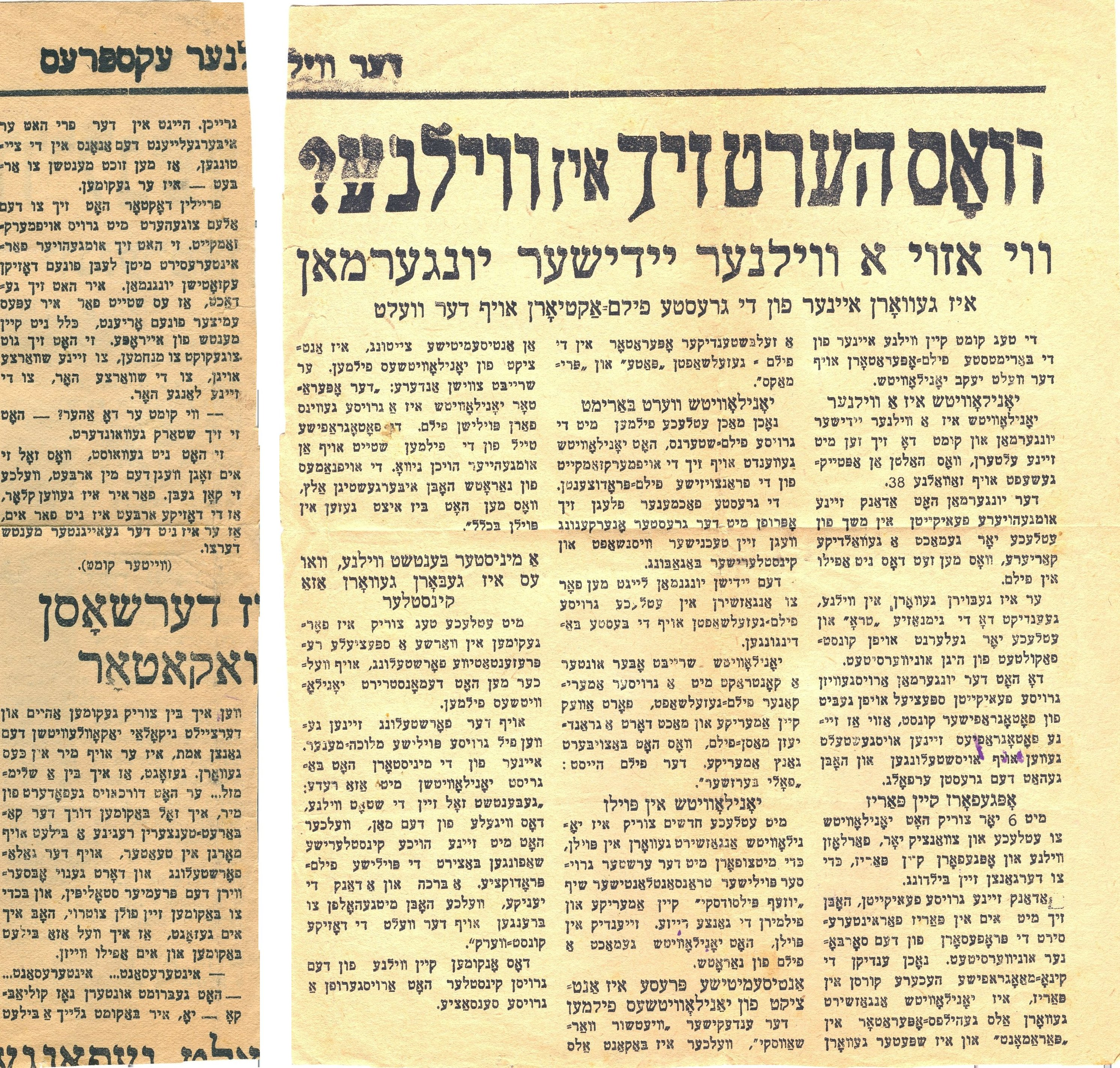

An article published in Vilna, 1936, in the Der Wilner Ekspres (Der Wilner Express) detailed Jakob Jonilowicz' childhood and life before World War II.
