= Marilyn Michaels =

American singer (born 1943)

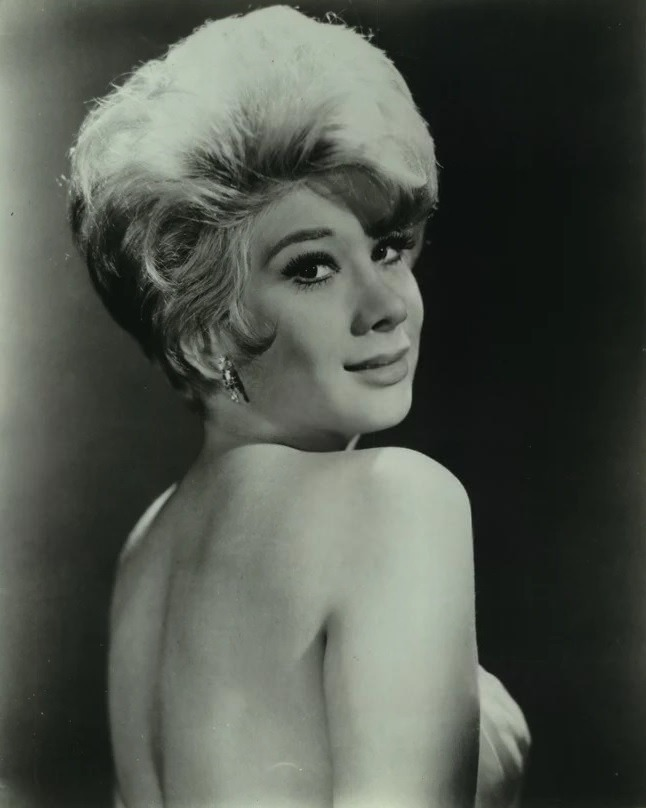
- Michaels in 1968

Background information
- Born: Marilyn Sternberg; February 26, 1943 (age 83); New York City
- Genres: Pop, standards, jazz, classical, comedy, acting, dialectician
- Occupations: Singer, comedian, writer
- Labels: Debbie Records, Warner Bros. Records, ABC Paramount,
- Website: Marilyn Michaels.com

Marilyn Michaels (born Marilyn Sternberg, February 26, 1943) is a comedian, singer, actress, impressionist, author, and composer.

== Family ==
Marilyn Michaels was born in Manhattan to Russian Jewish émigré parents. Her mother was cantoress and actress Fraydele Oysher and her father was Harold Sternberg, a senior basso with the Metropolitan Opera for 37 years. Cantor and film actor Moishe Oysher was her uncle.

Michaels began performing with her mother at age 7 on the Yiddish stage and throughout Canada. At 14, she was soloist in her father and uncle's choir, and also sang duets with Oysher on the classic recording, "Moishe Oysher's Chanukah Party".

She attended the High School of Music & Art as a music major, but switched to Art in her sophomore year. While still in high school, she was signed to Debbie Records, headed by Ray Rainwater (brother of Marvin Rainwater) and her first single, "Johnny Where Are You," was produced by Phil Ramone. This was followed by a recording contract with RCA Victor record producers Hugo and Luigi, for which she sang "Tell Tommy I Miss Him" — the answer-song to the hit "Tell Laura I Love Her" — by Ray Peterson. She recorded both U.S. and UK versions. She later recorded for Warner Brothers and ABC Paramount and appeared on The Ed Sullivan Show, The Hollywood Palace, The Jackie Gleason American Scene Magazine and NBC's Hullabaloo, with Sammy Davis Jr. She appeared with Davis again on The Name of the Game, The Flip Wilson Show, and Sammy in Acapulco.

== Funny Girl, Kopykats, and Playboy ==
In 1965, after signing with ABC Paramount and starring at New York's Copacabana, as well as Las Vegas and London, Michaels starred for a year as Fanny Brice in the National Company of Funny Girl. She reprised the role six months after the year-long run ended when Carol Lawrence was injured before her turn as Fanny at the Westbury Music Fair in Long Island, New York.

During Funny Girl, Marilyn made appearances on The Dean Martin Show and The Red Skelton Show, The Tonight Show with Johnny Carson, and The Jonathan Winters Show. In 1973 she starred as the only female performer in the Emmy-nominated comedy series The Kopykats for ABC's Kraft Music Hall (Smith Hemion Productions). Michaels later starred with Rich Little in a 1981 TV commercial for the Diet 7 Up Campaign, "Look Who's Turning Diet 7 Up".

She appeared in a Playboy pictorial for Playboy as Bette Midler, Bo Derek, Julie Andrews, Barbra Streisand, Donna Summer, Lily Tomlin, and Brooke Shields. She reprised some of these characters while working with Debbie Reynolds on The Love Boat in 1982. In that year, Woody Allen also cast her in a cameo as 1930s film star Mae West in Zelig. When Allen decided to cut the piece, preferring documentary footage to an impression, Marilyn wrote of her experience working with Allen, including photos showing her dressed in Woody's garb, for US Weekly.

In 1983, she performed five voices for the PBS series Reading Rainbow for the book "Gregory the Terrible Eater", and was all the voices for the satire audio book, "Frankly Scarlett, I Do Give a Damn!"

== Catskills on Broadway—Present ==
Marilyn made her Broadway debut at the Lunt-Fontanne Theatre in the original cast of Catskills on Broadway, which won the Outer Circle Critics Award for Best Comedy. She performed in her own revue, Broadway Ballyhoo, at Harrah's in Atlantic City, and was the host of the radio show The Broadway Hour on WEVD-AM New York. She has written two articles for The New York Times regarding the proposed revival of Funny Girl, and has composed the score, as well as co-written the libretto, to a new musical comedy, Alysha, with son Mark Wilk.

== Personal life ==
On October 5, 2008, Michaels married her third husband, Steven Portnoff, in her Upper West Side apartment.

She was previously married to Isaac Ribatzky from 1968 to 1970.

== Discography ==
- The Moishe Oysher Chanukah Party (1957)
- Johnny Where Are You (1959)
- Tell Tommy I Miss Him (single, 1960)
- Danny (single, '60)
- Past the Age of Innocence (single, '60)
- Fraydele Oysher and Her Daughter Marilyn: Yiddish Soul (1961)
- Marilyn Michaels, The Fantastic and Exciting Debut 1963
- Don’t Count The Days (Bacharach/David single, 1967)
- Macarthur Park (single, 1967)
- My Red Riding Hood (single, '67)
- I’m Naïve ('67 single, from The Dangerous Christmas of Red Riding Hood)
- The Times They Are A Changin ('67)
- I Wonder Who’s Kissing Her Now ('67 Single)
- Voices (1983)
- A Mother’s Voice (1998)
- The Oysher Heritage: Moishe Oysher, Fraydele Oysher (2005)
- Wonderful At Last (2008)

== Filmography ==
- New Faces (1964)
- The Jackie Gleason Show (1964)
- On Broadway Tonight (1964)
- The Mike Douglas Show (1964)
- The Ed Sullivan Show (1964)
- Hullabaloo (1965)
- The Dean Martin Show (1967)
- The Red Skelton Show (1967)
- Snap Judgment (1967)
- The Joey Bishop Show (1967)
- The Tonight Show, Johnny Carson (1967)
- The Jonathan Winters Show (1968)
- The Dating Game (1968)
- Operation Entertainment (1968)
- The Name of the Game (1970)
- The Engelbert Humperdinck Show (1970)
- The David Frost Show (1972)
- The Hollywood Squares (1972)
- The Flip Wilson Show (1972)
- The Kopykats (1973)
- Ed Sullivan On Broadway (1973)
- The George Kirby Show (1974)
- Stand Up and Cheer (1974)
- What's A Nice Country Like You... (1974)
- Wide World of Entertainment Special w/ Alan King (1974)
- Saturday Night Live/Howard Cosell (1975)
- The Dinah Shore Show (1975)
- The Bobby Vinton Show (1975)
- Sammy & Co. in Acapulco (1976)
- The Mike Douglas Christmas Special (1977)
- Fantasy Island "Rock Stars" (1979)
- Macy's Thanksgiving Day Parade (1980)
- The Diet 7UP Campaign (1981)
- The Alan Thicke Show (1981)
- The Tomorrow Show w/ Tom Snyder (1981)
- The Breakfast Connection (1981)
- Regis Morning Show (1981)
- The John Davidson Show (1981)
- TV Guide Salute to the 80's (1981)
- Live at Five (1981)
- Good Morning New York (1981)
- The Love Boat (1982)
- The Merv Griffin Show (1982)
- US Magazine Awards (1982)
- Tribute to the 30s (Donald O'Connor) (1982)
- 4th Annual Cheerleading Championship (1982)
- PM Magazine (1982)
- The Norm Crosby Show (1983)
- Tattletales (1983)
- Tribute to the Olympics (1983)
- Nightwatch (1983)
- The Joan Lunden Show (1983)
- Regis and Kathie Lee (1983/2000)
- NBC News at Five with Tom Snyder (1983)
- Lifestyles of the Rich and Famous (1984)
- On Stage America (1984)
- People's Choice Awards (1984)
- Match Game/Hollywood Squares (1984)
- The Robert Morley Show (1985)
- The Ruth Westheimer Show (1985)
- The New Hollywood Squares (1987)
- The Steve Allen Show (1987)
- Word Play (1987)
- The Robert Klein Show (1987)
- The Tomorrow Show (1987)
- One Life to Live (1988)
- People Are Talking (1988)
- Reading Rainbow- "Gregory the Terrible Eater" (1988)
- CNBC Talk Live/Beverly Sills (1990)
- Comedy Central/Jon Stewart (1990)
- The Howard Stern Show (1990/1991/1996)
- The Maury Povich Show (1991)
- The Paul Provenza Show (1992)
- WLIW Award in Excellence (1997)
- Women in Comedy (1998)
- E! Channel Celebrity Homes (2000)
- Sally Jesse Raphael (2000)
- The Joan Rivers Show (2000)
- Ticket (2001/2005)
- Profiles (2018)
- Good Day New York (2018)
- WPIX News (2018)
