= Haredi cinema =

Haredi cinema (Hebrew: קולנוע חרדי) is a form of film production by Haredi Jews in Israel from the late 20th century. Due to gender segregation in the Haredi community, Haredi film production and viewing are segregated as well. Women's cinematic productions are often displayed in private venues while men's productions are often circulated on video cassettes and discs.

The term "Haredi cinema" refers specifically to films produced by Haredi Jews for the Haredi audience, as opposed to films made within the community for other communities. The word 'fear,' in reference to Haredi Jews, refers to the fear of God—the Almighty—as the supreme power, and it signifies humility and reverence.
