= Moishe Oysher =

American singer

- Yiddish: משה אוישער
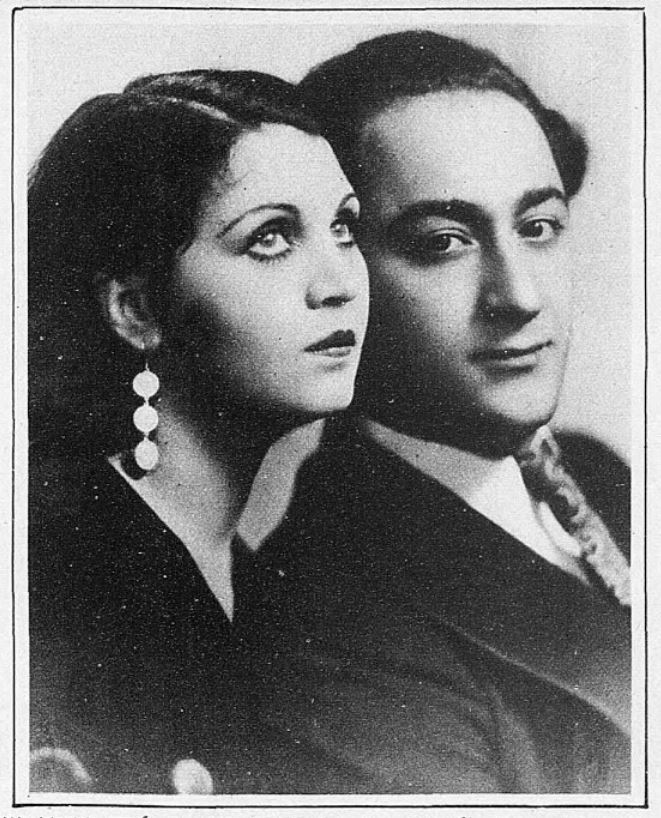
- Moishe Oysher and Florence Weiss, c. 1933
- Born: March 8, 1906; Lipcani, Bessarabia Governorate, Russian Empire
- Died: November 27, 1958 (aged 52); New Rochelle, New York, United States
- Occupations: Cantor; recording artist; film and Yiddish theatre actor

Moishe Oysher (Yiddish: משה אוישער) (March 8, 1906 – November 27, 1958) was an American cantor, recording artist, and film and Yiddish theatre actor. During the 1940s and 1950s he was one of the top Hazzans and his recordings continue to be appreciated due to his rich, powerful voice and creative arrangements.

== Biography ==
=== Early life ===
Oysher was born in Lipcani, Bessarabia Governorate, Russian Empire on March 8, 1906. He was born to a Jewish family that traced six generations of chazanim. He told writer Khaver-Paver that his grandfather sang folk songs and workers' songs to his students when Moyshe was young, and the heartfelt tunes were in my blood, and that it was from his other grandfather "Yosl der poylisher" and his father "Zelik der poylisher" that he inherited his gift as a chazan.

Oysher's father departed for America when Moyshe was young, leaving him with his grandfather. He started acting in school and played a few roles in the poet Eliezer Steinberg's Der Berditchever Rov ("The Rebbe from Berdichev"). He named Steinberg as a profound influence on his life.

In 1921, he traveled to Canada to join his father. On the way, his voice broke, so in Canada he worked at first as a dishwasher and later a launderer to support himself.

== Career ==
Oysher was able to retrain his voice and began singing again in literary and dramatic clubs. He met actor Wolf Shumsky and traveled with him to Winnipeg, where he played Yiddish theater for three seasons. He was allowed into the Canadian Actors' Union in 1924 and played in the Montreal Yiddish theater under the direction of Isidore Hollander. He may have gone back and forth between Canada and the United States during this time.

In 1928, he was on Yiddish radio in Philadelphia, where his parents had moved, and that same year he was engaged at the Hopkins Theater in Brooklyn. The manager of the Hopkins theatre, Louis Weiss, was married to the female lead, Florence Weiss; she ended up leaving Louis for Oysher. The pair left for Newark, New Jersey to work at the Lyric Theater. He married Florence Weiss in Newark in January 1929. In 1931, he was accepted into the New York Actors' Union and played in Anshel Schorr group, and lived in Philadelphia for a time. He then played with Boris Thomashevsky, then in 1932, he started his own company and traveled to Buenos Aires and across Argentina, Uruguay, and Brazil.

Returning to the U.S., he worked on the radio and starred with his wife in the Harry Kalmanovitsh - Joseph Rumshinsky operetta Dos heyst gelibt (This is what's called being loved). Around the same time, with the encouragement of friends, he applied to conduct services as chazan for the High Holidays at the First Roumanian-American Congregation, in Manhattan, New York, on the Lower East Side and caused a sensation, being perhaps the first singer to step from "the bine" (stage) to "the bimah" (pulpit). He thereafter worked around the world in both arenas.

Some say that Oysher's voice was like the "roaring of the lion." In regard to his popularity, he was considered "the darling of many Jews.."[museumoffamilyhistory.com] He liked the jazz style, popular at that time, and he used similar rhythmic melodies in his prayers, respecting always the traditional Bessarabian "doinas" and "nussach" moods of the prayers.

Oysher starred in three Yiddish films. In 1943 Oysher signed a contract with Fortune Gallo to perform several roles with the Chicago Opera Company and a fine career was foreseen, but after a heart attack he had to abandon the idea; he continued to work in radio and as a chazan and recording artist until, after other heart attacks, on the advice of his doctors, he entered semi-retirement.

Oysher died in New Rochelle from undisclosed causes in 1958 aged 52, although his age was misreported as 51.

== Family ==
Oysher was survived by his second wife Theodora (a pianist who had often accompanied him in concert), their daughter Shoshana (Rozanna), his sister Fraydele (a Yiddish theater actress and singer) and her husband Harold Sternberg, a chorister in the Metropolitan opera; their daughter is recording artist Marilyn Michaels. Rozanna married Armond Lebowitz and they had two sons, David and Brad.

Oysher died in 1958, aged 52, and is interred in Cedar Park Cemetery in Paramus, New Jersey.

== Filmography ==
- The Cantor's Son (Dem Khazn's Zindl) 1937, USA, B&W, 90 min, Yiddish with English subtitles. ISBN 1-56082-079-9

Directed by Ilya Motyleff and Sidney Goldin. Other actors: Judith Abarbanel and Florence Weiss. Based on Moishe Oysher's life. A very poor young immigrant lands a job as a custodian, where he is "discovered" and becomes famous immediately. However, his success seems meaningless as he yearns for home.

- The Singing Blacksmith (Yankl der Shmid; the Yiddish title literally means "Yankel the Smith") 1938, USA, B&W, 95 min, Yiddish with English subtitles. ISBN 1-56082-085-3

Directed by Edgar G. Ulmer. Also with Miriam Riselle and Florence Weiss. This is a classic story of a blacksmith who is a womanizer and almost an alcoholic. One day, he meets a beautiful lady called Tamara and his life changes.

- Overture to Glory (Der Vilner Shtot Khazn; the Yiddish title literally means "The Vilnius City Cantor") 1940, USA, B&W, 85 min, Yiddish with English subtitles. ISBN 1-56082-063-2

Directed by Max Nosseck. Helen Beverly and Florence Weiss. Oysher is the "Vilner Balabesl" - a cantor in Vilnius - with a renowned voice. Two men come from the Warsaw Opera to hear him sing "Kol Nidre" on Yom Kippur and are so impressed that they introduce him to European classical music and to reading sheet music; they convince him, against the wishes of much of his family (and especially his father-in-law) to become an opera singer in Warsaw. He leaves his job as the Vilnius cantor, and seems at first to be on the path to fame and fortune as an opera star in Warsaw, when the news arrives that his son has died. Grief-stricken, he stumbles over the aria he is supposed to sing, starting instead into a lullaby he used to sing to his son. In disgrace, he also loses his voice; he tries to return to his life in Vilna; finally, his voice comes briefly back to him on Yom Kippur. He sings the first few lines of the "Kol Nidre", then dies of a heart attack.

- In the 1944 movie Song of Russia, using the pseudonym Walter Lawrence, Moyshe Oysher sang "Rusland iz ir nomen" ("Russia is Her Name"), music by Jerome Kern.
- Singing in the Dark, 1956, USA, B&W, English. A motion picture about a Holocaust survivor suffering from total amnesia who comes to the United States and becomes a singer. Oysher sings in English and in Hebrew.

== See also ==
- List of Romanian Jews
