= Fraydele Oysher =

Background information
- Born: October 3, 1913; Lipkon, Bessarabia, Imperial Russia
- Died: January 5, 2004 (aged 90)
- Genres: Hazzan
- Occupations: Actress, singer

Fraydele Oysher (October 3, 1913 – January 5, 2004) was an American Yiddish theater actress and musical performer. She was one of the first female singers to publicly perform cantorial music. She was the mother of American actress and comedian Marilyn Michaels and Michael Sternberg, the sister of American actor and cantor Moishe Oysher, and the wife of Harold Sternberg, a Broadway and Metropolitan Opera performer. Throughout her career, she performed in the United States, Canada, South America, and Cuba.

== Life and work ==
=== Early life ===
Oysher was born in Lipkon, Bessarabia, Imperial Russia, which is now part of Moldova. She was the daughter of a cantor. As a child, Fraydele and her brother Moishe were taught synagogue chants by their father, Selig Oysher, and were immersed in religious music. The Oysher family immigrated to the United States when Fraydele and Moishe were children.

=== Performance career ===
Oysher worked as a child actress, performing in musicals written specifically for her at Yiddish theaters in New York City, among them The Little Queen, The Golden Girl, and Fraydele's Wedding. Frequently, she played the role of the Yeshiva boy who is later revealed to be a girl.

After moving to New York, Oysher performed in Louis Kramer's acting troupe at the Amphion Theatre, on radio, and in concerts.

=== Personal life ===
She and Harold Sternberg married in 1935. Sternberg performed at the Metropolitan Opera as a basso profundo opera singer. Oysher had two children, daughter Marilyn Michaels and son Michael Sternberg.
