= Hebrew Actors' Union =

Craft union for actors in Yiddish theater in the United States

- Founded: 1899
- Dissolved: October 2005
- Headquarters: New York City
- Location: United States
- Members: 53 (2013)
- Affiliations: AAAA (AFL–CIO)

The Hebrew Actors' Union (HAU) was a craft union for actors in Yiddish theater in the United States (primarily in New York City), and was the first actors' union in the United States. The union was affiliated with the Associated Actors and Artistes of America of the AFL.

== History ==
The Hebrew Actors' Union was officially founded in 1899 by Jewish labor leader Joseph Barondess, who had been sent by the United Hebrew Trades to aid striking actors at the People's Theatre. The Union was closely associated from its beginning with the American Federation of Labor (AFL) and with the general and Jewish labor movement.

A 1925 article in The New York Times described the union as having, at that time, "over three hundred" members, and notes that it has, "not only placed all of its members in good positions, but [that] it has also granted many privileges to non-members..." It also notes that, "A great many members of the union are American-born and all of them are thoroughly Americanized." The union represented "performers (except musicians) who are engaged in the field of Hebrew or Yiddish Language Theater."

Yiddish theater was at the height of its popularity in the 1920s and even into the 1930s, when Yiddish theater attendance had already started to decrease, the Union claimed a robust membership and there was enough of an audience to maintain quite a few Yiddish theaters throughout the country. A variety of factors, including the Great Depression, the continued acculturation of the American Jewish population and the movement of Jewish audiences towards Broadway and motion pictures and the lack of new audiences that accompanied the end of immigration combined to erode the audience for the Yiddish theater. Theaters began to close, theatrical seasons were cut short and several of the biggest stars of the Yiddish theater left for the non-Yiddish stage or Hollywood.

By the middle of the 1930 theatrical season, the managers of the remaining nine New York theaters threatened to close if there was not a dramatic percent cut in Hebrew Actors' Union personnel salaries, which were significantly higher than non-Union members. The Union threatened to strike but the theater managers kept to their promise and, starting on December 8, 1930, the theaters closed for two weeks. The Union was forced to cut its salary scale and to waive its power to set a quota for actors for every theater for the duration of the season, but it was not enough. Tensions between the Union and the theater managers continued to increase at the same time that the Yiddish theater audience continued to wane. More theaters closed, fewer productions were staged and Yiddish-language actors struggled to find enough work to support themselves.

After the death of long-time president Reuben Guskin in 1951, the Union was led by elected volunteer presidents, many of whom were active in the Yiddish theater. These included Herman Yablokoff, composer of the hit song Papirosn (Cigarettes), the Broadway and Yiddish stage actor Bernard Sauer (1986 until his death in 1991) and singer and performer Seymour Rexite, who was the last president of the Union from 1991 until his death at age 91 in 2002. After Rexite's death, the Union's leadership passed to one-time Yiddish performer Ruth Ellen, who served as acting head until October 2005, when it was declared defunct by its parent union, the Associated Actors and Artistes of America. As of February 15, 2008, it was still listed in the AFL–CIO's online list of affiliates. The union filed a terminal report with the Department of Labor, dated fiscal year 2013.

Membership (US records) View source data.
Finances (US records; ×$1000)
View chart definition.

== Legacy ==
In 2006, a cache of material including programs, photographs, plays, costumes, music manuscripts, props and other memorabilia, which The New York Times described as "moldering" in the Hebrew Actors Union building, was deposited at the YIVO Institute for Jewish Research, housed in Manhattan's Center for Jewish History. The weekly Jewish newspaper Forward reported in October 2006 and again in October 2007 about controversies surrounding the disposition of the union's building at 31 East 7th Street in the Yiddish Theater District in Manhattan, which is still owned by the Hebrew Actors Union.
