= Grigory Gricher =

Grigory Gricher or Grigory Cherikover (Note: also known as Grigori Gritscher, Grigory Zinovievich Cherikover, Gritscher-Tscherikower, etc.) (Russian: Григорий Гричер, Григорий Зиновьевич Чериковер; 1893–1945) was Soviet Ukrainian film director and screenwriter of Jewish descent. His alias "Gricher" is made of his first name and surname.

== Biography ==
Gricher was born Grigory Zinovievich Cherikover in Poltava, Russian Empire.

He served in the Red Army in the years 1942–1944.

== Filmography ==
- 1925: Jewish Luck
- 1926: Wandering Stars based on the novel by Sholem Aleichem with the same name
- 1927: Durkh trern
- 1930: Suburban Quarters
- 1934: Crystal Palace
