= National Center for Jewish Film =

The National Center for Jewish Film is a non-profit motion picture archive, distributor, and resource center. It houses the largest collection of Jewish-themed film and video outside of Israel. Its mission is to collect, restore, preserve, catalogue, and exhibit films with artistic and educational value relevant to the Jewish experience, and to disseminate these materials to the widest possible audience.

Founded in 1976 by Miriam Saul Krant, the National Center for Jewish Film (NCJF or the Center) became an independent 501(c)(3) non-profit organization in 1981. The Center is located on the campus of Brandeis University in Waltham, Massachusetts.

== Collections ==
The NCJF archive exclusively owns an estimated 10,000 cans of film (35 mm, 16 mm, 8 mm, super 8) and thousands of master videotapes. This collection of feature films, documentaries, fiction and non-fiction short films, newsreels, home movies, and institutional films includes material dating from 1903 to the present. These films address a wide range of topics, including: the Jewish immigrant experience in America, Yiddish theatre and cinema, pre–World War II European Jewry, the Holocaust, Judaism and the arts and music, relations between Jews and other groups, Sephardic culture, Israeli history, and Hollywood portrayals of Jewish life.

The Center’s collection includes ethnographic studies of past and present Jewish communities in China, Mexico, Morocco, Australia, Tunisia, Russia, Argentina, Bosnia, India, Romania, Greece, and Egypt, travelogues depicting Jewish life in Poland before World War II, U.S. government World War II newsreels, studies in Israeli history, Holocaust films exploring little-known sites of genocide like Transnistria and Babi Yar, anti-Jewish propaganda, and Yiddish-American feature films. Individually and collectively, the films distributed by NCJF dispel stereotypes about Jews and educate audiences about the diversity and cultural richness of Jewish life.

== Film preservation ==
NCJF's first priority is the preservation and restoration of rare and endangered nitrate and acetate films. NCJF preservation activities began 30 years ago with the rescue of a languishing Yiddish language film collection. Since that time, NCJF has preserved and restored 36 Yiddish feature films, making them available in 35mm, 16mm, video, and DVD formats.

The Center's other archival and preservations projects include features and documentaries from around the globe; early American silent film comedies and features; rare early Russian films; pre–World War II home movies of Yurburg, Horodok, Novogrudok, and Berlin; travelogues of Białystok, Kraków, Warsaw, Vilnius, and Lviv; industrial and fundraising films produced by Jewish agencies; early documentary footage of Palestine/Israel. NCJF’s most recent restorations include the Yiddish feature films The Cantor’s Son and The Living Orphan, the preservation of rare home movies documenting the way of life in several small communities of Eastern Europe, Jewish chicken farmers in New Jersey, and merchants in Massachusetts, and film of President Harry S. Truman addressing the issue of Middle East politics at an Israel Bonds dinner in 1956.

NCJF was invited by the National Endowment for the Arts and the National Film Preservation Foundation to participate (with nine other institutions) in the millennium film preservation program, "Treasures of American Film Archives." NCJF is a founding member of the Association of Moving Image and a member of the International Film Archives Association and The Council of Archives and Research Libraries in Jewish Studies.

== Other activities ==
NCJF’s other activities include film distribution, producing public programs, and providing programming, consultation, and research assistance to approximately 2000 individuals and institutions a year.

The Center’s rare film materials are made available to scholars, curators, journalists, teachers, authors, artists, filmmakers, and the general public, and have been exhibited and screened worldwide. They have been used as the basis for numerous books and articles, and have been included in many museum exhibitions and film productions, including The Winds of War, Imaginary Witness: Hollywood and the Holocaust, Chasing Shadows, The Last Days, The Struma, Hollywoodism, and scores of independent documentaries.

NCJF distributes 350 films, including the productions of over 100 contemporary independent filmmakers. The Center produces and sells videocassettes and DVDs of its titles for both home and educational use and licenses its films for television broadcasts; recently stations include Turner Movie Classics, Jewish Broadcast Network, Shalom TV, ARTE [France/Germany], SBS [Australia], NOGA [Israel], and Four Films [UK].

NCJF began organizing its own film festival -- JEWISHFILM—in 1998 at the Edie and Lew Wasserman Cinematheque at Brandeis University.
