= Zvee Scooler =

Russian-born American actor and radio commentator (1899–1985)

- Born: December 1, 1899; Kamenets-Podolsky, Russian Empire, now Kamianets-Podilskyi, Ukraine
- Died: March 25, 1985 (aged 85); New York City, New York
- Occupations: Stage, film, television, voice actor

Zvee Scooler (December 1, 1899 – March 25, 1985) was a Russian-born American actor and radio commentator. He was born in Kamenets-Podolsky (now Ukraine) and his original surname was Shkolyar. He came to the United States in 1912. He performed in both Yiddish and English, on the stage, television, and film. He first joined Maurice Schwartz's Yiddish Art Theater in 1921 -- his debut was in the first American performance of S. Ansky's classic play The Dybbuk -- and remained with the company for 25 years. He is probably best known for his roles in Fiddler on the Roof, playing Mordcha, the innkeeper in the Broadway musical (he was the only actor to appear in every performance of the musical's entire seven-year-run) and the rabbi in the film version. He appeared as Duddy's grandfather in the 1974 film "The Apprenticeship of Duddy Kravitz." Another of his more notable roles was that of Boris' father in Woody Allen's Love and Death.

He was known as the Grammeister (Master of the Rhyme) on WEVD, a Yiddish radio station in New York City. Every Sunday, from the 1930s until his death, Scooler presented a ten-minute segment on the radio show, Forward Hour, which was news and commentary in rhyme.

He died in New York City on March 25, 1985, at age 85, and was buried at Cedar Park Cemetery, in Paramus, New Jersey.

== Filmography ==
Year	Title	Role	Notes
1932	Uncle Moses	Charlie	
1965	Andy	Mr. Chadakis	
1968	No Way to Treat a Lady	Old Man	Uncredited
1969	A Dream of Kings	Zenoitis	
1971	Fiddler on the Roof	Rabbi	
1973	Lady Ice	Jeweler	
1973	The Mad Adventures of Rabbi Jacob	Le rabbin New-yorkais	Uncredited
1974	The Apprenticeship of Duddy Kravitz	Grandfather	
1975	Hester Street	Rabbi	
1975	Love and Death	Father	
1977	Thieves	Old Man	
1978	King of the Gypsies	Phuro	
1979	Boardwalk	Rabbi	
1981	The Chosen	Bal Koreh	
1983	Enormous Changes at the Last Minute	Pa	
1984	Over the Brooklyn Bridge	Rebbe	(final film role)
