= Risa Schwartz =

American actress

Risa Schwartz Whiting
- Born: Fanny Englander; November 25, 1939; Antwerp, Belgium
- Died: June 20, 2017 (aged 77); New Milford, Connecticut, US
- Occupations: Actress, painter, poet
- Spouse: Robert Whiting
- Children: 2

Risa Schwartz Whiting, born Fanny Englander (November 25, 1939 – June 20, 2017) was an actress active in the United States, most commonly known for her role in The Tenth Man (Chayefsky play) as Evelyn Foreman. Her adoptive father was Maurice Schwartz, founder of the Yiddish Art Theatre and its associated school in New York City.

== Early life ==
Risa Schwartz Whiting was born in Antwerp, Belgium as Fanny Englander, the daughter of Abraham Jozef Englander and Chawe Frank, a Jewish family. Her father was born in Podgórze, and her mother in Nowy Sącz. From Poland, her parents had migrated to Belgium. Whiting had a brother named Marvin Schwartz (born Mozes Englander). During the war, Whiting's parents were deported to Auschwitz-Birkenau, and were murdered there. Whiting and her brother ended up in a children's home, Meisjeshuis (Antwerp). On September 21, 1942, 25 Jewish children who were with Whiting in the children's home, were arrested and deported to Auschwitz-Birkenau, where they were all murdered. Shortly thereafter, Whiting was rescued and transferred from the Meisjeshuis orphanage to the Sint-Erasmus hospital in Borgerhout (Antwerp), where she went into hiding with several other Jewish children. After another rescue, she was brought to the non-Jewish Vander Voordt family, where she survived the remainder of the war.

== Family and career ==
After the war, Whiting lived in the Jewish orphanage in Wezembeek-Oppem with her brother. In 1947, they were adopted by Maurice Schwartz and his wife Anna. Maurice Schwartz was a stage and film actor active in the United States, who founded the Yiddish Art Theatre and its associated school in 1918 in New York City, and was its theatrical producer and director. Whiting grew up in the theatre.

In her professional career, Whiting played the role of Evelyn Foreman in The Tenth Man (Chayefsky play). Later, she became a theatrical performer in Maui. In 2004, she was honored for her theatrical contributions to Hawaï by the Hawaï chapter of B'nai B'rith and Hillel at University of Hawaiʻi at Mānoa. Whiting died in New Milford, Connecticut in 2017, at age 77.
