= Sudylkiv =

Rural locality in Khmelnytskyi Oblast, Ukraine

Sudylkiv Судилків Sudyłków
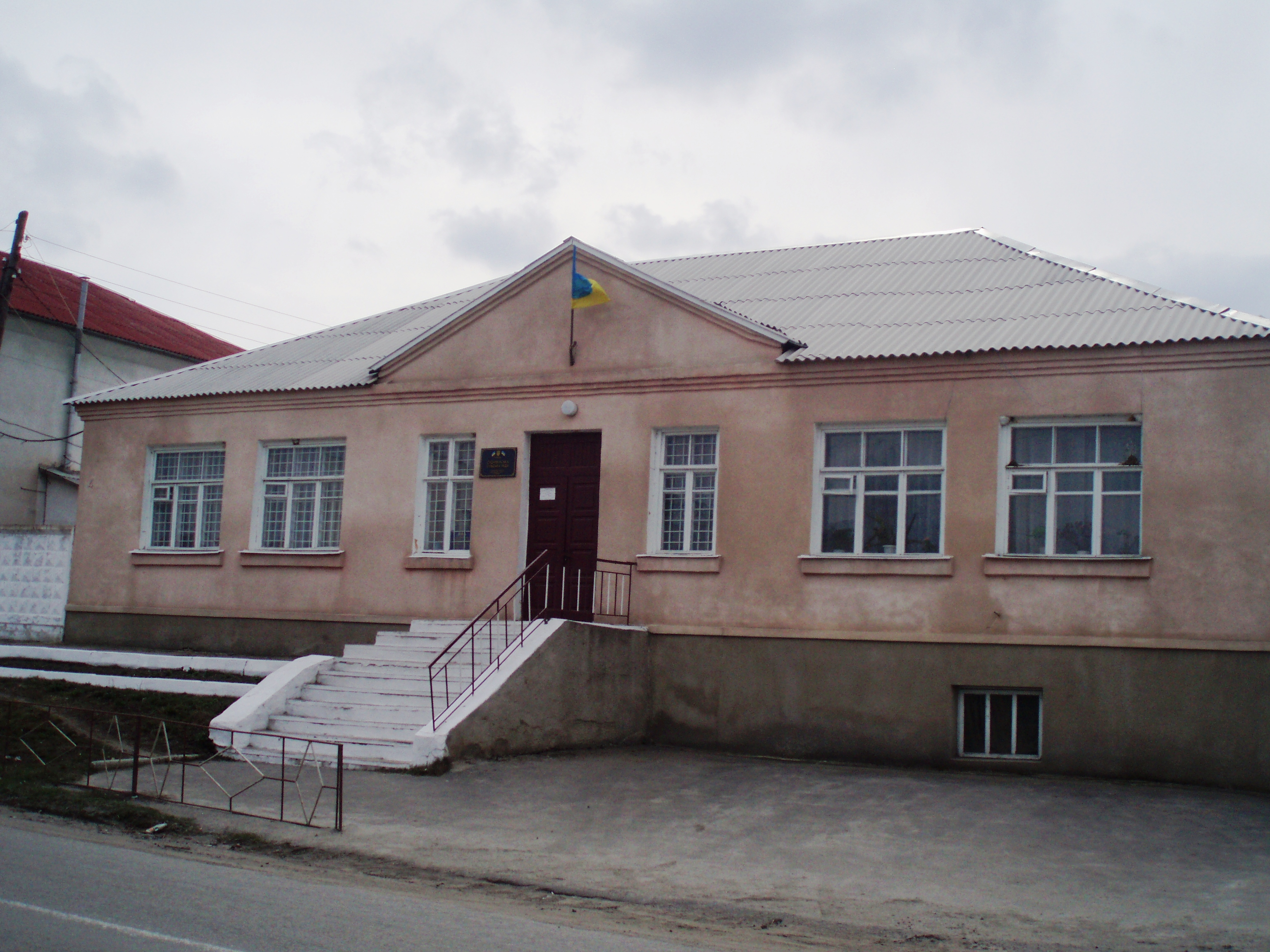
- Sudylkiv village council

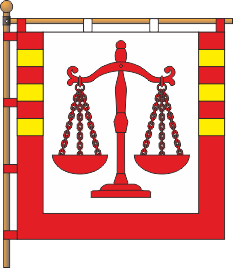
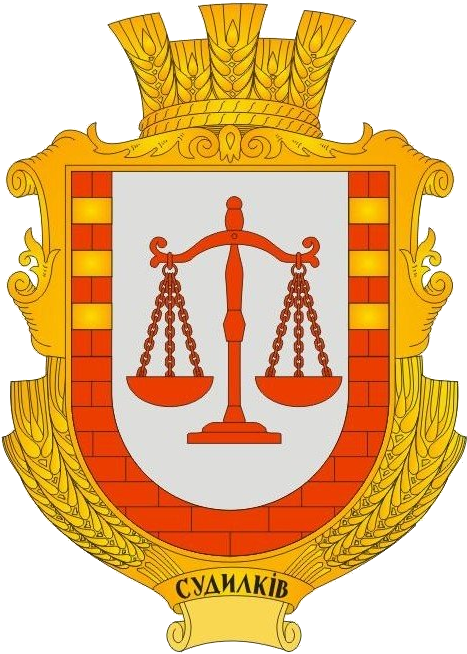
- Flag Coat of arms
- Interactive map of Sudylkiv
- Location in Ukraine Sudylkiv (Ukraine)
- Coordinates: 50°09′59″N 27°07′53″E
- Country: Ukraine
- Oblast: Khmelnytskyi Oblast
- Raion: Shepetivskyi Raion
- Time zone: UTC+2 (EET)
  - Summer (DST): UTC+3 (EEST)
- Postal code: 30430
- Area code: +380 3840
- KOATUU: 6825588501

Sudylkiv (Ukrainian: Судилків) is a village in Shepetivka Raion in Khmelnytskyi Oblast in Ukraine. It hosts the administration of Sudylkiv rural hromada, one of the hromadas of Ukraine.

== History ==
The 1897 census reveals that out of a total population of 5,551 there were 2,712 Jews. On August 20, 1941, the 45th reserve police battalion killed 471 Jews in a nearby forest. Today, the formerly important Jewish community is nonexistent due to the Holocaust and emigration.

== Notable people ==
- Moshe Chaim Ephraim of Sudilkov, prominent rabbi from the town
- Rebecca Spielberg, US film director Steven Spielberg's grandmother
- From 1865 to 1872, Ignacy Jan Paderewski, a Polish pianist and composer who became a spokesman for Polish independence, spent his childhood in Sudylkiv. In 1919, he was the new nation's Prime Minister and foreign minister, during which he signed the Treaty of Versailles, which ended World War I.
- Maurice Schwartz, a stage and film actor active in the United States. He founded the Yiddish Art Theatre and its associated school in New York City and was its theatrical producer and director. He also worked in Hollywood, mostly as an actor in silent films but also as a film director, producer, and screenwriter.
