= Andy (film) =

1965 dramatic film directed by Richard C. Sarafian

- Theatrical release poster
- Directed by: Richard C. Sarafian
- Written by: Richard C. Sarafian
- Produced by: Richard C. Sarafian
- Starring: Norman Alden; Tamara Daykarhanova; Zvee Scooler; Ann Wedgeworth; Murvyn Vye
- Cinematography: Ernest Caparros
- Edited by: Aram Avakian
- Music by: Robert Prince
- Production company: Deran Productions
- Distributed by: Universal Pictures
- Release date: January 21, 1965; (New York)
- Running time: 86 minutes
- Country: United States
- Language: English

Andy is a 1965 American drama film written, produced, and directed by Richard C. Sarafian and starring Norman Alden. It was Sarafian's first directing credit for a feature film.

== Cast ==
- Norman Alden as Andy Cliadakis
- Tamara Daykarhanova as Mrs. Cliadakis
- Zvee Scooler as Mr. Cliadakis
- Murvyn Vye as bartender
- Warren Finnerty as Sanovich
- Ann Wedgeworth as Margie
- William Griffis as Kennedy
- Al Nesor as Sommerville
- Sudie Bond
- Cindy Grover
- Judith Lowry
- Lou Martini as longshoreman

== Production ==
The film was a "quasi-autobiographical piece," derived from Sarafian's memories of his early days in New York City. Sarafian had been working on the screenplay for years with his wife Joan Altman. It was financed for $300,000 by Universal Pictures under its short-lived "New Horizons" program for up-and-coming filmmakers.

Sarafian's brother-in-law Robert Altman wanted the rights to the film, which he planned to direct with Dan Blocker in the lead role. Sarafian refused, which led to a permanent split between the two men.

== See also ==
- Charly
- Walter
