= A Dream of Kings (film) =

1969 drama film by Daniel Mann

- Directed by: Daniel Mann
- Written by: Ian McLellan Hunter
- Based on: A Dream of Kings; 1966 novel by Harry Mark Petrakis
- Produced by: Jules Schermer
- Starring: Anthony Quinn; Irene Papas; Inger Stevens; Sam Levene
- Cinematography: Richard H. Kline
- Edited by: Ray Daniels; Walter Hannemann
- Music by: Alex North
- Distributed by: National General Pictures
- Release date: December 15, 1969
- Running time: 110 minutes
- Country: United States
- Language: English
- Budget: $3 million

A Dream of Kings is a 1969 drama film directed by Daniel Mann and written by Ian McLellan Hunter, adapted from the 1966 novel of the same name by Harry Mark Petrakis. The film stars Anthony Quinn, Irene Papas, Sam Levene and Inger Stevens in her final film role, as she committed suicide four months after the film's release. Critics raved over Quinn's performance and those of the supporting cast.

== Plot ==
Matsoukas, a Chicago-based Greek-American married to his long-suffering wife Caliope, learns that his son is dying. Convinced that the child will fare better in Greece, Matsoukas attempts to raise the airfare to send the family there. However, all of his sources of income vanish until he is forced to fix a dice game to raise the cash. His wife eventually raises the money by stealing from her mother. There is only enough for two seats. In the end, she sends Matsoukas and the boy off with tearful embraces. On the plane, Matsoukas looks around him and begins to smile.

== Cast ==
- Anthony Quinn as Matsoukas
- Irene Papas as Caliope
- Inger Stevens as Anna
- Sam Levene as Cicero
- Val Avery as Fatsas
- Radames Pera as Stavros
- Tamara Daykarhanova as Mother-in-law
- Peter Mamakos as Falconis
- James Dobson as Doctor
- Zvee Scooler as Zenoitis
- Bill Walker as Kampana
- Hard Boiled Haggerty as Turk
- Alan Reed Sr. as Fig King

== Home media ==
A Dream of Kings was released as a Region 1 fullscreen DVD by Warner Home Video on March 23, 2009, via its Warner Archive MOD (manufacture-on-demand) service.

== See also ==
- List of American films of 1969
