= Conried =

Conried is a surname. Notable people with the surname include:

- Hans Conried (1917–1982), American actor
- Heinrich Conried (1855–1909), Austrian-born American theatrical manager and director
