= Jacques Weisser =

Public figure in the UK

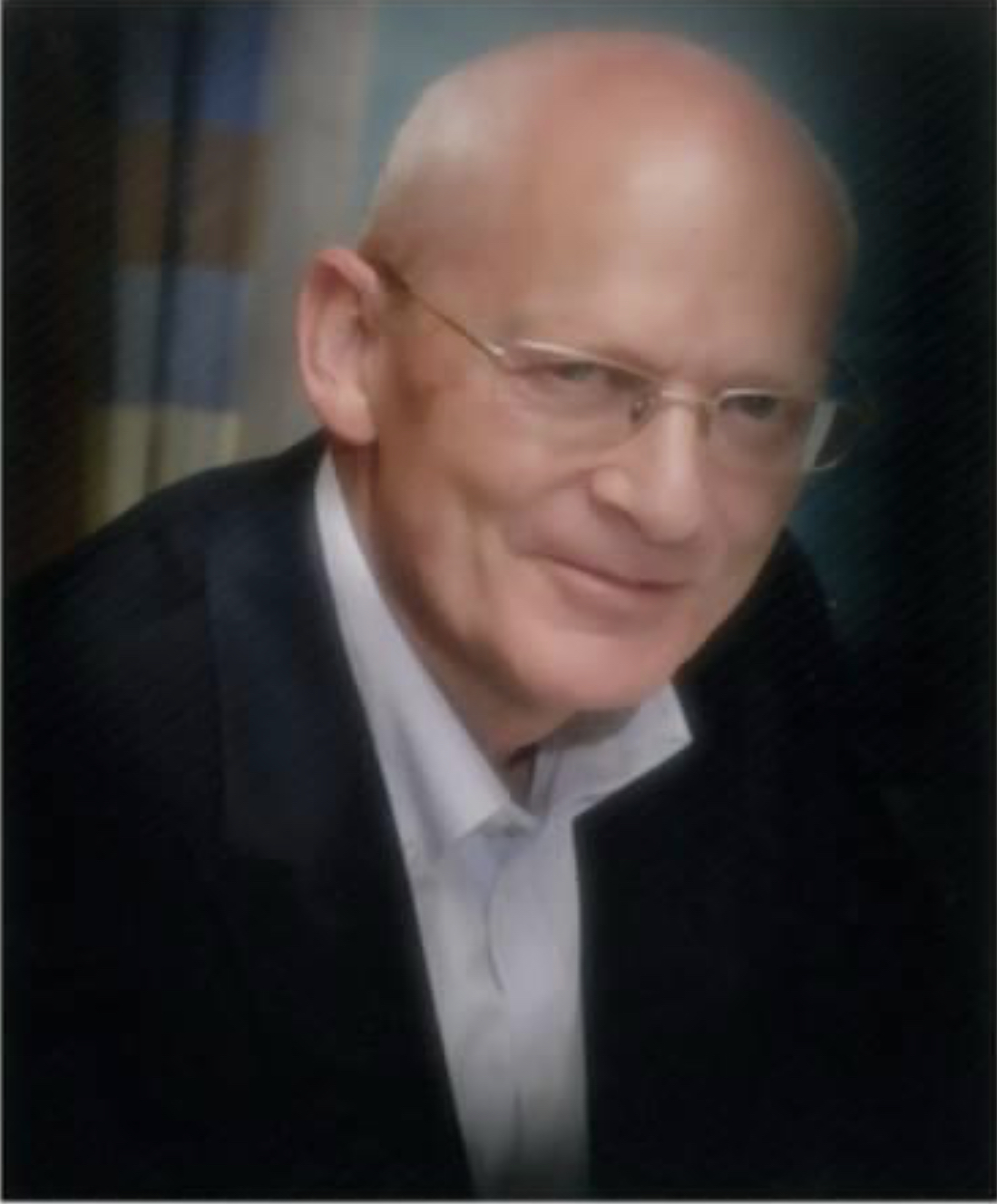
- Born: Salomon Jacques Weisser; February 7, 1942; Antwerp, Belgium
- Spouse: Judy Weisser
- Children: 1

Jacques Weisser BEM (born Salomon Jacques Weisser; February 7, 1942) is a Belgian-born English trustee of Yad Vashem in the United Kingdom and former executive director of the Association of Jewish Ex-Servicemen and Women.

== Early life ==
Salomon Jacques Weisser was born in Antwerp, Belgium to Jakob Weisser and Martha Mandelbaum, both of Polish-Jewish descent. In the summer of 1942, following the Western Campaign, his father was deported to labor camps in Northern France where he was forced to work as slave labor for Organisation Todt, dedicated to the construction of the Atlantic Wall. Weisser would remain with his mother in Antwerp until September 11, 1942, where she was arrested in public and later deported to and murdered in Auschwitz-Birkenau as part of the Holocaust. With the arrest of his mother, and lacking both his parents, he was rescued by an unknown individual and brought to the children's home of Meisjeshuis. The exact circumstances surrounding both the arrest of his mother and his retrieval remain unclear, but his appropriation of orphan status would ensure protection against deportation. On September 21, 1942, twenty five Jewish children who were with Weisser in Meisjeshuis were arrested after surpassing toddlerhood through reaching the age of 5 and all deported to Auschwitz-Birkenau, where they died. Weisser and the other younger surviving children were then moved from Meisjeshuis to the Sint-Erasmus hospital in Borgerhout. He remained here in hiding up until June 1944 when he was discovered and arrested by the Germans; Weisser would survive the Holocaust and was not deported, in large part due to the enforcement within Belgium of statutes preventing the deportation of orphaned infants. (Note: This was enforced to maintain the guise, promised to the Belgian people, of relocating Jewish families to labor camps; as orphaned infants cannot work and have no family they could move with, deportation subsequently becomes unjustifiable by the official context. Instead, the Gestapo would keep them in certain orphanages as so-called 'Alleinstehende Kinder'.) His father would survive several concentration camps (notably Auschwitz-Birkenau as well as Buchenwald in its final days) and a death march during the German retreat from Poland, reuniting with Weisser in 1945.

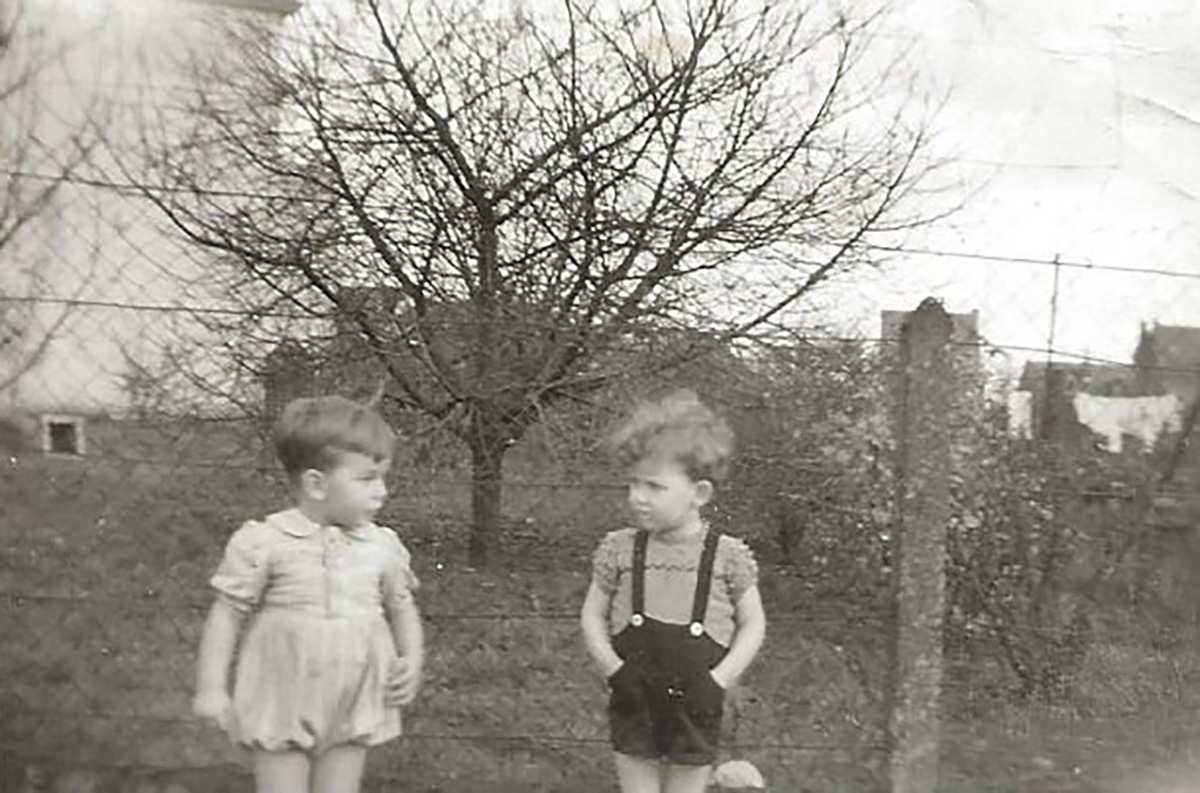
Jacques Weisser (right) in hiding in Belgium with Bill Frankenstein (born Bernard Baron, left), 1944.

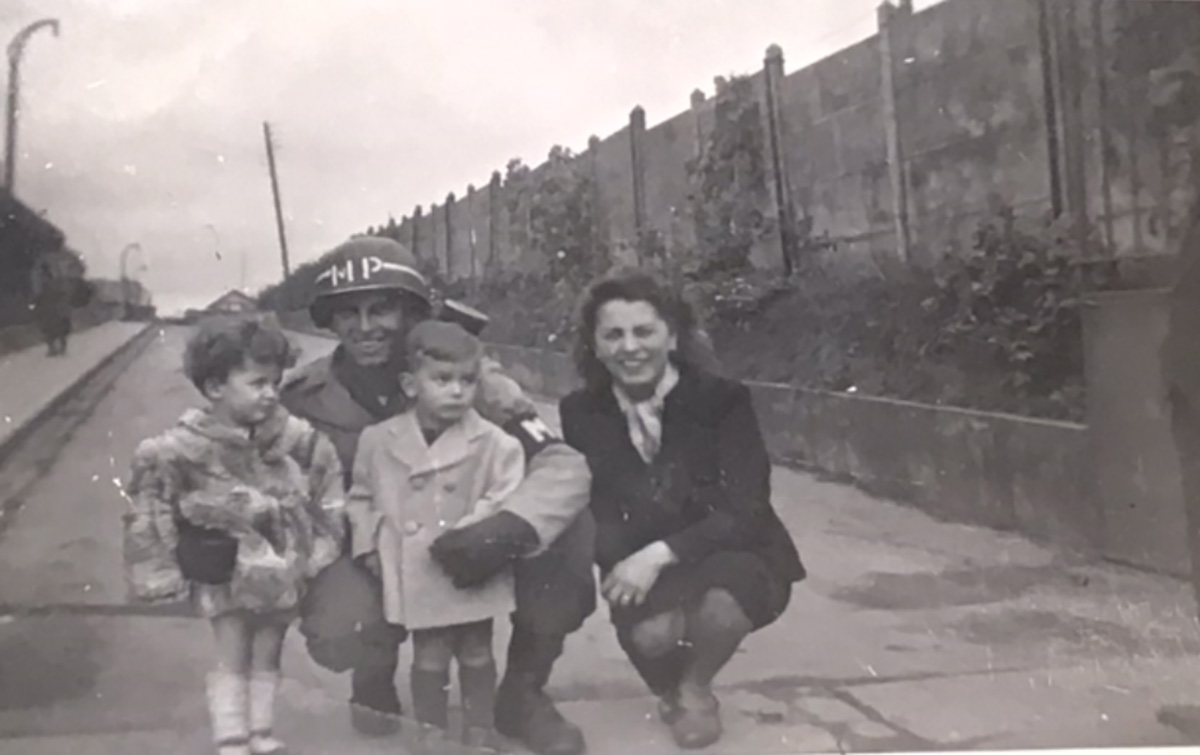
Jacques Weisser (left) and Bill Frankenstein (right) either side of an American soldier following the liberation of Belgium, 1944.

== Bibliography ==
- Heinsman, Reinier (2021). From the Children's Home to the Gas Chamber: And how some avoided their fate.
