= Irving Place Theatre =

Theatre in Manhattan, New York, U.S.

Coordinates: 40°44′5″N 73°59′19″W

An undated photograph of the Irving Place Theatre

The Irving Place Theatre was located at the southwest corner of Irving Place and East 15th Street in the Union Square neighborhood of Manhattan, New York City. Built in 1888, it served as a German language theatre, a Yiddish theatre, a burlesque house, a union meeting hall, a legitimate theatre and a movie theatre. It was demolished in 1984.

== History ==
The original building on the site was Irving Hall, which opened in 1860 as a venue for balls, lectures, and concerts. It was also for many years the base for one faction of the city's Democratic Party.

The facility was rebuilt, and opened as Amberg's German Theatre in 1888 under the management of Gustav Amberg, as a home for German-language theatre. Heinrich Conried took over management in 1893, and changed the name to Irving Place Theatre. The first night of the play Narrentanz (The Fool´s Game) by Leo Birinski took place here on November 13, 1912.

In 1918 the facility became the home of the Yiddish Art Theater company under the management of Maurice Schwartz. By the 1920s burlesque shows were offered alongside Yiddish drama. Composer-arranger Harry Lubin, of The Outer Limits fame, was musical director of the theater during the 1920s and 1930s.

Clemente Giglio converted the theatre in 1939 into a cinema to present Italian films. In 1940 it was taken over by a group of non-Equity actors, the "Merely Players", whose productions were picketed by the theatrical unions. During World War II it presented a steady program of mixed bills of Soviet propaganda and French films, as well as weekly folk dance sessions.

== Ethnic theater and the immigrant ==
Comparative Study on ethnic stages in the United States show ethnic stage activity spanning over a century and a half. Ethnic stages were created by and for immigrants themselves coming from Europe, Latin America, and Asia. Ethnic stages resonated strongly with immigrants because it reflected on their concerns and experiences. Ethnic stages were primarily designed to have immigrant-themed works for recently arrived immigrant audiences. Through the ethnic stage, immigrants maintained and expanded their cultural memory. Immigrant influence on American society can be pinpointed to places like Swede Town (Chicago); Little Germany (New York); Little Italy (New York); and chinatown (San Francisco, New York, Los Angeles). Despite the overt, clear presence of immigrant communities all over America, the ethnic stage was hidden and closed-off from outsiders. Those not part of specific ethnic communities were not aware or interested in that community's theater. Ethnic theater was undermined by immigrants themselves. First generation immigrants preferred plays in their homeland language while second generation immigrants favored mainstream theater in the English-language. Despite this division, ethnic theater prospered in the face of continuous mass immigration, lasting several decades or a century. Immigrants and their descendants never completely lost interest in ethnic theater but with the advent of film, immigrants, like their American counterparts attended American Motion Pictures, providing them insight into their new home and assimilating them.

The vaudeville was also another competing form of entertainment eager to lure in immigrants as audience members. The vaudeville and the ethnic theater played different social functions. Ethnic stages such as Yiddish and Italian theater sought to preserve cherished aspects of old-world culture. Through the celebration of shared values, ethnic theaters gave immigrants a sense of community and solidarity in the face of increasingly chaotic and diverse everyday life in the city. Vaudevilles, on the other hand, served to interpret ethnic communities via ethnic caricatures through comedy. At times, ethnic communities protested their caricatures in the vaudeville but nonetheless were among the audience members of the vaudeville. Just like ethnic theater, the vaudeville offered a glimpse of immigrant life though, the vaudeville heavily stressed ethnic caricatures. Immigrants were drawn to the vaudeville primarily because these ethnic caricatures though unfavorable, bore a realistic resemblance to the immigrants and they would encounter on the streets and neighborhoods.

== As a German theater ==
In 1893, Polish immigrant, Heinrich Conried changed the theater's name to Irving Place Theater. He worked as a director and manager, establishing the theater's success and financial stability until 1903. Though Conried aimed to primarily attract New York's German-speaking population, not all were regular theatre-goers, so he devised a program with a frequent change of bill to expand his audience. Each week he presented three or more different plays ranging from classics to comedies, and his theater was acclaimed for having a varied repertory. Musical plays were also presented, especially those popular on German stages such as Kumarker und Picarde and Das Versprechen hinter’m Herd (The Promise Behind the Hearth). Conried sought to expand and educate his audience through the institution of an outreach program in eastern universities, providing performances of the German classics and comedies to students from Yale, Harvard, Princeton, Cornell, and Columbia. Through this program, students were encouraged to regularly attend the Irving Place Theater. In 1901, sponsored by Yale's German Department, Conried's company performed Lessing's Minna von Barheim in New Haven. In 1903, after being manager at the Irving Place for ten years, Conried took directorship of the Metropolitan Opera but would still continue as director of the Irving place until he fell ill and resigned in 1908.

The Irving Place Theater like other German Theaters were undermined by their commitment to produce classic German drama and their desire to give in to mainstream American demands by merely producing German versions of popular American theater. The German theater's audience was also torn by first and second generation Germans.The type of repertory offered by theaters was a critical factor in determining the type of audience. The first generation sought to watch traditional or classic repertory and the Americanized second generation preferred popular farces. Because first generation and second generation sought to watch different things, Conried devised varied program at Irving Place where he included both high-end classics and popular farces in order to diversify and expand his audience. In theory, however, Conried had envisioned a theater solely dedicated to serious drama, connecting back to German roots. In his 1898 speech, celebrating his twenty-fifth anniversary of his theatrical career, Conried expresses that German theater should be “a reflection of the dramatic literature of the old fatherland, and in that way to be the first and most powerful pillar for the cultivation and maintenance of German culture in America”. Nonetheless, the German theater was constantly divided since first and second generation immigrants sought different repertories. Peter Conolly-Smith examines the German theater's demise in a study, conveying that the German theater's collapse in American culture had little to do with the animosities against German immigrants produced by World War I and more to do with German theater's assimilation into American culture.

Actor Rudolf Christians took over of Irving Place Theater in 1913 as director of the company alongside two other manager-directors until 1918 when the company disbanded. Christian's vision similarly aligned with that of Conried's. They both sought to present great modern plays and the classics. Under Christians, for the first time in the U.S., George Bernard Shaw's Pygmalion was presented in German. Both Christians and Conried desired to attract non-German speakers as their audience though at the core of their audience were German immigrants. Under Christians, the New York Times remarked on how the Irving Place Theater embodied German patriotism in the U.S. before America's entrance into the war. After America's involvement, German patriotism decreased because Germany had become America's enemy, and in 1918 the Irving Place Theater was driven to its demise as a German company. The collapse of the Irving Place theater like any other German theater was caused by various many factors: anti-German prejudice, German America's lack of interest in the German stage, and other competing forms of entertainment such as films, English-language theater, and the vaudeville.

== As a Yiddish theater ==
By 1910 Yiddish theater was flourishing on the Lower East Side in New York City, and Yiddish companies had taken over many German theaters on the Bowery; from the late 1910s to the early 1920s, Yiddish theater gradually moved northward, first to Second Avenue and then to Irving Place and East 16th Street, reflecting the beginning dispersion of the East European immigrant Jewish community. The Irving Place theater came under the management of Jewish actor, director, and producer Maurice Schwartz in 1918, and he changed the name to the new Yiddish Art Theater. His new theater thrived until it is disbanded in 1950.

Yiddish Theater began in Europe in the early 18th century and came to the United States with mass Eastern European immigration, thriving primarily in New York City from the late 19th to mid-20th century. The idea to establish a Yiddish theater came from the immigrant community who wanted to combat the effects of shund (trash) popular entertainment. For the immigrant community, Yiddish theater offered entertainment, an escape, and reminisces of immigrant life and home traditions. When the theater opened for the first time as the new Yiddish Art Theater on August 30, 1918, it did not find huge success. Zalmen Libibin's Man and his Shadow, did not meet audience and critic expectations. The new theater would find success with Peretz Hershbein's The Forgotten Nook and The Blacksmith's Daughter, both of which emphasized on the idyllic, village life, something that resonated strongly with immigrants. The Yiddish Art theater at Irving Place, like other Yiddish theaters, rejected popular, sentimental and melodramatic improvisations, and instead focused on quality by carefully rehearsing plays, ensemble, acting, and presentation. Yiddish theater was an entertainment of cultural exchange. Through the translations of classics, immigrants could learn about world literature; through the translation of popular American theater, immigrants could americanize.

After World War I, Yiddish theater in America began to show signs of a struggling show business. Restricted immigration and a demographic movement away from New York City's old neighborhoods affected the Yiddish theater's prosperity. Ever-increasing assimilation by immigrants continually pushed Yiddish language and Yiddish theater out America. English words made their way into Yiddish dialogue while American mainstream productions influenced Yiddish productions. Just like had occurred in German theaters, the younger generation of immigrants preferred English-language, americanized theater, shows and films. With time, the Yiddish theater's audience decreased, and Yiddish plays were placed on limited runs. Just as in theater in general, the Yiddish theater's demise would come with the spread of film and television. The domination of Hebrew also drove out Yiddish language and Yiddish theater. Hitler and Stalin were responsible for the waning of Yiddish culture. They destroyed old world sources and texts of Yiddish language and culture. Nonetheless, today there are Jewish organizations and centers that sponsor theater-related events. And many are still interested in making Yiddish theater accessible especially since Yiddish theater still resonates with American Jews because it carries memories of their ancestors and cultural traditions.

== In culture ==
The theater is the setting for the 2013 fictional play, The Nance.
