= Harry Mark Petrakis =

American writer (1923–2021)

- Born: June 5, 1923; St. Louis, Missouri, U.S.
- Died: February 2, 2021 (aged 97) near Chesterton, Indiana, U.S.
- Occupations: Novelist, short story writer
- Spouse: Diana Petrakis
- Writing career
- Language: English
- Notable works: A Dream of Kings, Pericles on 31st Street

Harry Mark Petrakis (/pɛˈtreɪkɪs/ peh-TRAY-kiss; June 5, 1923 – February 2, 2021) was an American novelist and writer of short stories. He was best known for depicting the life of Greek-American immigrants in the Greektown neighborhood of Chicago, Illinois. He died at his home near Chesterton, Indiana, in February 2021, at the age of 97.

== Early life ==
Petrakis was born in June 1923, the son of the Reverend Mark Petrakis, a Greek Orthodox priest who immigrated to the United States with his wife Stella in 1916. They were villagers from central Crete, the village Vilandredon, near the city of Rethymnon, who came bringing their first four children (Dan, Barbara, Manuel, and Tasula). Harry Mark, the fifth child, was born on June 5, 1923, in St. Louis, Missouri. A sixth child, Irene, was later born in Chicago, where the family settled.

Harry Mark (Greek name, "Haralambos") attended Koraes School, the elementary school of Sts. Constantine & Helen Greek Orthodox Church, his father's parish in Chicago. During Greek school days he read his original poems and played the lead roles in class productions of Greek tragedies. He also learned to read and write the Greek language, which he spoke at home (although he never wrote in Greek). He also met his future wife in Greek school, a Greek-American girl named Diana Perparos, whose father John owned several dry cleaning and shoe repair stores in Chicago. Despite being the son of a priest, Petrakis belonged to a gang, which was made up of sons of immigrants of varied ethnic ancestry in their Woodlawn neighborhood. Later, in Stelmark, one of his numerous autobiographical works, he recalled:

We contended with one another to deride the customs of the old country. On our Saturday forays into neighborhoods beyond our own, to prove we were really Americans, we ate hot dogs and drank Cokes. If a boy didn't have ten cents for this repast he went hungry, for he dared not bring a sandwich from home made of the spiced meats our families ate.

One of our untamed games was to seek out the owner of a pushcart or a store, unmistakably an immigrant, and bedevil him with a chorus of insults and jeers. To prove allegiance to the gang it was necessary to reserve our fiercest malevolence for a storekeeper or peddler belonging to our own ethnic background.

For that reason I led a raid on the small, shabby grocery of old Barba Nikos, a short, sinewy Greek who walked with a slight limp and sported a flaring, handlebar mustache.

We stood outside his store and dared him to come out. When he emerged to do battle, we plucked a few plums and peaches from the baskets on the sidewalk and retreated across the street to eat them while he watched. He waved a fist and hurled epithets at us in ornamental Greek.

Aware that my mettle was being tested, I raised my arm and threw my half-eaten plum at the old man. My aim was accurate and the plum struck him on the cheek. He shuddered and put his hand to the stain. He stared at me across the street, and although I could not see his eyes, I felt them sear my flesh. He turned and walked silently back into the store. The boys slapped my shoulders in admiration, but it was a hollow victory that rested like a stone in the pit of my stomach.

— Stelmark, pp. 54–55

At age 11 Petrakis contracted tuberculosis. He was placed on bed rest and ended up missing two years of school. He later wrote, "Those two years were a strange, intense period for me, weeks and months of boredom, excitement, discovery, despair, and terror. They affected my life, I am certain, more than any other interlude of my childhood and youth" (Stelmark, p. 86). He passed the time reading in bed. As a grown man he would later refer to books as "a refuge ... a sanctuary against a growing depression bred by inactivity" (from his Song of My Life, p. 18). One of the books that influenced him most was Martin Eden by Jack London, in which a self-educated sailor dreams of becoming a writer. He also read The Book of Knowledge in its entirety.

After getting well Petrakis returned to Englewood High School, on Chicago's Southwest Side. He excelled at military exercises, but started playing hooky from school. Finally, he ceased attending at all. His father, seeing his son's abhorrence of school, sent him to stay with his brother Manuel at the University of Illinois at Urbana-Champaign. Petrakis was enrolled in high school in Urbana but shortly became truant again, skipping school and often spending the day reading in one of the university libraries. Learning of this, his father brought him back to Chicago and enrolled him in a parochial school which specialized in disciplining troublesome youths, but where Petrakis lasted only two weeks. He never graduated from high school. Nevertheless, in later years he would be awarded six honorary doctorates and would teach at the university level, as for instance when he held the Nikos Kazantzakis Chair in Modern Greek Studies at San Francisco State University, or when he acted as the McGuffey Visiting Lecturer at Ohio University.

== Gambling addiction ==
Like many youths without a high school diploma, Petrakis turned to gambling to make a living. Starting when he was 16 years old, he and an older betting buddy would study the Daily Racing Form while his parents thought he was attending school. In his 2014 autobiography Song of My Life, Petrakis recounts how he pawned his brother's suits, sold his sister's books, and stole from cash registers to get money to feed his habit. One morning, he recalls, he went to his father, who never refused him money, and borrowed $200—the parish priest's whole monthly salary—from him in order to pay the gas and electric bills on the studio apartment where he was living with his wife, who was pregnant. By afternoon, he had gambled it all away. Looking back, he views that day as the first step toward his deliverance. Having betrayed his wife and father, he says, marked the beginning of his healing. He gambled less and less over the next few months and finally stopped.

== Early writing years ==
After quitting gambling, Petrakis embarked upon a series of odd jobs that he often quit. Lacking a high school diploma, he worked as a Railway Express baggage handler, a steel mill worker, a customer service rep at a manufacturer of auto waxes and furniture polishes, a beer truck driver, a clothes presser in a dry-cleaning plant, a real estate salesman, an advertising copywriter, and a junior-level speechwriter for executives at U.S. Steel. He also entered the restaurant business, owning and operating a small lunchroom at 13th Street and Indiana Avenue in Chicago called Art's Lunch.

At night, however, he would work on his writing. For 10 years he continually submitted manuscripts to various literary magazines that published short stories. Finally, in 1956, at the age of 33, he sold his first story. It was titled "Pericles on 31st Street" and was published by The Atlantic Monthly, which gave it one of its "Atlantic Firsts" awards. After that, Petrakis continued to publish in the Atlantic. In addition, he wrote "The Wooing of Ariadne" for The Saturday Evening Post and "Dark Eye" for Playboy. Another of his stories, "The Prison," won an O. Henry Award (1966); and, in addition, an anthology of his short stories with the title "Pericles on 31st Street" was named a finalist for the National Book Award for Fiction (1966).

=== A Dream of Kings ===
In 1966 Petrakis made his first international success with the appearance of his novel A Dream of Kings, which won him a nomination for the National Book Award for Fiction for the second year in a row. A Dream of Kings was on the New York Times Best Seller list for 12 weeks, translated into 12 languages, and made into a Hollywood film of the same name. The lead role of Leonidas Matsoukas was played by actor Anthony Quinn, already familiar to Americans from having played Zorba in the earlier film Zorba the Greek (1964). Quinn's characterization of Matsoukas as a passionate Greek immigrant full of lust for life was so like Zorba that he was termed by one critic "Zorba the Greek-American." The film of A Dream of Kings was released in 1969 by National General Pictures and was directed by Daniel Mann, who had previously worked with actors Burt Lancaster, Anna Magnani and Elizabeth Taylor.

== Middle period ==
A Dream of Kings had been published by the David McKay Company, which also published Petrakis's short story anthology The Waves of Night (1969). McKay also brought out his next novel, In the Land of Morning, It came out in 1973, when the Vietnam War was in the American news every night, and has as the central character a young Greek-American veteran coming back from Vietnam who is of the same generation as Petrakis's three sons (Mark, John and Dean). There then followed a period at the publishing house of Doubleday, which published four of Petrakis's books between 1976 and 1983. All four had Greek themes. The Hour of the Bell is set during the Greek War of Independence (1821–1932), in which patriotic Greek forces expelled the ruling Turks who had been there since the fall of Greece to the Ottoman Empire in the year 1453. As he wrote, Petrakis felt inspired:

The writing of that novel [The Hour of the Bell] provided me, to a greater degree than any other writing I had done before, the joy of being attuned to one's work. I felt myself part of some luminous confederacy that encompassed all the good poets and artists who had ever lived, an affiliation linked to some divinity in heaven or on earth. At odd times during the days and nights I worked on the book, words and phrases and scenes flew into my thoughts, seemingly unrelated to characters and scenes in the story. After a while I understood with a feeling of bewilderment and awe that another profound force than my own was directing my vision. The life of that book became more real to me then, while eating, drinking, walking and talking seemed a ghostly charade. I finally understood the emotion Martin Buber called "the holiness of an active relationship with God."

— Reflections: A Writer's Life, A Writer's Work, p. 6

Doubleday also published A Petrakis Reader (1978), an anthology of short stories with primarily Greek or Greek-American characters. At about this time Petrakis started making numerous public speaking appearances in which he would read his stories aloud. Doubleday also published Nick the Greek, the fictionalized life story of the legendary professional gambler Nick "The Greek" Dandolos; and Days of Vengeance, a historical novel of Cretan immigrant men working in the Utah coal mines in the early 1900s.

== Depression ==
In 1982 Petrakis underwent an illness and accompanying depression that almost ended his life. Following knee surgery for a tennis injury, he developed a drop foot. He became anxious and made the rounds of the neurologists. One diagnosed him with ALS (Lou Gehrig's disease). Not yet knowing that the ALS diagnosis would prove to be incorrect, Petrakis decided he would not wait passively for the crippling decay of the disease. He bought a gun, thinking to kill himself. The night he intended to do it, however, a last-minute phone call to his wife made him long for a few more hours with her before the end. From that point, his depression began to lift. As part of his gradual ascent toward recovery, Petrakis talked and wrote much about his illness, which did not turn out to be ALS. For example, he described his depression to the Chicago Tribune in a 1990 interview titled "A Writer's Odyssey." And when he wrote Ghost of the Sun, the 1990 sequel to A Dream of Kings, he depicted all three of the neurologists visited by the now-old, now-sick Matsoukas as near-barbarians.

== Later writings ==
In the 2000s Petrakis began writing for Southern Illinois University Press. They published his Twilight of the Ice, about the days when Americans still had ice delivered to the iceboxes in their homes; The Orchards of Ithaca, in which a Greek restaurateur comes to the defense of a Greek Orthodox priest falsely accused of child molestation; The Shepherds of Shadows, a sequel to The Hour of the Bell; and Legends of Glory and other stories, a collection of short stories centering on Chicago Greeks. His final short story anthology was Cavafy's Stone and other village tales (Wicker Park Press, 2010), all of whose stories take place in the same fictional village in Greece. As of 2015, Petrakis was still producing work regularly. His final book was a full-length autobiography, Song of My Life.

== Awards and honors ==
- "Atlantic First" Award (1957)
- Benjamin Franklin Citation (1957)
- Friends of American Writers Award (1964)
- Friends of Literature Award (1964)
- Society of Midland Authors Award (1964)
- O. Henry Award (1966). For his short story "The Prison," available in the anthology Prize Stories 1966.
- Finalist, National Book Award for Fiction (1966). For the short story collection Pericles on 31st Street.
- Finalist, National Book Award for Fiction (1967). For the novel A Dream of Kings.
- Writer-in-Residence, Chicago Public Library (1976–1977)
- Writer-in-Residence, Chicago Board of Education (1978)
- Carl Sandburg Award (1983). Lifetime achievement award given to a Chicago author by the Chicago Public Library.
- Gabby Award for Arts & Culture (2009)
- Nikos Kazantzakis Award for the Arts, Pancretan Association (2013)
- Fuller Lifetime Achievement Award, Chicago Literary Hall of Fame (2014)
- Honorary Doctor of Humane Letters from the American College of Greece. Five additional honorary doctorates from Hellenic College, the University of Illinois, Indiana University Northwest, Roosevelt University, and Governors State University.

== Bibliography ==
=== Novels ===
- Lion at My Heart (1959). Boston: Little, Brown.
- The Odyssey of Kostas Volakis (1963). New York: David McKay.
- A Dream of Kings (1966). New York: David McKay.
- In the Land of Morning (1973). New York: David McKay.
- The Hour of the Bell: a novel of the Greek War of Independence against the Turks (1976). Garden City, NY: Doubleday.
- Nick the Greek (1979). Garden City, NY: Doubleday.
- Days of Vengeance (1983). Garden City, NY: Doubleday.
- Ghost of the Sun (1990), sequel to A Dream of Kings. New York: St. Martin's Press.
- Twilight of the Ice (2003). Carbondale, IL: Southern Illinois University Press.
- The Orchards of Ithaca (2004). Carbondale, IL: Southern Illinois University Press.
- The Shepherds of Shadows (2008), sequel to The Hour of the Bell. Carbondale, IL: Southern Illinois University Press.

=== Short story collections ===
- Pericles on 31st Street (1965). Chicago: Quadrangle Books.
- A Petrakis Reader (1978). Garden City, NY: Doubleday.
- The Waves of Night, and other stories (1969). New York: David McKay Company.
- Collected Stories (1987) Chicago: Lake View Press.
- Legends of Glory and other stories (2007). Carbondale, IL: Southern Illinois University Press.
- Cavafy's Stone and other village tales (2010). Chicago: Wicker Park Press.

=== Autobiographical works ===
- Stelmark: A Family Recollection (1970). New York: David McKay. Re-released (in 1983) as part of Reflections.
- Reflections: A Writer's Life, A Writer's Work (1983). Chicago: Lake View Press. Contains Stelmark and Journal of a Novel.
- Tales of the Heart: Dreams and Memories of a Lifetime (1999). Chicago: Ivan R. Dee.
- Journal of a Novel (2012). Chesterton, IN: Duneland Books. Previously published in Reflections.
- Song of My Life (2014). Columbia, SC: University of South Carolina Press.

=== Other nonfiction ===
- The Founder's Touch: The Life of Paul Galvin of Motorola (1965). New York: McGraw-Hill.
- Henry Crown: The Life and Times of the Colonel (1998). Co-authored with David B. Weber. Chicago: Henry Crown & Company.
- Reach Out: The Story of Motorola and Its People (2003). Kingsport, TN: Quebecor World/Kingsport.
