= Berta Sieradzki =

Canadian centenarian

Berta Korngut Sieradzki
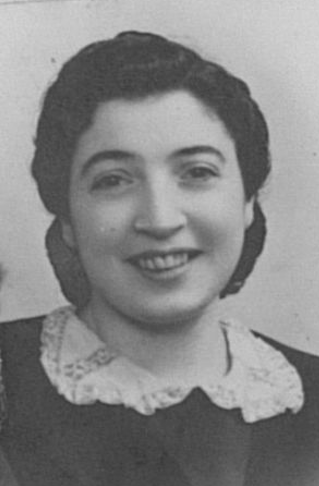
- Born: Berta Korngut; December 14, 1911; Berlin, Germany
- Died: September 23, 2019 (aged 107); Montreal, Quebec, Canada
- Other name: Berta Szydlow
- Occupation: Baker
- Known for: centenarian
- Spouse(s): Victor Sieradzki, Mendel Szydlow
- Children: 1

Berta Sieradzki (December 14, 1911 - September 23, 2019) was a German-born Jewish Canadian centenarian. At the time of her death, she was one of the oldest people in Montreal.

== Early life and the Second World War ==
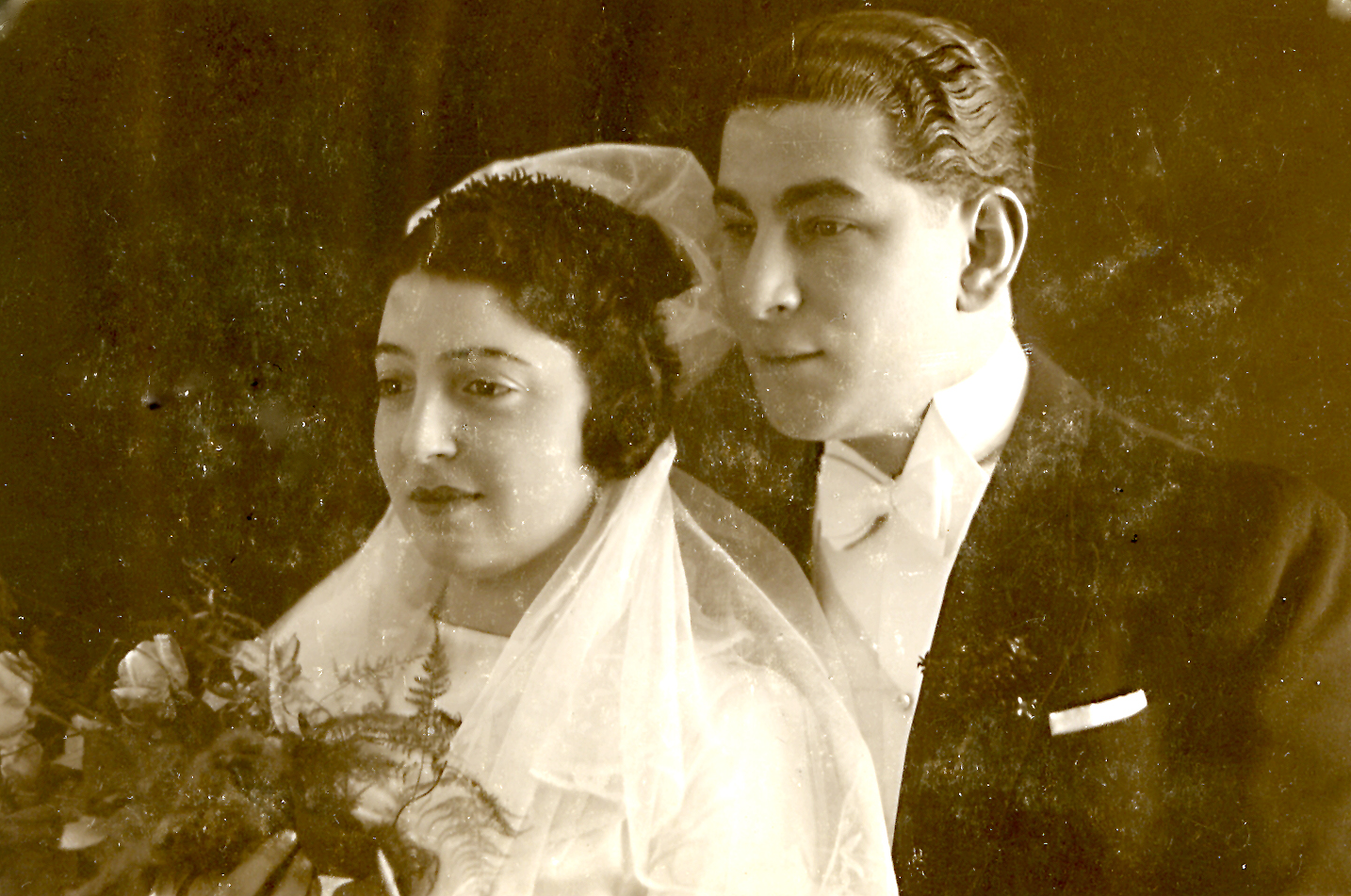
Berta Korngut and Mendel Szydlow on their wedding day in 1935 in Berlin, Germany.

Berta Sieradzki was born in 1911 as Berta Korngut. Her parents were Chaim Hersch Korngut and Rosa Rachel Blumenstock, a Jewish family originally from Poland. In Berlin, Sieradzki worked as a bank teller, and eventually married Mendel Szydlow. In 1939, the couple fled from Berlin to Antwerp, with the intention to go to the United States or England. Shortly before their expected immigration, the war broke out and their entry to England was blocked. Sieradzki and her husband then decided to stay in Antwerp, where, in 1940, their son Werner Szydlow was born. On September 12, 1942, Sieradzki's husband Mendel Szydlow was arrested on the street in Antwerp and deported to Auschwitz-Birkenau, where he was murdered. Sieradzki suffered from tuberculosis, and was admitted to the Sint-Erasmus hospital in Borgerhout (Antwerp), where she survived the rest of the war. Her son, Werner Szydlow, also survived the war.

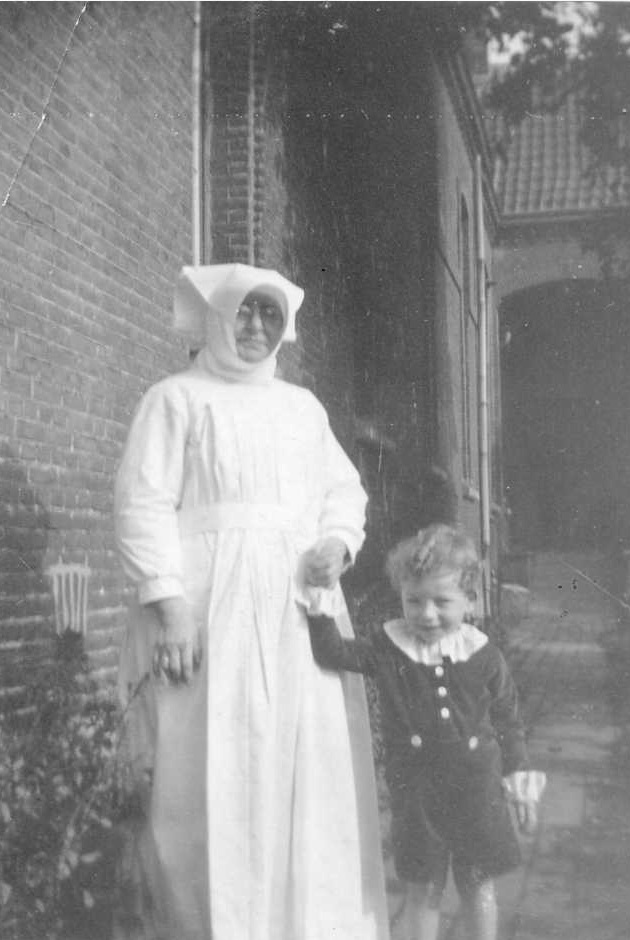
Son Werner Szydlow with the head nurse in the Sint-Erasmus hospital in Borgerhout, Antwerp, during World War II.

== Later life ==
After the war, Sieradzki married the widowed Victor (Wigdor) Sieradzki, a Holocaust survivor who was a prisoner in Auschwitz for more than two years, and who had lost his wife and a son. Sieradzki and her husband started a Belgian pastry shop. In 1954, the family moved from Antwerp, Belgium to Montreal, Canada, where she lived till her death in 2019. She was 107 years old.
