= Maurice Schwartz =

American actor and director

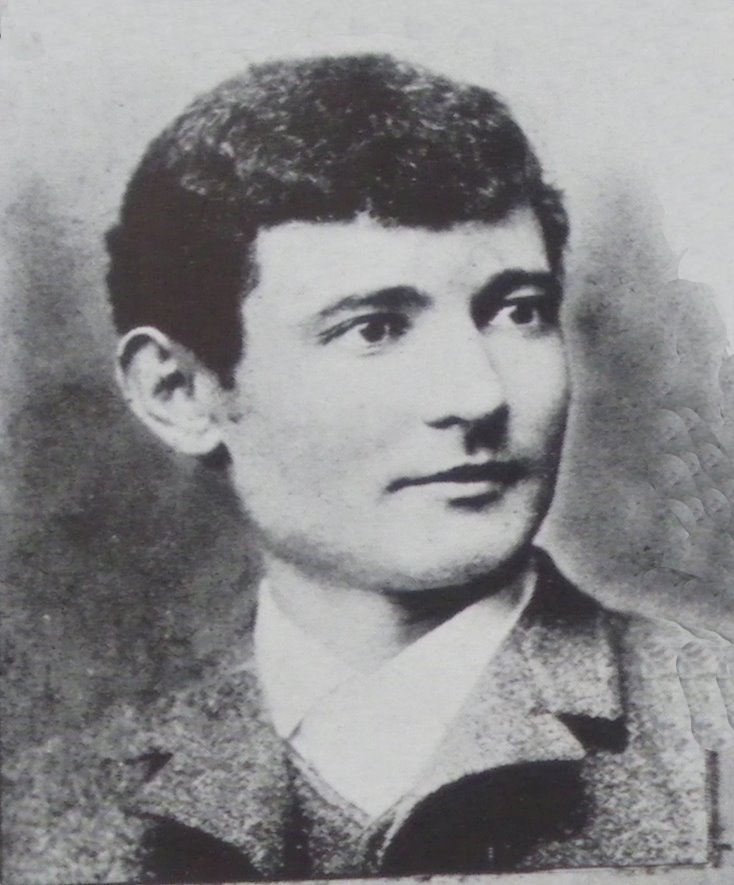
- Born: Avrom Moishe Schwartz; June 18, 1890; Sudylkiv, Ukraine, Russian Empire
- Died: May 10, 1960 (aged 69); Beilinson Hospital, Petah Tikva, Israel
- Occupations: Actor, film director, film producer, theatrical producer, screenwriter and theatre director
- Years active: 1910–53 (film)
- Spouse(s): 1) Eva Rafalo; divorced. 2) Anna Bordofsky
- Children: 2

Maurice Schwartz, born Avram Moishe Schwartz (June 18, 1890 – May 10, 1960), born in the Volhynia province of the Russian Empire, was a stage and film actor active in the United States. He founded the Yiddish Art Theatre and its associated school in 1918 in New York City and was its theatrical producer and director. He also worked in Hollywood, mostly as an actor in silent films but also as a film director, producer, and screenwriter.

== Early life and education ==
Schwartz was born Avrom Moishe Schwartz in Sudylkiv, Ukraine, then in the Russian Empire, to Isaac, a grain dealer, and his wife Rose (née Bernholtz) Schwartz, a Jewish family. Moishe was the oldest of three boys among the six siblings, and had three older sisters. Like many similar families, the Schwartzes immigrated to the United States in stages. In 1898 Isaac Schwartz emigrated with his three teen-aged daughters, so they could all work to get started in New York and earn money for passage for Rose and their three young sons.

The following year he sent tickets for his wife and the boys. They got as far as Liverpool, where they were to sail for the U.S., but got separated. Rose was forced to leave without Moishe. Without any English, he made his way to London, where he lived for two years, surviving with the help of strangers. His father located him in 1901, and they traveled together to New York when Moishe was twelve.

Upon rejoining his family in New York City's Lower East Side, Schwartz took the first name of Morris. His father enrolled him in the Baron de Hirsch school, founded to teach Jewish immigrants. After school he worked in his father's small factory recycling rags for the clothing industry. When an uncle introduced him to Yiddish theatre, Schwartz was captivated. At that time groups of boys and young men were partisans of different theatres and actors. Schwartz, who admired the actors David Kessler and Jacob Adler, began reading widely, especially classic plays by such authors as William Shakespeare and Henrik Ibsen.

Because his Orthodox father opposed his desire to act, Schwartz left home and took a variety of jobs to support himself before finally finding work as an actor. He joined various traveling theater troupes, including one that toured the Midwest. On his return to New York City in 1907, he found his heroes, Kessler and Adler, continuing to rise in their profession. Soon Schwartz obtained a contract with Michael Thomashevsky's Green Street Theatre in Philadelphia.

== Marriage and family ==
Schwartz was briefly married to Eva Rafalo, a contralto singer born in Cincinnati, Ohio, whom he met while touring with an acting company. {citation: Marriage: "Ohio, U.S., County Marriage Records, 1774-1993" Original data: Marriage Records. Ohio Marriages. Various Ohio County Courthouses Ancestry Record 61378 #900618693 (accessed 10 June 2024) Eva Rafalo (23), daughter of Isaac Rafalo & Bertha Sclovsky, marriage to Morris Schwartz on 11 Jul 1911 in Hamilton, Ohio, USA. } They were divorced by 1911, after which he returned full-time to New York. Eva and her older sister Clara Rafalo were both actresses in the Yiddish theatre. After the divorce, Eva married Henry (Zvi Hersch) Fishman, another actor on the Yiddish stage.{{Citation needed Marriage: "Indiana, U.S., Marriage Index, 1800-1941" Works Progress Administration; Index to Marriage Records: Indiana Works Progress Administration, 1938-1940; Series Title: Lake County Indiana;index to Marriage Record 1850 - 1920 Inclusive Vol W. P. A. Original Record Located: County Clerk's O; Book: U; Page: 230 Ancestry Record 5059 #2335335 (accessed 10 June 2024) Eva Rafalo marriage to Harry Fishman on 31 Mar 1913 in Lake, Indiana, USA.|date=December 2023}}

In 1914 Schwartz married Anna Bordofsky, a 24-year-old woman from Brest-Litovsk, Belarus, who had been in the United States about a decade. She was initially involved with Kessler's Yiddish theater as well. She became his business partner, helping run the theatre. They remained married until Schwartz's death.

In 1947 the couple adopted two Polish Jewish war orphans, Moses and Fannie Englander, aged 9- and 8-years old, respectively. After losing their parents Abraham Joseph and Chana Englander in 1942, the children had been placed by the underground with Belgian Christian families. Fannie was renamed Marcelle and grew up with Maurice and Denise Vander Voordt as the only parents she really knew. The Vander Voordts protected her as their own during the German occupation. She spoke only French.

After the war, Jewish groups had worked to reunite families and place Jewish orphans with Jewish families. Schwartz met the boy Moses at the Wezembeek Orphanage in Belgium in 1946 while on a theatrical tour for displaced persons. He arranged to adopt Moses and his sister through the American Jewish Joint Distribution Committee (JDC), which had located Fannie and brought the siblings together. The Schwartzes met Fannie for the first time when she arrived with her brother at La Guardia Airport. They renamed the children Marvin (or Norman) and Risa. In New York, they taught them Yiddish and English, and about Judaism. Risa became an actress in the United States, most commonly known for her role in The Tenth Man (Chayefsky play) as Evelyn Foreman.

== Career ==
=== Theatre ===
Schwartz started acting early, working for six years in companies and locations outside New York: the Midwest and Philadelphia. In 1911 he was hired by David Kessler for his company at his Second Avenue Theatre. In 1913, he gained a Hebrew Actors Union card, having to take the test twice and do some politicking with influential leaders, such as Abe Cahan, editor of The Jewish Forward, to get voted in. After a total of six years with Kessler, Schwartz had other ambitions to pursue.

In 1918, Schwartz founded the Yiddish Art Theatre, taking a lease on the Irving Place Theatre, in the Union Square neighborhood in New York City. He had ambitions for a people's theater that would produce classic, literary works. As he announced in Der Tog (The Day), a Yiddish-language newspaper, he wanted "a company that will be devoted to performing superior literary works that will bring honor to the Yiddish Theatre."

Believing that an actor needed to develop by taking on a wide variety of roles, the next year he founded an associated school. He wanted to nurture talent by giving students chances to learn: he felt that taking on 25 roles would teach someone much about "the possibilities of voice, gesture and make-up." Among the actors Schwartz helped develop were Paul Muni, who played 40 roles in his productions. Schwartz said of Muni in a 1931 interview: "He is a sincere actor. The theatre is more to him than just a job."

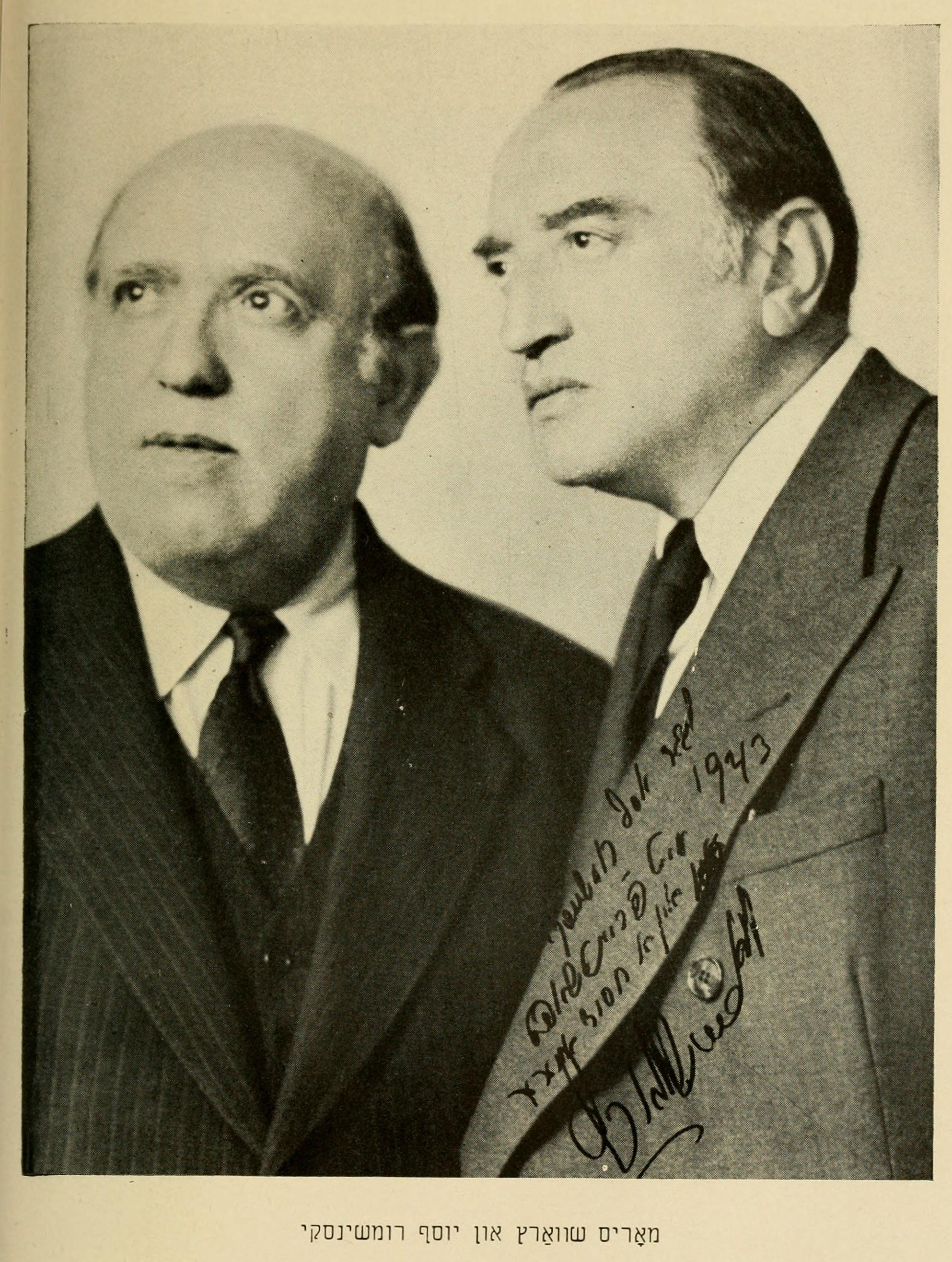
Maurice Schwartz and Joseph Rumshinsky

The Yiddish Art Theatre operated for more than three decades, until 1950, performing a rotating repertoire of 150 plays, including classics of Yiddish, European, and English theatre, ranging from works by Sholem Aleichem to William Shakespeare. Schwartz took his company on a tour to Europe in 1924 and to South America in 1929.

Schwartz's most lauded featured roles were as "Reb Malech" in Israel Joshua Singer's Yoshe Kalb, "Luka" in Maxim Gorki's The Lower Depths, Oswald in Henrick Ibsen's Ghosts, Shylock in William Shakespeare's The Merchant of Venice, at the Palace Theatre, and the title role in King Lear. At the time that he appeared in the Yiddish film Uncle Moses, in 1932, he was billed as the "greatest of all Yiddish actors", and in that era was also called the "Olivier of the Yiddish stage".

By the 1930s, the Yiddish theater was declining as Jews became more assimilated and audiences decreased. In an interview in 1931, Schwartz said, "The Jewish stage was once a night school to which people came to learn the language [English]. Now Jewish playwrights are confused. They cannot go back to the old themes because the Americanized Jew does not know that life, and they have not sufficiently assimilated the life here to understand and write about it." In the same interview, he said, "The theatre is my life. It is the only interest I have."

Schwartz also performed in English on Broadway and in other venues. In 1928 he appeared on Broadway in The Inspector General and Anathema. Between 1931 and 1952, he appeared in four Broadway-theatre productions in New York City, some of which he produced, and produced others. For example, in 1931 he appeared on Broadway at the Forty-ninth Street Theatre in Ernst Toller's Expressionist play, Bloody Laughter (Hinkemann). (It had been produced in the UK in a cockney English version, and in Yiddish entitled The Red Laugh. Schwartz commissioned a translation for the New York production.) Related to German expressionism and the First World War, the play was not well received. Schwartz later traveled to the new nation of Israel and performed on stage there.

=== Film ===
With his successes as an actor, Schwartz was also drawn to Hollywood, appearing in his first silent film in 1910. He appeared in more than twenty films between 1910 and 1953; the majority were silents. He also wrote, produced, or directed several films.

Among his major roles in motion pictures were in Broken Hearts (1926), Uncle Moses (1932), Tevya (1939), Mission to Moscow (1943), and as Ezra in the Biblical drama Salome (1953).

== Death ==
He died following a heart attack in Beilinson Hospital in Petah Tikva, Israel near Tel Aviv. He is buried in the Yiddish-theatre section of the Mount Hebron Cemetery in the Flushing neighborhood of Queens, a borough of New York City.

== Filmography ==
Year	Title	Role	Notes
1924	Jiskor	Leibke	
1926	Broken Hearts	Benjamin Rezanov	
1932	Uncle Moses	Moses	
1936	The Man Behind the Mask	The Master	
1939	Tevya	Tevya 'Tevye'	
1943	Mission to Moscow	Dr. Botkin	
1951	Bird of Paradise	The Kahuna	
1953	Salome	Ezra	
1953	Slaves of Babylon	The Prophet Daniel	his final film role.
