= Fred J. Kader =

Retired pediatric neurologist, Holocaust survivor (1938–2024)

Fred Jeruzalski Kader
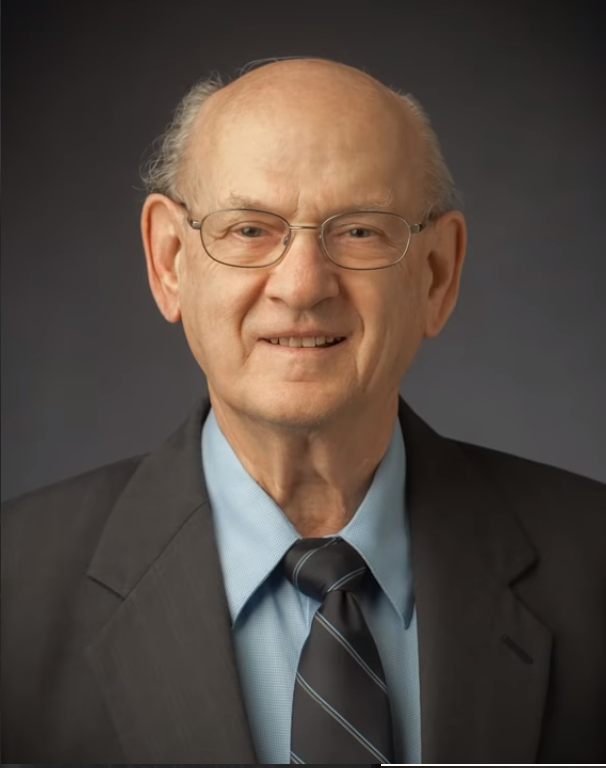
- Born: Frans Jeruzalski; July 21, 1938; Antwerp, Belgium
- Died: June 19, 2024 (aged 85); Omaha, Nebraska, U.S.
- Education: McGill University, Johns Hopkins University, Albert Einstein College of Medicine
- Known for: Pediatric neurologist, Holocaust survivor and educator
- Medical career
- Profession: Doctor
- Field: Pediatric neurology for children
- Institutions: Jewish General Hospital, Montreal General Hospital, Albert Einstein College of Medicine, University of British Columbia, Children's Hospital & Medical Center, University of Nebraska Medical Center

Fred Jeruzalski Kader (July 21, 1938 – June 19, 2024) was a Belgian-American pediatric neurologist, Holocaust survivor and educator in the region of Omaha, Nebraska.

His parents, Jacob Jeruzalski (1896–1942) and Basza-Ryfka Krysztal (1906–1942), were Jews from Poland who had migrated to Belgium. Kader was the sole Holocaust survivor of his family. His parents, two older brothers, his half-brother and half-sister were murdered in Auschwitz-Birkenau. Kader's younger sister had died prior to the deportations in Antwerp of natural causes. During the summer of 1942, Kader's father was sent from Antwerp to labor camps in Northern France, where he was forced to work for Organisation Todt. After the arrest of his mother in September 1942, Kader was brought to the children's home Meisjeshuis (Antwerp). On October 30, 1942, the German Sicherheitspolizei und Sicherheitsdienst arrested Kader and several other orphans in the children's home. He was taken to the Mechelen transit camp to be deported but was rescued by a 10-year-old boy named Marcel Chojnacki who, like Kader, was an orphaned Jewish child. Kader was then brought to the Jewish orphanage in Wezembeek-Ophem, where he survived the remainder of the war. Kader died on June 19, 2024, at the age of 85.

== Education and medical career ==
In 1949, Kader migrated from Belgium to Montreal, Canada, where he was taken in by the family of his great-aunt. He studied at McGill University, Johns Hopkins University and Albert Einstein College of Medicine, and specialized in pediatric neurology for children. After having worked at the University of British Columbia, Kader moved to Omaha in 1974, where he became one of the first pediatric neurologists in the region. In 2018, Kader was awarded by the Children's Hospital & Medical Center and University of Nebraska Medical Center for his 44 years of service as a pediatric neurologist for children, and was named a Pediatric Legend.

As one of the few Holocaust survivors in Omaha, Kader frequently educated children in the region about his Holocaust experiences.
