= Uncle Moses =

Yiddish American Film

- Directed by: Sidney M. Goldin; Aubrey Scotto
- Written by: Maurice Schwartz (screenplay)
- Based on: Uncle Moses by Sholem Asch
- Produced by: Yiddish Talking Pictures, Inc.
- Starring: Maurice Schwartz; Judith Abarbanel; Zvee Scooler
- Edited by: Bob Snody
- Production companies: Yiddish Talking Pictures, Inc.
- Release date: April 20, 1932
- Running time: 87 min
- Country: United States
- Languages: Yiddish; English

Uncle Moses (Yiddish: אָנקל מאָזעס) is a 1932 American Yiddish drama film directed by Sidney M. Goldin and Aubrey Scotto. The film is an adaptation of the novel of the same name by Yiddish writer Sholem Asch. It was adapted by and stars Maurice Schwartz in the titular role.

== Plot ==
Set in New York City’s Lower East Side, the film follows "Uncle" Moses Melnick (Maurice Schwartz), a former peddler turned wealthy garment factory owner. He employs many of his landsleit (fellow Jewish immigrants from Kuźmina) but exerts control over them in a paternalistic and domineering manner, aided by his nephew and fixer, Sam (Sam Gertler).

Uncle Moses becomes infatuated with teenaged Masha (Judith Abarbanel), the daughter of one of his employees, after she confronts him about her father’s mistreatment. To win her over, he lavishes Masha and her parents with expensive gifts. Though reluctant, Masha ultimately agrees to marry him.

As Moses focuses on Masha, Charlie (Zvee Scooler), a young Marxist and Masha’s admirer, organizes a strike at the factory. Sam suppresses the strike violently, and a settlement is eventually reached with the workers.

After their marriage, Masha gives birth to a son but grows increasingly unhappy. Moses grants her a divorce, allowing her and the child to move to Europe. With Sam now in control of the factory, a frail and lonely Moses spends his days reminiscing and singing with the workers, echoing the life of his own father.

== Cast ==
- Maurice Schwartz as Uncle Moses
- Judith Abarbanel as Masha
- Zvee Scooler as Charlie
- Sam Gertler as Sam
- Mark Scweid as Aaron Melnick
- Sally Schor as Rosie Melnick
- Rubin Goldberg as Alter Melnick

== Production ==
The story originally appeared serialized in The Forward and was published as a book in 1918. It was adapted for the stage by Schwartz for the Yiddish Art Theater's 1930-1931 season (one of ten Yiddish Art Theater productions based on Asch stories), and the screenplay was largely unchanged from the stage production. Some plot changes were made from the original novel: in the film Uncle Moses agrees to let Masha return to Europe, whereas the novel has her leaving without notice, but likely still in the New York area. Moses is left to contemplate his solitude at his first wife's grave.

The dialog is mostly in Yiddish, though English is used throughout, reflecting the reality of Eastern European Jewish immigrant life in New York City at the time. Similarly, the title is a transliteration into Yiddish from English (Onkel Mozes, אָנקל מאָזעס), as opposed to the translation, which would be Feter Moishe (פֿעטער משה).

With the exception of the opening tracking shot down Orchard Street, the film was entirely photographed at Metropolitan Studios in Fort Lee, NJ. Rubin Goldberg, who portrays Uncle Moses's father, produced the film.

== Reception & Legacy ==
Uncle Moses was released in three theaters in New York City in April 1932 and was generally well received by contemporary audiences. In an original review, E. Fleishman, writing for Der Tog, described it as the "first good Yiddish 'talkie'" ('ערשטע גוטע אידישע 'טאָקי, ershte gute idishe 'toki'). Fleishman praised Schwartz's performance, describing it as "as fresh, alive and effective as it was in the same role on the stage" (אַזױ פריש, לעבעדיג און עפעקטפול, װי ער איז דאָס געװען אין דערזעלבער ראָל אױף דער ביהנע).

Subsequent evaluations of the film note its importance as the first Yiddish sound film to deal with contemporaneous social themes. Schwartz's acting continued to be lauded, with Janet Maslin, for the New York Times, writing that "Schwartz makes Uncle Moses a remarkably lifelike and immediate figure, a man whose vanity, pride and inner doubts are as believable now as they were when the film was made. The actor's authority is unmistakable, as is the humanity that keeps 'Uncle Moses' from descending into caricature."

The film was restored by the National Center for Jewish Film in 1998 and has subsequently been shown in several film festivals.
