= Moshe Chaim Ephraim of Sudilkov =

- Title: Reb Ephraim

Personal life
- Born: רבי משה חיים אפרים; Moshe Chaim Ephraim; 1748 Medzhybizh
- Died: 17 Iyyar (May 12) 1800 Medzhybizh
- Buried: Medzhybizh
- Spouse: Yetel
- Children: Yaakov Yechiel, Yitzchok, Yosef
- Parents: Rabbi Yechiel Mikhl Ashkenazi (father); Udl (mother)

Religious life
- Religion: Judaism
- Main work: דגל מחנה אפרים; Degel Machaneh Ephraim "Banner of the Camp of Ephraim"

Moshe Chaim Ephraim, also known as Ephraim of Sudilkov, was born in Medzhybizh, Poland 1748 and died there on the 17th of Iyar in 1800. He was best known as the Baal Shem Tov's grandson and for the work Degel Machaneh Ephraim, first published in Korets, 1810.

== His life ==
Moshe Chaim Ephraim was one of three sons of Udl, the beloved daughter of Rabbi Israel "Baal Shem Tov." Brought up in the household of the Baal Shem Tov, at five years-old he was referred to as a great genius ("ilui gadol b'tachlis halimud") by his grandfather. After the Baal Shem Tov's death in 1760, he studied under R. Dov Ber the Maggid of Mezerich and under R. Yaakov Yosef of Polonoye. Afterwards, he settled in Sudilkov (near Shepetivka) in 1780 where he served as Maggid until 1785. In 1785, he returned to Medzhybizh and served as rebbe there until 1800 when he died. He is buried next to his grandfather, the Baal Shem Tov.

In many ways, Moshe Chaim was the exact opposite of his brother, R. Boruch of Medzhybizh. Moshe Chaim was quiet, studious and reflective, and lived his life in utter poverty. His work Degel Machaneh Ephraim was published by his son Yaakov Yechiel in 1810 in Korets. A classic of Chasidic literature, it contains discussions about each of the weekly Torah portions based upon the teachings of the Baal Shem Tov and his other teachers. It also contains a recording of his dreams from 1780 to 1786. The work is considered a primary source in the understanding of the ideology of the Baal Shem Tov. (This is not to be confused with another work entitled Machane Ephraim, written by Ephraim ben Jacob HaKohen, a 17th-century Lithuanian talmudist.)
