= Sint-Erasmus hospital in Borgerhout (Antwerp) =

Former hospital in Borgerhout, Antwerp

Sint-Erasmus hospital, Antwerp
- Sint-Erasmusgasthuis, Antwerpen

General information
- Location: Antwerp, Belgium, Fonteinstraat 33

The Sint-Erasmus hospital is a former hospital that was located at 33 Fonteinstraat in Antwerp, Belgium. In Dutch, it was known as Sint-Erasmusgasthuis.

== Second World War ==
In August 1942, Antwerp Governor Jan Grauls declared, by order of the occupying authorities, that the Sint-Erasmus hospital was the only hospital in Antwerp in which it was still allowed to treat Jewish patients. In addition to this, Jewish doctors were the only doctors who were allowed to treat Jewish patients, with the exception of life-threatening cases. The hospital had a closed ward, reserved for the care of Jews. In all other municipal and private hospitals and sanatoriums, it became forbidden to treat Jews.

=== Hidden Jewish children ===
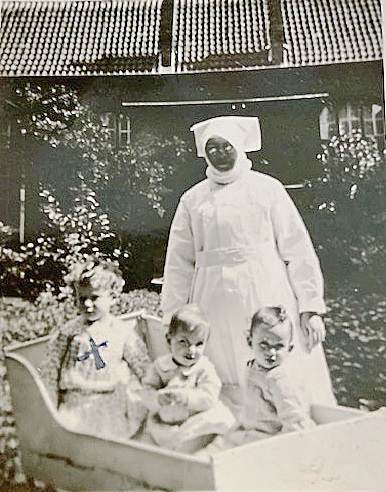
Hidden Jewish children at the Sint-Erasmus hospital during the Second World War. The boy on the left is Werner Szydlow. The boy in the middle is Bill Frankenstein (born as Bernard Baron).

On September 21, 1942, the German Sicherheitspolizei und Sicherheitsdienst (Sipo-SD) raided three Antwerp orphanages: Meisjeshuis (Antwerp), Pennsylvania Foundation and Jongenshuis. In Meisjeshuis, all 25 Jewish orphans who had already reached the age of five were arrested and taken to the Dossin barracks, the former transit camp in Mechelen. The entire group was deported and gassed upon arrival in Auschwitz-Birkenau. The youngest of 14 Jewish children of Meisjeshuis had not been arrested during a raid on September 21, 1942. They were still staying at the department of Kinderkribbe Good Engels. In a series of rescue actions, a total of 10 Jewish children were taken from there to the Sint-Erasmus hospital, where they all went into hiding. Among these children were Risa Schwartz and Jacques Weisser. Eventually, most of the Jewish children were found by the Germans and arrested in the hospital, but 9 out of the 10 rescued children survived the war.

Bill Frankenstein (born as Bernard Baron) and Werner Szydlow, two of the rescued children, described their stay in the hospital as follows:

'I remember hiding one time when the Nazis came. I was hidden in a closet and told to just stay there and not make a sound. I held onto my toy truck for dear life until it was over.' — Bill Frankenstein, ″From the Children's Home to the Gas Chamber: And how some avoided their fate.″ (2021)

'The caregivers felt that it was safer for us to hide among the dying patients in the hospital. I was very frightened by the sound of motorcycles and the truck and the shouting whenever the German razzias occurred in the hospital. I went running to the laundry room and hid among the soiled patients’ bed linen. It took a long time for me to surface from my hiding place.' — Werner Szydlow, ″From the Children's Home to the Gas Chamber: And how some avoided their fate.″ (2021)

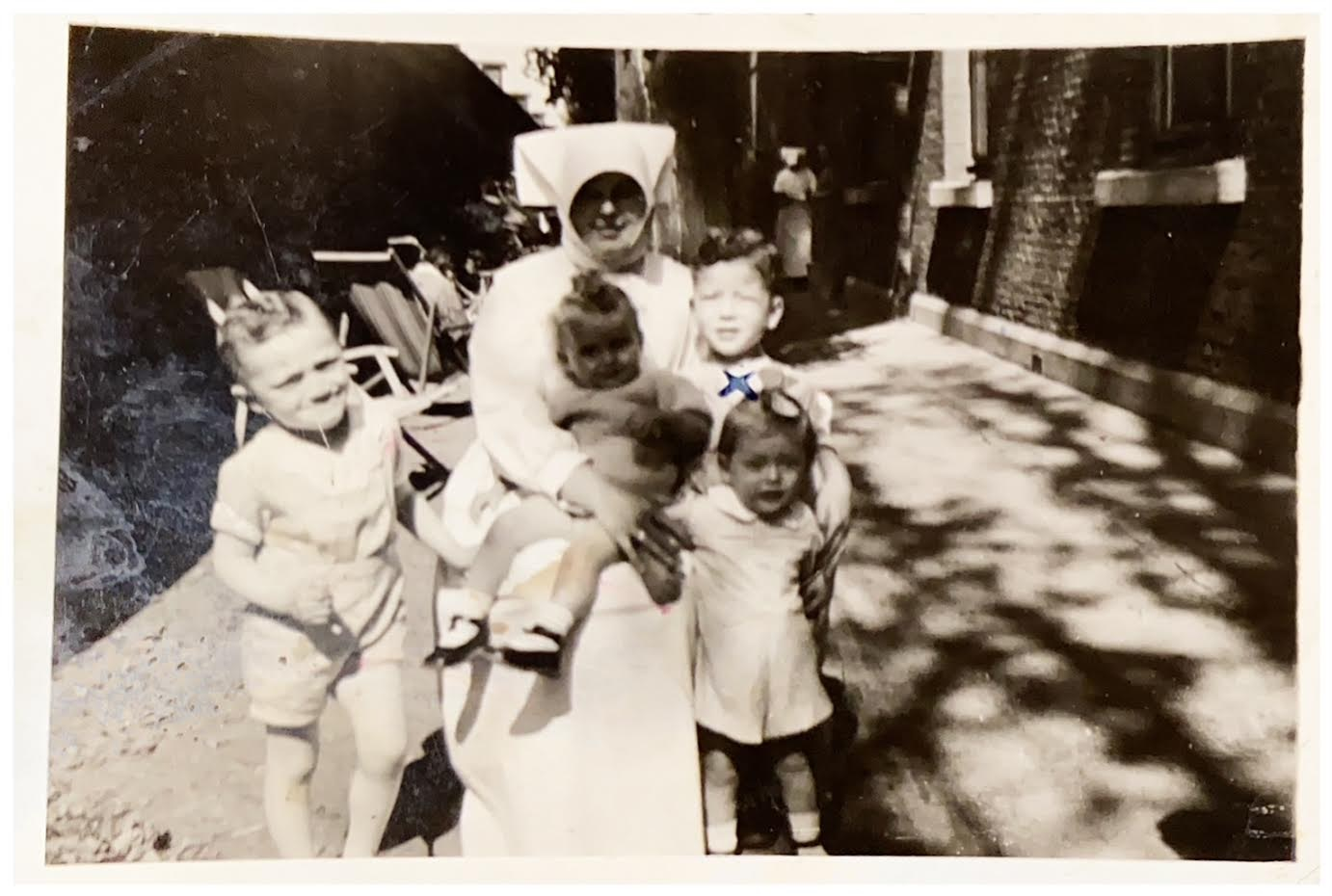
Some of the hidden Jewish children on hospital grounds with a nurse. The boy marked with an X is Werner Szydlow.

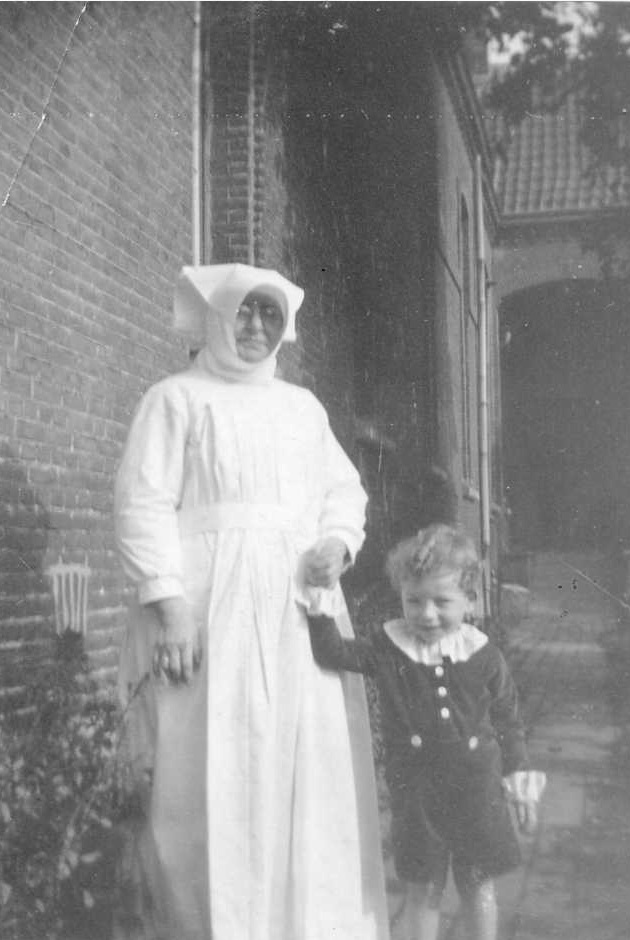
Werner Szydlow, one of the rescued children of Meisjeshuis, with the head nurse during his period in hiding in the Sint-Erasmus hospital in Borgerhout, Antwerp.

In October 1944, the hospital was damaged by V-bombs, and later, the building was demolished.
