= The Tenth Man (Chayefsky play) =

1959 American play by Paddy Chayefsky

- Original language: English
- Written by: Paddy Chayefsky

Premiere
- Date: 5 November 1959

The Tenth Man is a 1959 American play, adapted from The Dybbuk from S. Ansky. It had 623 performances over its year-and-a-half-long Broadway run.

== Cast ==
- Jacob Ben-Ami as Foreman
- Donald Harron as Arthur Landau
- Arnold Marlé as Hirshman
- George Voskovec as Alper
- Jack Gilford as Zitorsky
- Lou Jacobi as Schlissel
- Gene Saks as Rabbi
- Risa Schwartz as Evelyn Foreman
- David Vardi as Sexton
- Tim Callaghan as Policeman
- Martin Garner as Harris
- Alan Manson as Kessler Boy
- Paul Marin as Kessler Boy

== Plot ==
The play involves several elderly Jewish men from the old country, Russia, all members of a small synagogue in Mineola, Long Island. The play opens with the hapless Sexton's daily quest to gather ten males to constitute a minyan required in Jewish tradition to conduct a religious service. This search has suddenly become critical as the granddaughter of one of the men has apparently become possessed by the spirit of a dybbuk, an evil spirit. The grandfather leaves the girl sitting in the office of the temple's young rabbi, who is progressive and not likely to believe in the existence of evil spirits. The men then desperately begin to search for the necessary tenth man so they can hold the prayer service and attempt to exorcise the malevolent spirit. A young non-believing Jewish man wanders into the synagogue suffering a hangover from a night spent getting drunk. He sees the granddaughter sitting semi conscious and is moved and begins to fall in love. The older men are glad to welcome him because they now have the necessary ten males. The rabbi agrees to conduct the exorcism with the aid of an elderly robed man, the "cabalist" who had been praying in the temple.

== Reception ==
In The New York Times, Arthur Cantor wrote that The Tenth Man "marked a great leap forward from the easy naturalism of the first Chayefsky theater work [...] and displayed his gift for picturesque speech and penchant for themes of mysticism."

== Awards and nominations ==
=== Original Broadway production ===
Year	Award	Category	Nominee	Result
1960	Tony Award	Best Play		Nominated
1960	Tony Award	Best Direction of a Play	Tyrone Guthrie	Nominated
1960	Tony Award	Best Scenic Design	David Hays	Nominated

== See also ==
- Minyan
