= Meisjeshuis (Antwerp) =

Former children's home in Antwerp

Meisjeshuis Antwerp
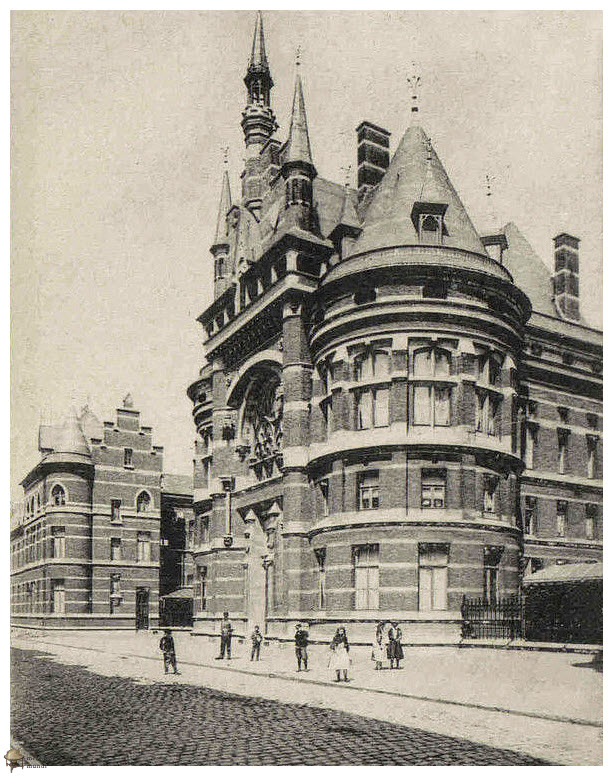
- Meisjeshuis, Albert Grisarstraat
- Interactive map of the Meisjeshuis Antwerp area

General information
- Location: Antwerp, Belgium, Albert Grisarstraat 17-23
- Coordinates: 51°12′03″N 4°25′09″E
- Completed: 1882

Design and construction
- Architect: Ernest Dieltiens

Meisjeshuis is a former children's home located at Albert Grisarstraat in Antwerp, Belgium. Throughout the years it has also been known as Adolf Stappaertsgasthuis and Algemeen Kinderziekenhuis Good-Engels.

== The building ==
The building of Meisjeshuis was designed in 1876 by architect Ernest Dieltiens. It consisted of a left wing, a central gatehouse and a right wing. The institute had four house numbers at Albert Grisarstraat, from number 17 to number 23. In total, the orphanage accommodated about 400 orphans. The children were divided into two departments: one for children over the age of five, and the other for children under five. The younger department was also known as Kinderkribbe Good Engels and was located in the right wing of the institute at number 23.

== Second World War ==
The history of the Jewish children of Meisjeshuis was researched by Reinier Heinsman, author of "From the Children's Home to the Gas Chamber: And how some avoided their fate." In September 1942, 39 Jewish orphans lived in Meisjeshuis. 25 of them were older than five, while the remaining 14 were younger than five. Only 13 of the 39 Jewish orphans of Meisjeshuis survived the war.

=== First raid ===
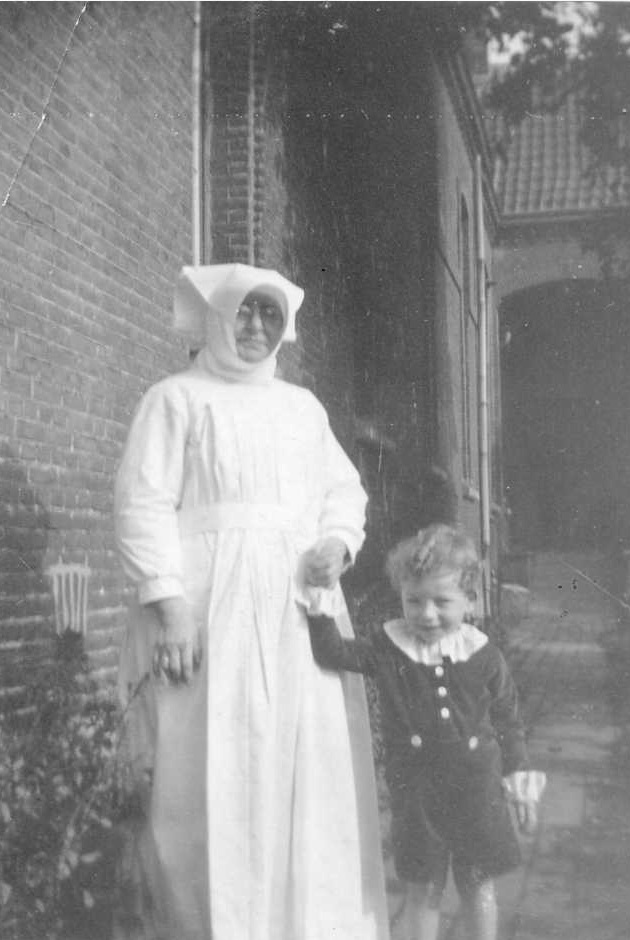
Werner Szydlow, one of the rescued children of Meisjeshuis, with the head nurse during his period in hiding in the Sint-Erasmus hospital in Borgerhout, Antwerp.

On September 21, 1942, the German Sicherheitspolizei und Sicherheitsdienst (Sipo-SD) raided three Antwerp orphanages: Meisjeshuis, Pennsylvania Foundation and Jongenshuis. In Meisjeshuis, all 25 Jewish orphans who had already reached the age of five were arrested and taken to the Dossin barracks, the former transit camp in Mechelen. On September 26, 1942 these 25 orphans were deported. The entire group was gassed upon arrival in Auschwitz-Birkenau on September 28, 1942.

=== Rescue actions ===
The youngest 14 Jewish children of Meisjeshuis had not been arrested during the raid on September 21, 1942. They were still staying at the department of Kinderkribbe Good Engels. Following a German order, the board of the orphanage was ordered ″not to allow the remaining Jewish children under 5 years of age, to be picked up by their parents or relatives and not to take in any more Jewish children.″ This order from the German Sipo-SD meant that the 14 remaining Jewish orphans could no longer leave the orphanage in the normal way. To circumvent this order, from September 21, 1942 to January 1943, a total of 10 of the 14 remaining Jewish children were rescued by the caregivers and hospitalized. They were taken to the Sint-Erasmus hospital in Borgerhout, where they all went into hiding. Werner Szydlow, one of the rescued children, described his stay in the hospital as follows:

'The caregivers felt that it was safer for us to hide among the dying patients in the hospital. My mother Berta Korngut was also there. I assume that other nurses besides the head nurse knew about a Jewish mother and son hiding in the hospital and kept that from the patients and not betrayed us when the numerous German razzias took place. I do not recall being kept in a special place within the building. On the contrary, I was free to run around in the corridors and wards. My mother never discussed our stay in the hospital, nor did she talk about anything in detail dealing with the horrors of the war. She could not get herself to talk about it. Whenever I inquired about my father or others who were deported, I would always hear “Du must es nicht wissen, sie sind alle tot….” You do not have to know, they are all dead!

My most vivid memory from my stay in the hospital was when I stood at the entrance to a large room and within it many flower arrangements, many people and many lit candles…. a new experience for me at the time. I was prevented from going inside by somebody who told me I was not allowed inside unless or until I said a prayer. I must have had a tantrum because two nuns had to drag me away from there. I believe I must have stumbled on a funeral service in a chapel.

After the war, when my mother found out that my father was not returning because he was killed in Auschwitz, she took me back to the Sint-Erasmus hospital. The purpose was to meet with the head nurse and to thank her for what she had done for us. It was a very emotional and tearful meeting for all of us. I remember thinking when looking at the nurse how old she looked. She told us that I was a very cheerful boy running around and jumping on the patients’ bed, something that brought some cheers to them. She also said that I was very frightened by the sound of motorcycles and the truck and the shouting whenever the German razzias occurred in the hospital. I went running to the laundry room and hid among the soiled patients’ bed linen. It took a long time for me to surface from my hiding place. I did have nightmares after the war at night for a very long time and jumped at the loud sound of trucks and motorcycles and loud screaming.' — Werner Szydlow, ″From the Children's Home to the Gas Chamber: And how some avoided their fate.″ (2021)

=== Second raid ===
On October 30, 1942, a second raid took place which targeted the Jewish orphans of Meisjeshuis. At the ward of Kinderkribbe Good Engels, 4 of the 14 orphans were arrested. The Nazis had taken note of the hospitalizations, and went to the Sint-Erasmus hospital to search for the hospitalized orphans. 3 of them were found and arrested in the hospital. The arrested orphans were taken to the Dossin barracks in Mechelen, where a major rescue operation, with the involvement of Yvonne Nèvejean and older Jewish orphans from the Jewish orphanage in Wezembeek (Belgium), saved them from deportation. Some of the rescuers were children themselves, including the then 14-year-old Leon Schipper, 10-year-old Marcel Chojnacki and 13-year-old Isabelle Pinkas Eisenman.

'In a dormitory we found several children. Every big child took a little one. Leon Schipper took Max Kohn. I took Annie Milerad. She was a very nice, beautiful baby.' — Isabelle Pinkas Eisenman, ″From the Children's Home to the Gas Chamber: And how some avoided their fate.″ (2021)

Of the 14 Jewish orphans at the department of Kinderkribbe Good Engels, 13 survived the war. In January 2021, the still-living orphans were reunited through Zoom, among them retired pediatric neurologist Fred J. Kader and Neodance creator Alfred Friedman.

=== List of the murdered Jewish children of Meisjeshuis ===
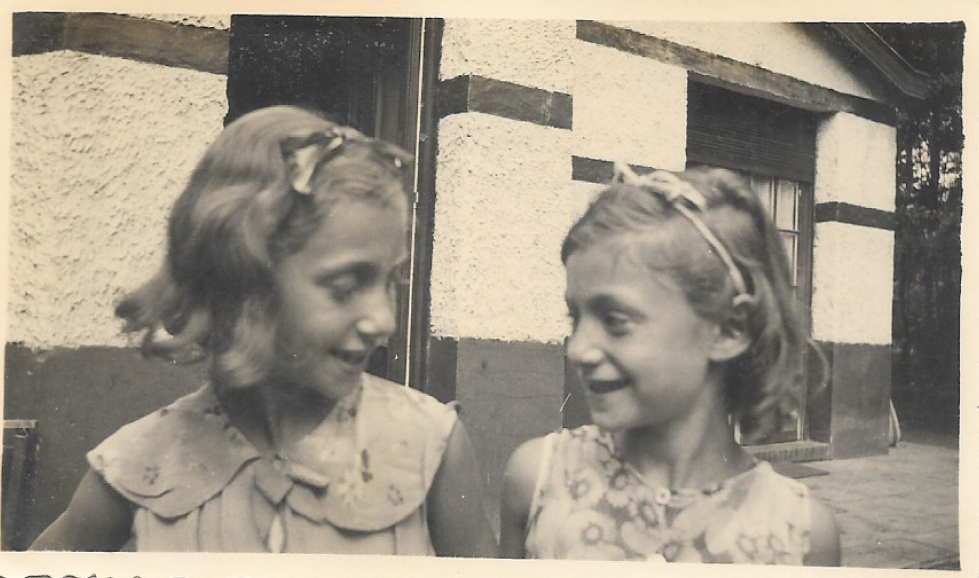
The sisters Estella Pelte (left) and Bella Pelte (right), two of the murdered orphans of Meisjeshuis.

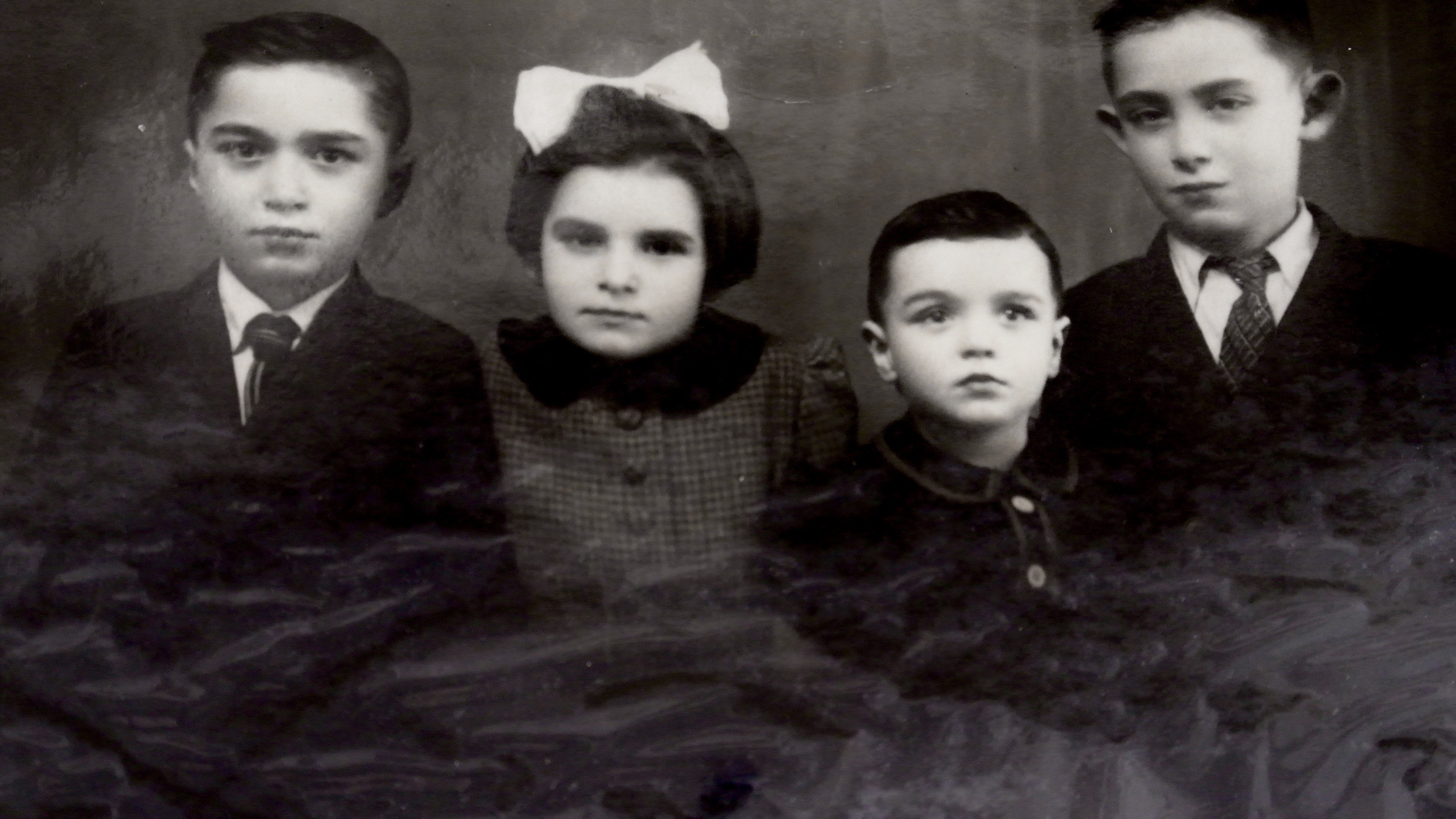
Siblings Morthe, Greta, Alfred and Zoltan Friedman in Antwerp. Greta was arrested at Meisjeshuis on September 21, 1942, while Morthe and Zoltan were arrested at Pennsylvania Foundation. Only Alfred survived the war.

Older department
Leon Bomblat
Simone Dorf
Greta Friedman
Esther Gluck
Salomon Gluck
Eva Gnieslaw
Ignace Jeruzalski
Paul Jeruzalski
Bertha Kohn
Bella Pelte
Estella Pelte
Maurice Pfefer
Fanny Rosenberg-Scharf
Max Schickler
Esther Ritmeester
Rebecca Szafir
Alida Szafir
Felicja Fajga Sztancer
Sarolta Markovicova
Fani Markovicova
Henriette Neuman
Judith Tajchman
Esther Tajchman
Frieda Tajchman
Isaac Zielonczyk
Younger department
Alfred Goldstein
