= Heinrich Conried =

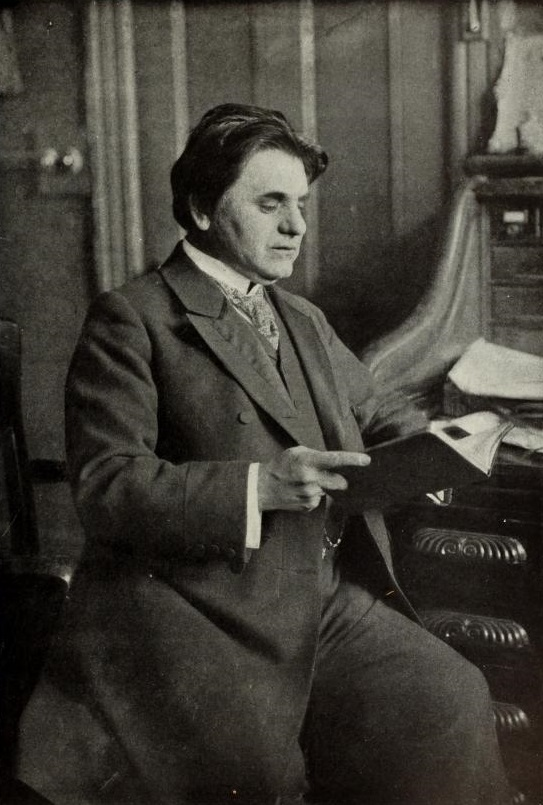

General Manager of the Metropolitan Opera
- In office 1903–1908
- Preceded by: Maurice Grau
- Succeeded by: Giulio Gatti-Casazza

Personal details
- Born: September 3, 1855 Bielitz, Austrian Silesia
- Died: April 27, 1909 (aged 53) Meran, Austria

Heinrich Conried (September 3, 1855 – April 27, 1909) was an Austrian and naturalized American theatrical manager and director. Beginning his career as an actor in Vienna, he took his first post as theater director at the Stadttheater Bremen in 1876. In 1878 he relocated to New York City where he remained for the rest of his career, serving initially as director of the Germania Theatre (1878-1881), followed by posts at the Thalia Theatre (1881-1882), New York Concert Company (1882-1883), and the Irving Place Theatre (1883-1903) In 1903 he became director of the Metropolitan Opera in New York City, a post he remained in until his retirement in 1908.

== Biography ==
He was born on September 3, 1855, in Bielitz, Austrian Silesia (now Poland). His father was a weaver of Jewish origin. He received his education at the Realschule in Vienna. Early on, he was an actor in at the Burgtheater in Vienna. Only 21 years old he became manager of the failed Stadttheater Bremen. His success in rescuing the theater not only moved the Senate of the city to pass a resolution thanking him, but also brought him to the attention of Adolf Neuendorff, who was the manager of the Germania Theatre in New York. On invitation of Neuendorff Conried moved in 1878 to New York City, where he became chief stage manager of the Germania Theatre. In 1881 he moved to the Thalia Theatre as artistic manager and in 1882 he became artistic manager of the New York Concert Company.

In 1883 Conreid assumed the management of the Irving Place Theatre where he worked for two decades. In 1903, he succeeded Maurice Grau as director of the Metropolitan Opera until 1908. His first season at the Met was notable through the first production of Parsifal outside of Bayreuth, against the wishes of Cosima Wagner, who went to court but failed in her attempt to forbid the production. By December 31, 1913, when the copyright of Parsifal expired, the work had been represented 43 times at the Metropolitan Opera.

Enrico Caruso, who until then had refused all offers to come to America, was persuaded by Conried to come to New York and sing at the Met.

Soon after Conreid had become director of the Metropolitan Opera, he conceived the New Theatre. His tenure was also marked by the United States premiere of Richard Strauss' Salome which was presented in “public rehearsal” on January 20, 1907, and at a benefit performance on January 22. The opera shocked the moral sensibilities of audiences and was met with disapproval, including many audience members walking out during the shocking final scene and with complaints to the company's board. The opera was pulled for the company's season and the Met did not actually stage the opera until 1934.

Also in 1907, Conreid notably poached Gustav Mahler from his conducting post in Vienna, and brought him in to lead the conducting staff at the Met; a position he remained in until leaving to become the director of the New York Philharmonic in 1909.

On May 1, 1908, Conreid retired from the Metropolitan Opera House due to his poor health. Immediately afterwards he voyaged to Europe. He died on April 27, 1909, in the Hotel Meranerhof in the city of Meran from an apoplectic stroke in the presence of his wife and sister. His funeral was held at the Metropolitan Opera House.
