= Tamara Daykarhanova =

Russian-born American actress and acting teacher (1889–1980)

Tamara Daykarhanova (1889–1980) was an actress and acting coach born in Moscow, Russia.

== Early life ==
She was born on January 14, 1889, in Moscow in the Russian Empire.

== Career ==
Daykarhanova commenced her career with the Moscow Art Theatre before relocating to New York City in 1929. Alongside Akim Tamiroff and Maria Ouspenskaya, she co-founded a drama school, where she served as the head until her retirement in 1971.

== Productions and roles ==
- "The House of Bernarda Alba"
- "The Emperor's Clothes"
- "The Three Sisters"

== Later years and death ==
Tamara Daykarhanova died at the age of 91 at the Inglemoor Nursing Home in Englewood, New Jersey on August 6, 1980.
