= Yiddish Art Theatre =

Defunct theater company

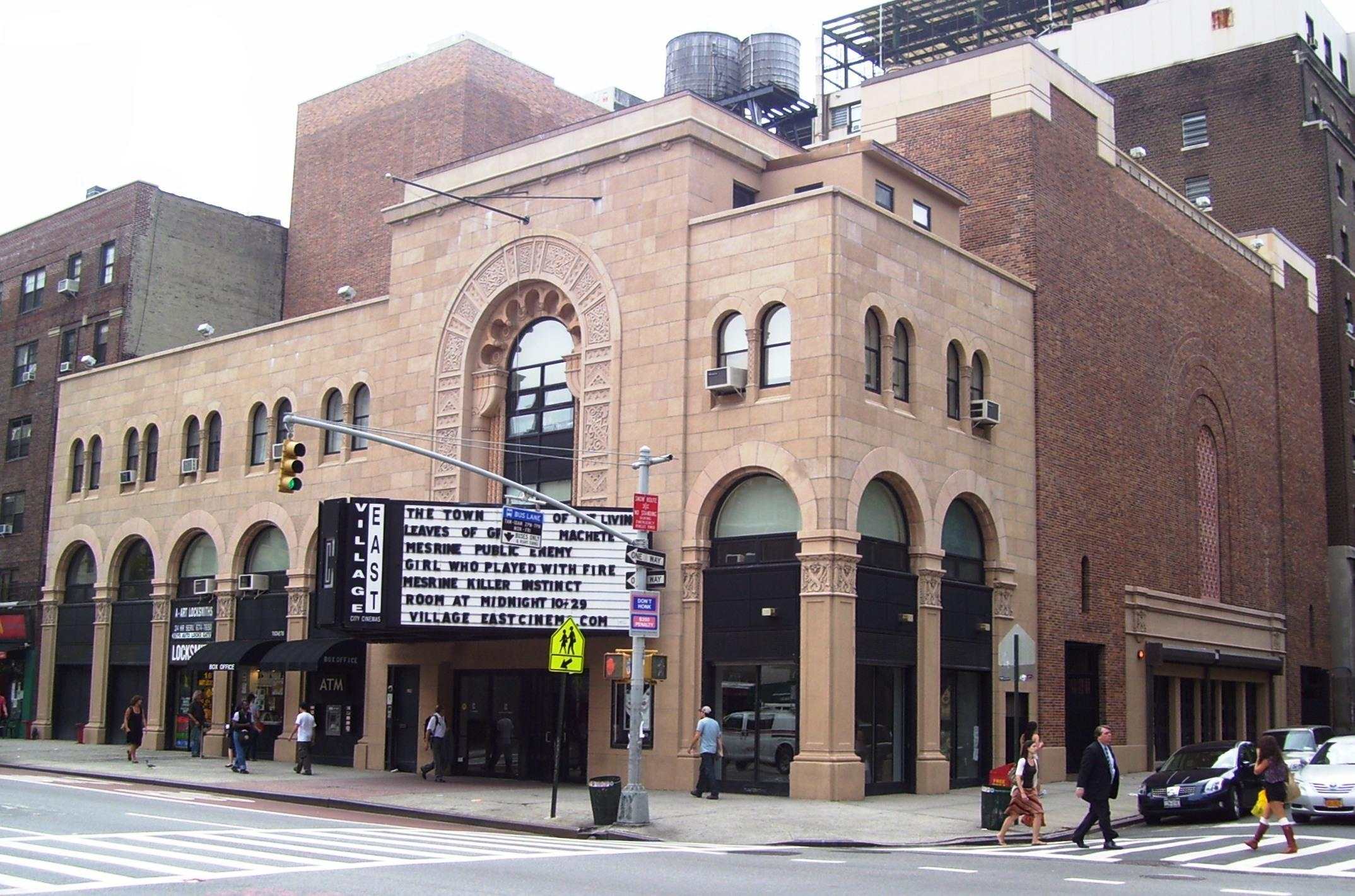
Louis N. Jaffe Theatre, home of the company from 1926

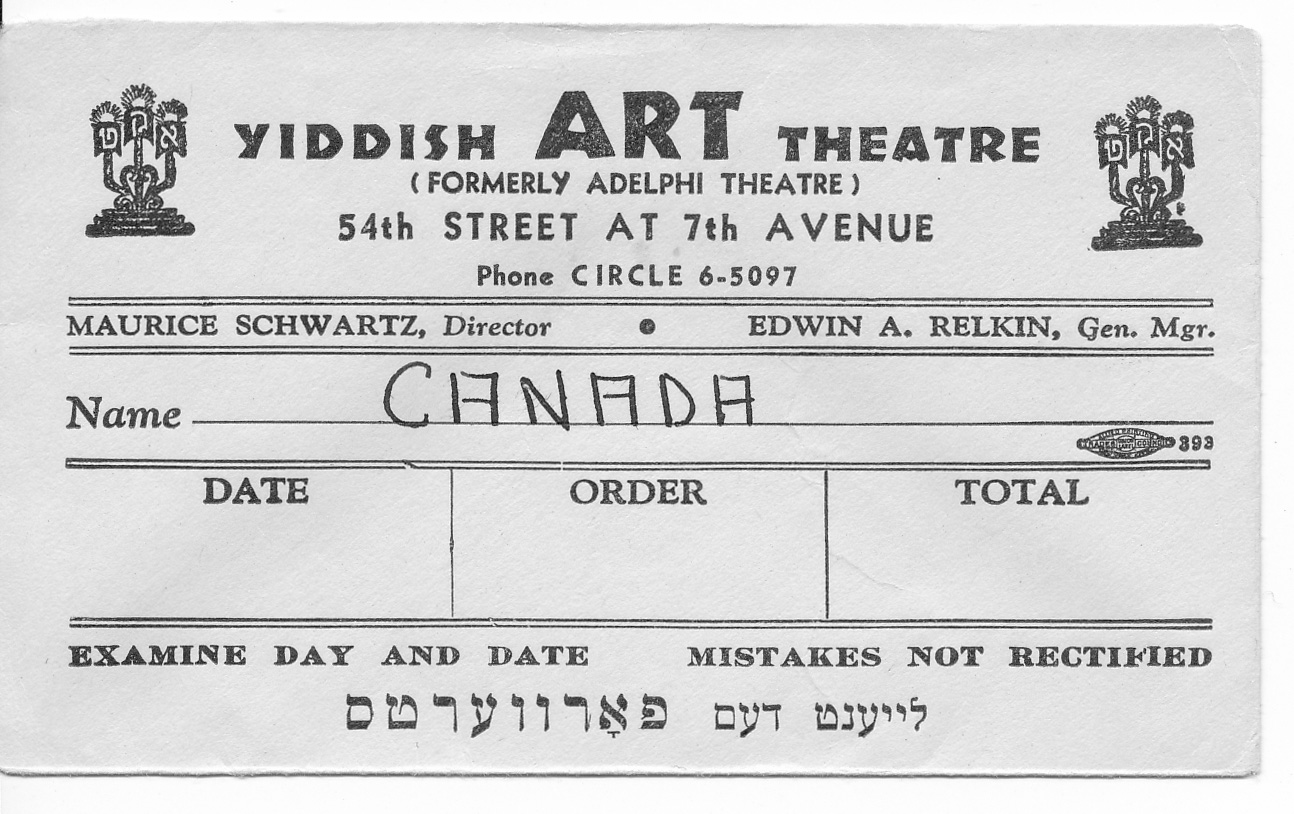
Yiddish Art Theatre ticket stub for Canada

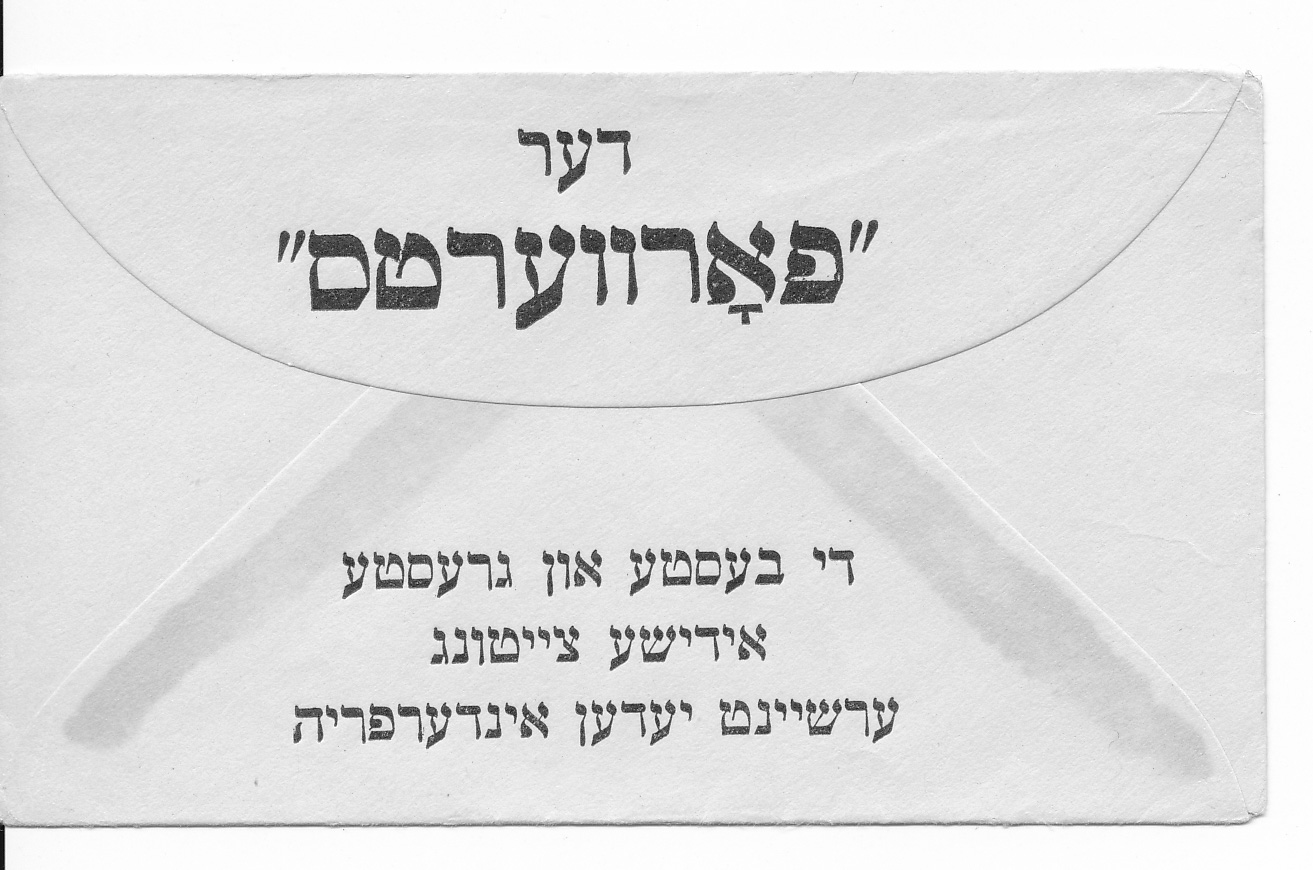
Advertisement on rear of ticket envelope for The Forward

The Yiddish Art Theatre was a 20th-century Yiddish theater company based in New York City. The organization was founded in 1918 by actor and impresario Maurice Schwartz, to present serious Yiddish drama and works from world literature in Yiddish.

== History ==
At its opening on August 30, 1918, Schwartz's company was housed at the Irving Place Theatre in Union Square, Manhattan. It performed there for three theater seasons. For the beginning of the 1921/1922 theater season the company moved to the Garden Theatre at Madison Avenue and 27th Street, where they remained on and off for the next four seasons, through spring 1925. It was at the Garden Theatre that Schwartz first billed the company as the Yiddish Art Theatre. Over these first years the company presented works by playwrights including Leonid Andreyev, S. Ansky, Sholem Aleichem, Jacob Gordin, Maxim Gorky, Peretz Hirschbein, David Pinski, Arthur Schnitzler, George Bernard Shaw and Oscar Wilde.

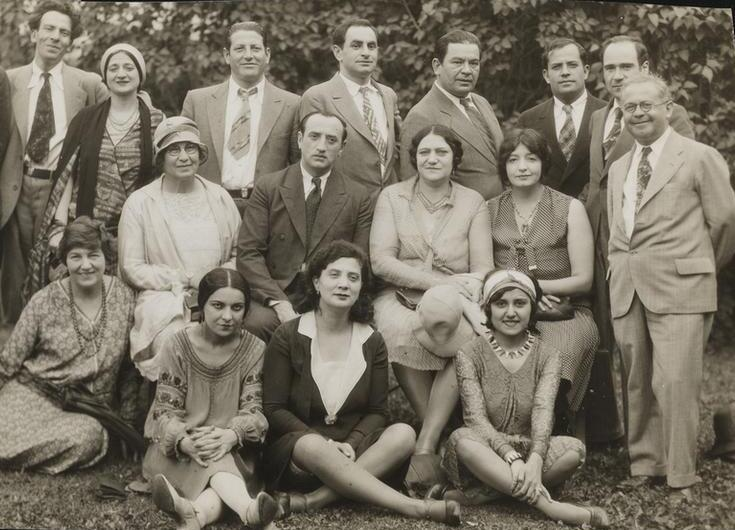
Berta Gersten with the Yiddish Art Theatre's troupe on tour in London in 1935

The Garden Theatre was part of the second Madison Square Garden complex, and in the face of plans to demolish the complex the Yiddish Art Theatre moved to the Nora Bayes Theater on West 44th Street in fall 1925. Their tenancy there was brief, as the next year the Yiddish Art Theatre moved to its own purpose-built theater: the Louis N. Jaffe Theater, a Moorish Revival theater on Second Avenue in the heart of the Yiddish Theatre District which Brooklyn developer and prominent Jewish community leader Louis Jaffe had built in 1925–1926 to house the company. Shows produced by Maurice Schwartz at this new venue included a production of "Yoshe Kalb" which ran for 300 performances.

The Yiddish Art Theatre operated for approximately 32 years from its founding, finally disbanding in 1950. Over that time it performed classics of Yiddish, European and English theater, ranging from works by Sholem Aleichem to William Shakespeare.
