= Iso Szajewicz =

Polish Jewish conductor and composer

Israel "Iso" Szajewicz (1910–1941) was a Polish-Jewish composer and conductor born in Kutno, Poland. His parents, Dineh and Józef Szajewicz, were Yiddish actors, on the road with a wandering Jewish theatre troupe. He was raised by his step-father, the actor Avrom Kurtz. He worked as a hairdresser and taught himself music in his young years.

In 1926 he studied violin and theatre for one year at the Jewish Music Institute in Wilno. In 1927 he moved to Warsaw and began teaching at Mieczysław Karłowicz's school as well as playing violin in theatre orchestras. In 1931 he became music director at the Kaminski Theatre, then studied at the State music conservatory and in 1937 received an award for distinction in direction from Professor Valerian Berdyayev and in composition from Karol Szymanowski. Conducted concerts of the Jewish Music Society. He composed music for theatre and film.

One of his first major works was the music for Noah Pandre (נח פאנדרע) by Zalman Shneur, produced by Zygmunt Turkow at the Nowości Theatre; he followed with music for Di kishef-makher (The sorcerer) by Klara Segałowicz; Soreh-Sheyndl fun Yehupetz directed by Ida Kamińska; Meylekh-freylekh by Yankev Preger, produced by Michał Weichert in 1938 in Łódź, later in Warsaw; revue programs for Shimon Dzigan and Israel Shumacher's revi-teater. He wrote the music for the films Tkies-khaf (The Vow) and On a heym (Homeless) (directed in Warsaw by Alexander Martin from the drama by Jacob Gordin), in which Wiera Gran sang his Aheym, aheym and Beser in troym tsurik.

His greatest artistic success was the musical score to Lope de Vega's Fuenteovejuna, a show produced by Ida Kamińska's theatre company. He also composed the music for Der Tunkeler's musical comedy Got's ganovim (God's thieves) produced by the Vilner Troupe in 1935.

When the rise of anti-Semitism led to a "extermination process of Jewish musicians from their Polish work-places" and when in response a Jewish symphonic orchestra was created in Warsaw, Szajewicz was chosen as its director. Its concerts, held on Saturdays and Sundays between 10 and 12 in the Nowości Theatre, were a great success.

At the outbreak of World War II, Szajewicz fled to Białystok, where he was chosen to lead the symphonic orchestra. He also toured in Minsk. When German-Soviet war broke out in 1941 he wasn’t able to evacuate; he headed back to Warsaw to be with his mother, but somewhere in the woods between Białystok and Baranowicze he died in unknown circumstances.

== Read more ==
- Manger, Turkow, and Perenson: Yidisher teater in Eyrope (pp 99, 101, 119)
- Ariye Martakover: Yorbukh, Tel-Aviv 1967 p. 339
- Yonas Turkow: Farlozhene Shtern (Lost stars), Book one, page 114; Book two pp. 209 and 291
- Zigmunt Turkow: Di ibergerisene Tkifeh p. 209
- Michał Weichert: Zikhroynes, tsveyter band (Varshe), p. 343
- Leon Tadeusz Blaszczyk: Dyrygenci Polscy i obcy w Polsce w XIX and XX wieku (p. 292)

== Filmography ==
- W walce o zdrowie, 1937
- Tkies khaf (The Vow), 1937
- On a Heym (Without a Home) 1939
