= Tkies-kaf =

Tkies-kaf may refer to:

- Der tkies-kaf, a 1907 play by Peretz Hirschbein
- Tkies-kaf (1924 film), a silent film adaptation of the play produced by Leo Forbert
- Tkies-kaf (1937 film), a sound remake of the 1924 film by the same producer
