= Dina Halpern =

Polish-born American actress in the Yiddish theater

Dina Halpern (15 July 1909, Warsaw – 18 February 1989, Chicago) was a Polish-born actress of the Yiddish theater, who came to the United States in 1938, on the eve of the Second World War, and spent the rest of her life there. She first became famous in the 1930s for her roles on the Yiddish stage in Poland, as well as in Yiddish-language films. After the war she performed with great success in Yiddish theaters in the U.S., especially in Chicago, where she made her home; and toured internationally, both as a guest star and a director of Yiddish troupes. Also well known for her recitations, she was highly regarded as an interpreter of classic and contemporary Yiddish poetry. Halpern won the Itzik Manger Prize in 1988.

Halpern was a niece of the renowned Yiddish actress Ester Rachel Kaminska, and a cousin of Kamińska's daughter, the actress Ida Kamińska.

== Filmography ==
- The Vow (1937)
- The Dybbuk (1937)
- I Have Sinned (1936)
