= Leo-Film =

Former Polish film production company

- Industry: Film production
- Founded: 1920s
- Headquarters: Warsaw, Poland
- Key people: Maria Hirszbein, Bolesław Land

Leo-Film was a film production company based in Warsaw, Poland, operating in the 1920s and 1930s. It was one of the most significant film studios among approximately 150 active in the Second Polish Republic during the interwar period.

== History ==
The origins of the studio are linked to the activities of Leon Forbert and Maria Hirszbein, who was employed by him from 1924. Forbert's studio specialized in producing feature and documentary films in Yiddish. Over time, Hirszbein became a co-owner, and in 1926, after buying out Forbert's shares, she became the sole owner. She then renamed the studio Leo-Film, previously known as Leo Forbert, Forbert-Film, and Efes-Film. In 1932, after entering into a partnership with set designer and architect Bolesław Land, Hirszbein lost decisive control over the company's management. A few years later, following Land's death in 1936, she regained control. Leo-Film was one of the most prominent film studios in Poland during the 1930s.

The main directors of Leo-Film's productions were Henryk Szaro and Juliusz Gardan, who began their artistic careers at the studio. The studio also collaborated with Michał Waszyński, Marta Flantz, Aleksander Ford, Zygmunt Turkow, and Bazyli Sikiewicz. The latter made his directorial debut with Tajemnica panny Brinx. Additionally, Leo-Film launched the acting careers of Franciszek Brodniewicz, Tadeusz Fijewski, Helena Grossówna, Tola Mankiewiczówna, and Nora Ney.

In 1932, a major success for the studio was the film drama Legion ulicy, directed by Aleksander Ford. The story of Warsaw's newspaper vendors was named the best film of the year and is still considered a masterpiece of interwar Polish cinema. The film was innovative, as it was the first in Polish cinema to portray marginalized young people forced into early independence and adulthood. It received widespread acclaim from both critics and audiences, winning a readers' poll organized by the pre-war weekly Kino. No fragments of the film have survived to the 21st century.

== Gallery ==
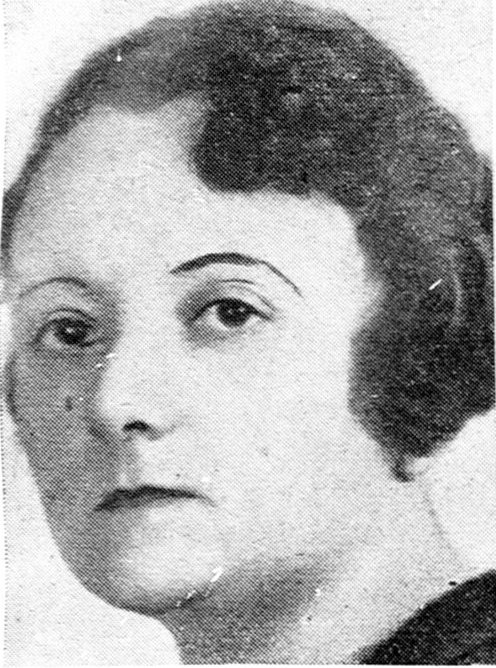
Maria Hirszbein, long-time owner of Leo-Film and one of the first women in Polish film production

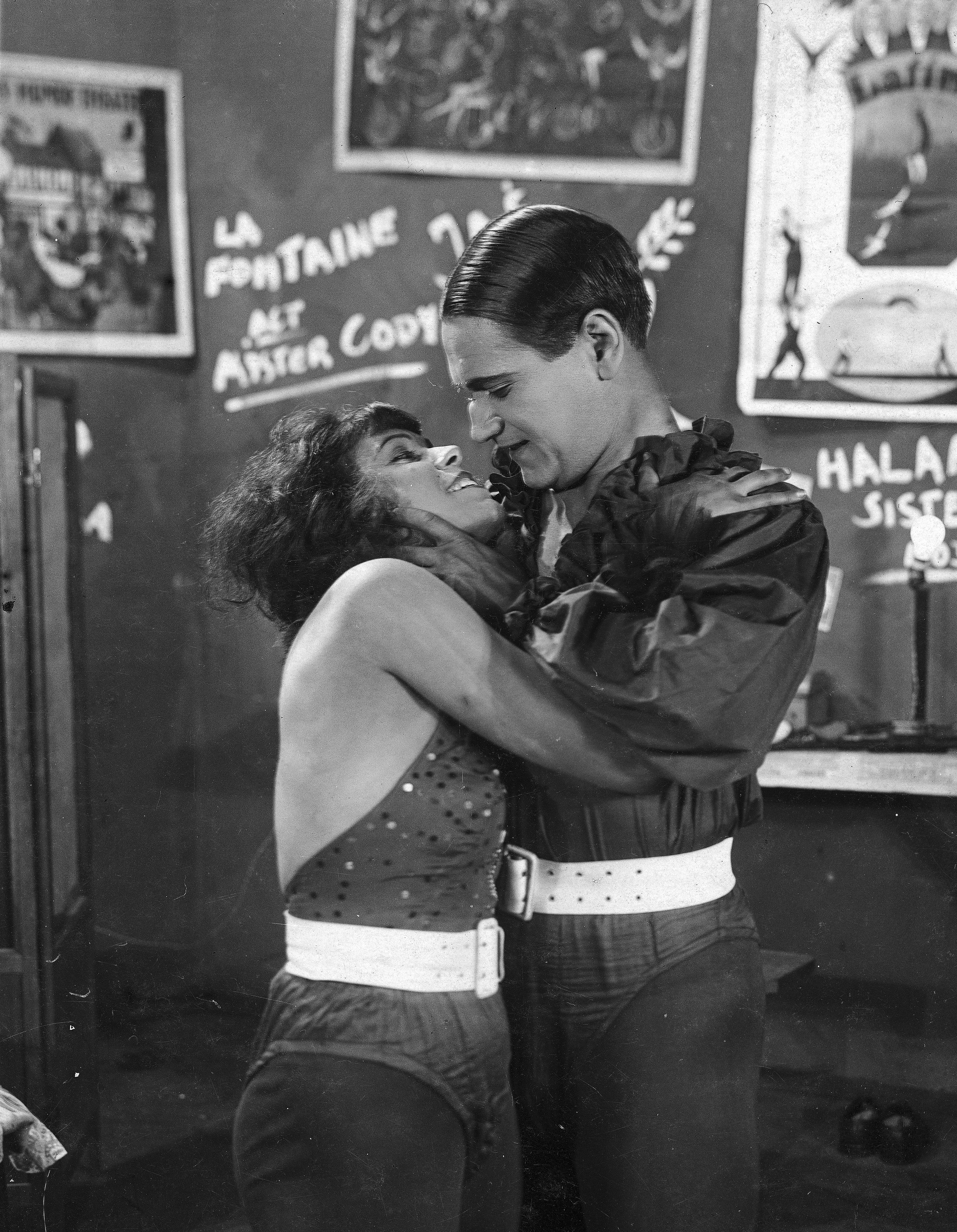
Eugeniusz Bodo and Nora Ney in a scene from Czerwony błazen, the first feature film produced by Leo-Film

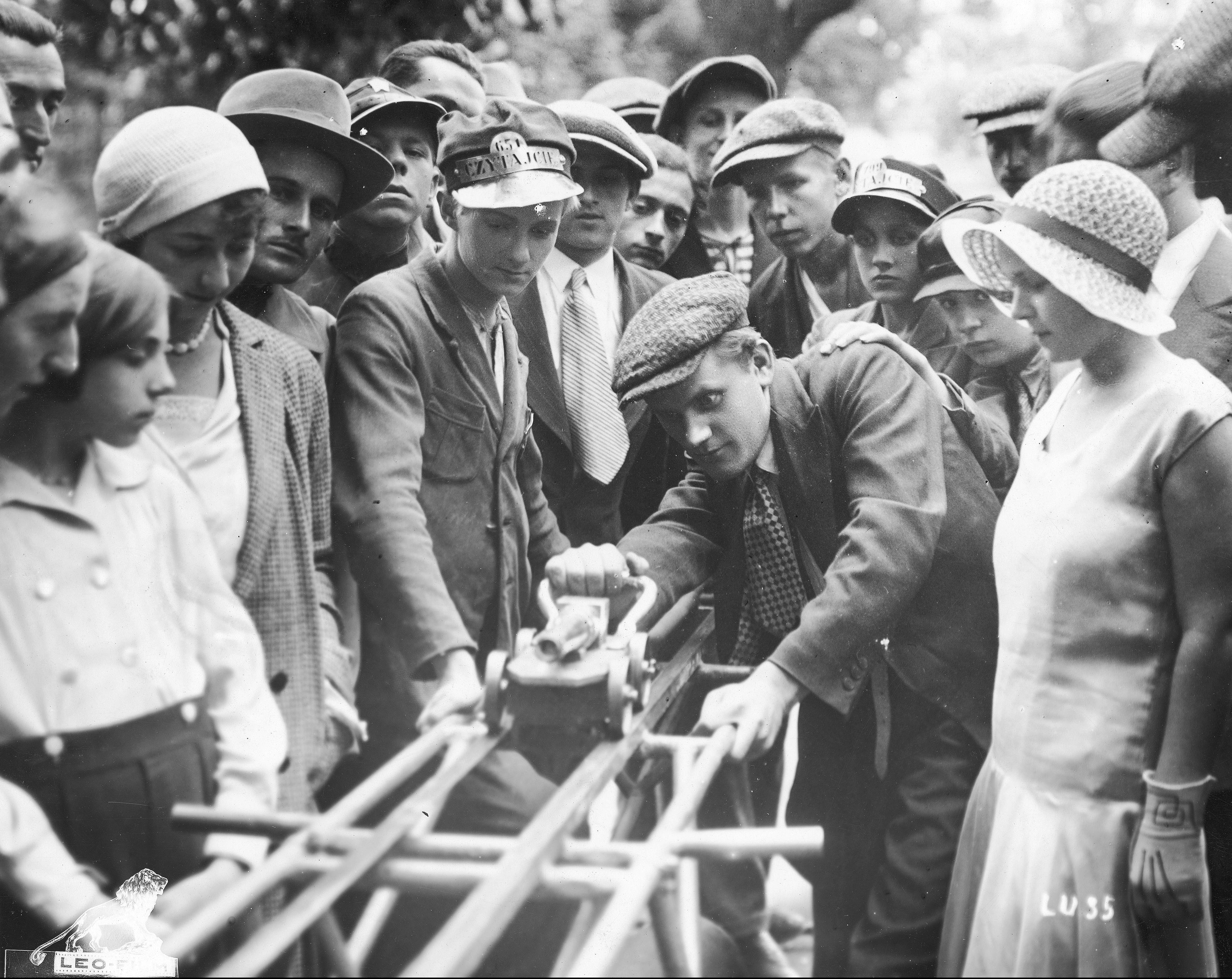
Still from Legion ulicy, recognized as the best film of 1932 in Poland

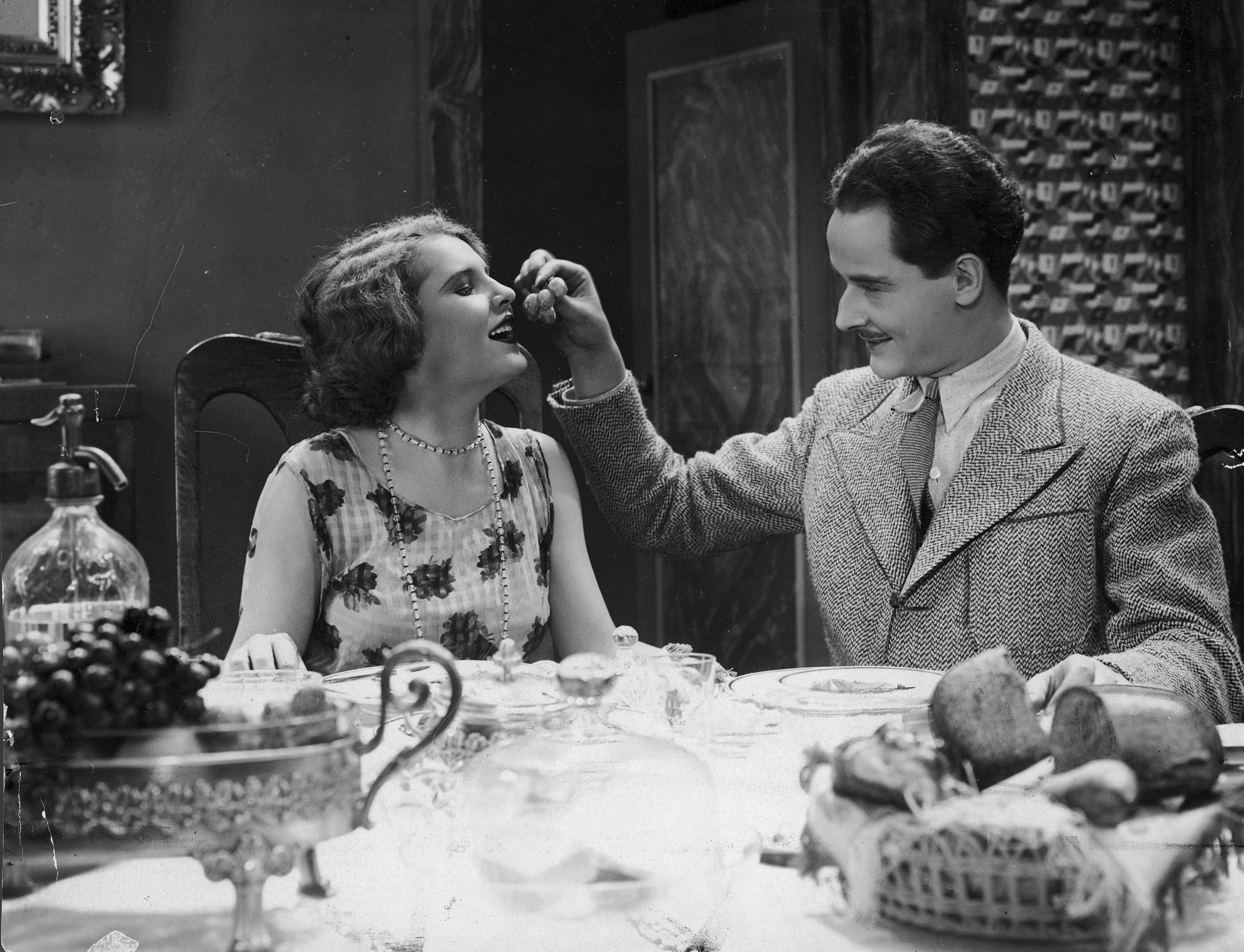
Hanna Rozwadowska as Jadwiga Barczyńska and Zbigniew Sawan as Henryk Barczyński in a scene from Serce na ulicy

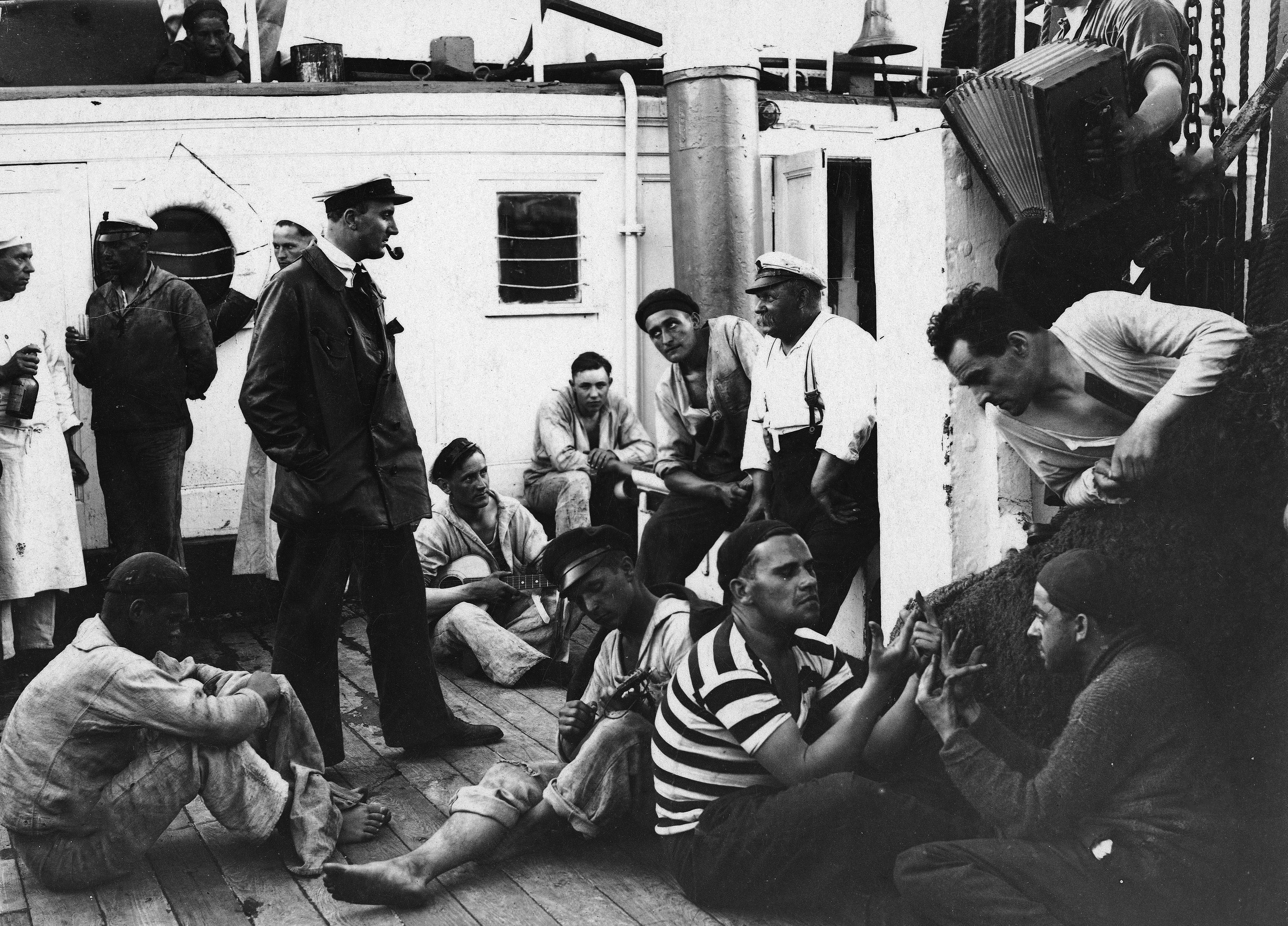
Scene from Zew morza (1927), featuring Stefan Szwarc (standing, with pipe) as Rudolf Minke, Henryk Rzętkowski (in striped shirt) as Smuggler, and Michał Halicz (right, leaning) as Gang member

== Films produced ==
Sources:

- 1925 – Nowa Palestyna i otwarcie Uniwersytetu W Jerozolimie (documentary)
- 1926 – Czerwony błazen
- 1927 – The Call of the Sea
- 1928 – The Final Touch
- 1929 – Police Chief Tagiejew
- 1930 – Uroda życia
- 1931 – Serce na ulicy
- 1932 – Legion ulicy
- 1933 – 10% dla mnie
- 1933 – Prokurator Alicja Horn
- 1933 - Ulica
- 1935 – Kochaj tylko mnie
- 1936 – Tajemnica panny Brinx
- 1936 – Papa się żeni
- 1937 – The Vow
- 1939 – Krystyna's Lie
