= Jewish Theatre, Warsaw =

Coordinates: 52°14′09″N 21°00′08″E

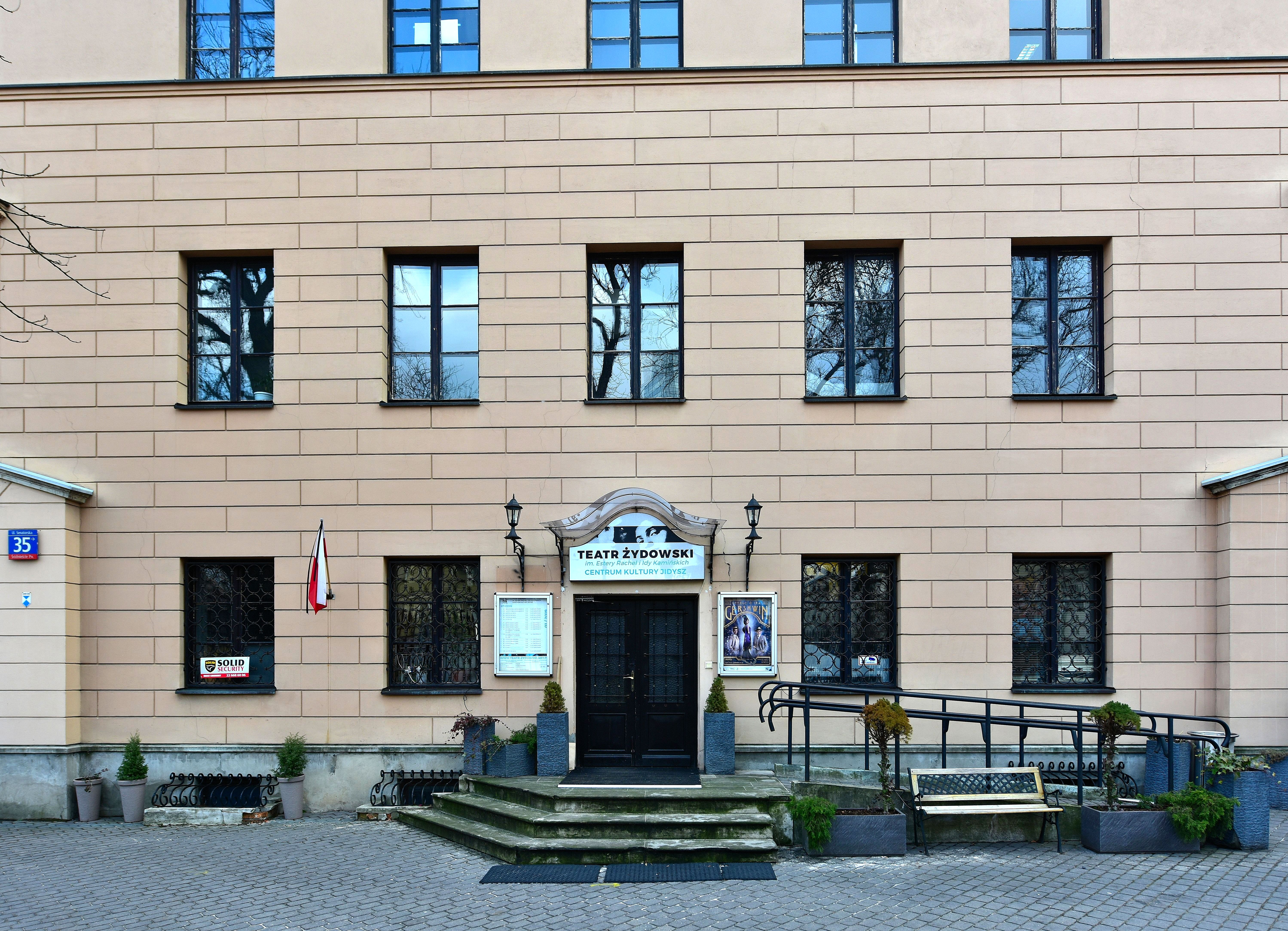
Temporary seat of the Jewish Theatre at 35 Senatorska Street in Warsaw

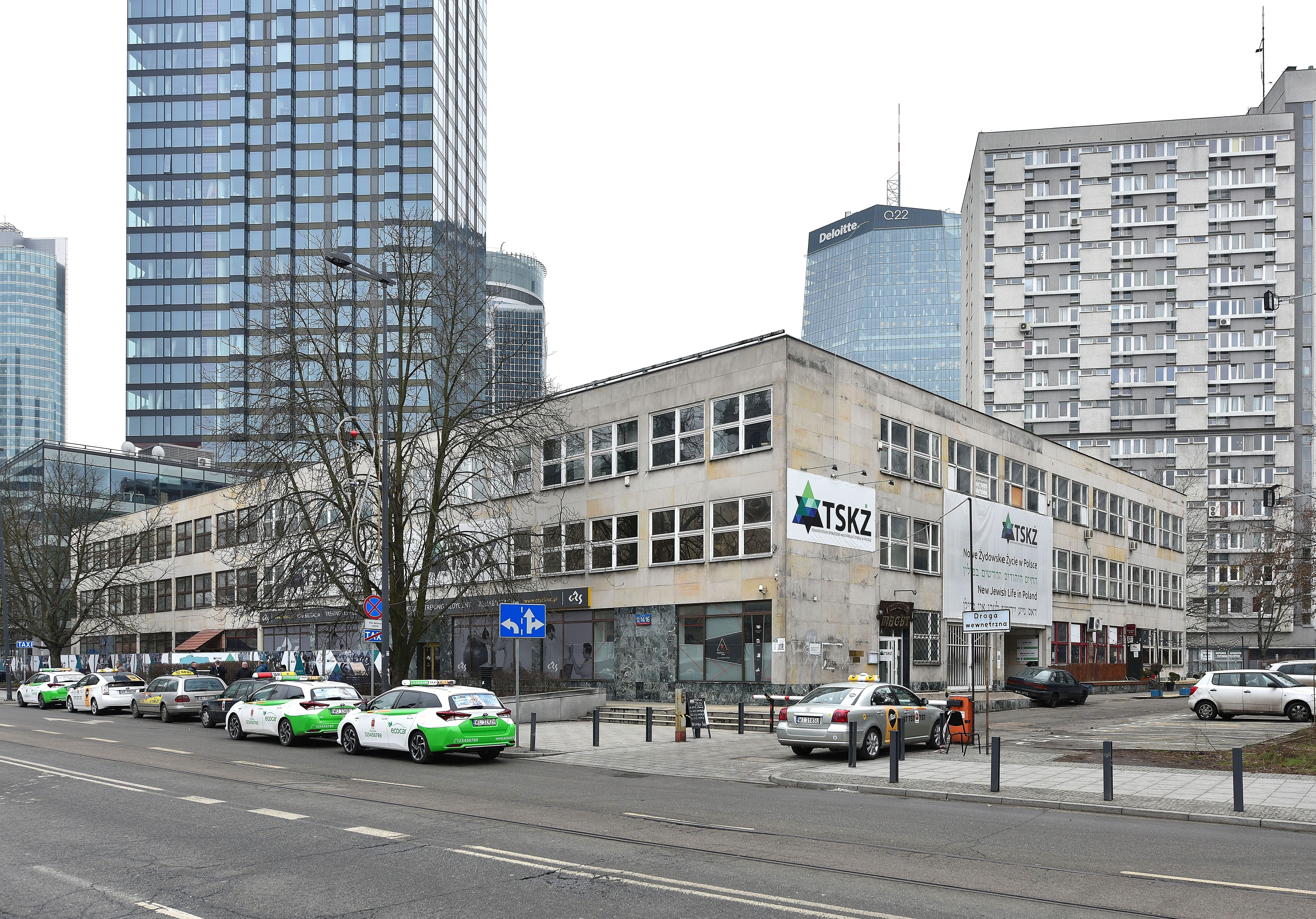
The former Theatre building at plac Grzybowski (Grzybowski Square). The building was demolished in 2017.

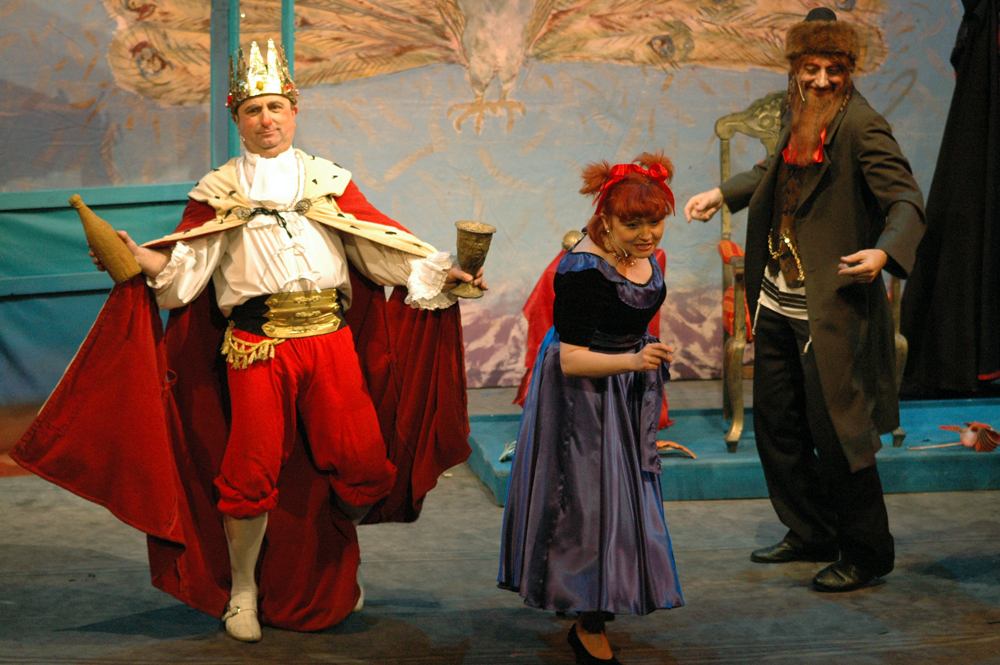
Purim spiel performance in Yiddish, March 2009

The Ester Rachel and Ida Kaminska Jewish Theatre (Polish: Teatr Żydowski im. Estery Racheli i Idy Kamińskich) is a state theatrical institution in Warsaw, Poland. It was named after the Polish-Jewish actress Ester Rachel Kamińska, who was called the "mother of Yiddish theatre," and her daughter, the Academy Award-nominated actress Ida Kamińska. Ida Kamińska directed the theatre and acted in its productions from the time of its founding until 1968.

The State Jewish Theatre was formed in 1950 from two theatre troupes which performed in Wrocław and Łódź in 1945–50. The theatre worked in both cities over the next few years and gave guest performances across Poland. In 1955 it moved to Warsaw permanently. Since 1970 it has performed in its own building on Grzybowski Square.

Since its inception, the theatre has sought to continue the rich traditions of prewar Jewish theatrical stages in Poland. Plays at the theatre are shown in Polish and Yiddish (headphones with Polish translation are available).

The theatre cultivates the creativity of great Jewish drama. Its repertoire features the best works by Abraham Goldfaden, Mendele-Moykher Sforim, Sholom Aleichem, Isaac Leib Peretz and Jacob Gordin.

In 1970–2014, the president of the theatre was the actor Szymon Szurmiej.

== Actors ==
- Rywa Buzgan, Noemi Jungbach, Ida Kamińska, Ruth Kamińska, Estera Kowalska, Alicja Miłoszewska, Ruth Kowalska, Halina Lercher, Danuta Morel, Czesława Rajfer, Zofia Rajfer, Stefania Staszewska, Lena Szurmiej, Etel Szyc, Gołda Tencer.
- Juliusz Berger, Mieczysław Bram, Chewel Buzgan, Seweryn Dalecki, Izaak Dogim, Piotr Erlich, Leon Garbarski, Karol Latowicz, Herman Lercher, Marian Melman, Abraham Morewski, Henryk Rajfer, Jack Recknitz, Józef Retik, Samuel Rettig, Abraham Rozenbaum, Jan Szurmiej, Dawid Obłożyński, Szymon Szurmiej, Michał Szwejlich, Zygmunt Turkow.
