= Julien Bryan =

American photojournalist (1899–1974)

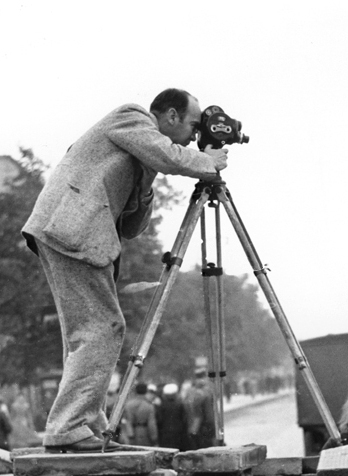
- Julien Bryan in 1939 in Warsaw filming Siege
- Born: Julien Hequembourg Bryan; 23 May 1899; Titusville, Pennsylvania, United States
- Died: 20 October 1974 (aged 75)

Julien Hequembourg Bryan (23 May 1899 in Titusville, Pennsylvania – 20 October 1974) was an American photographer, filmmaker, and documentarian who documented the daily life in Poland, Soviet Union, and Nazi Germany between 1935 and 1939, in the leadup to and early days of the Second World War. He was honored with a Decoration of Honor Meritorious for Polish Culture during his last visit in Poland (1974) for showing the truth about the Invasion of Poland.

His documentary film Siege reported on Poland's defense of its capital against Nazi Germany in September 1939. It is stored and viewable online at the Steven Spielberg Film and Video Archive at the United States Holocaust Memorial Museum in a digitally restored form in HD.

== Before World War II ==
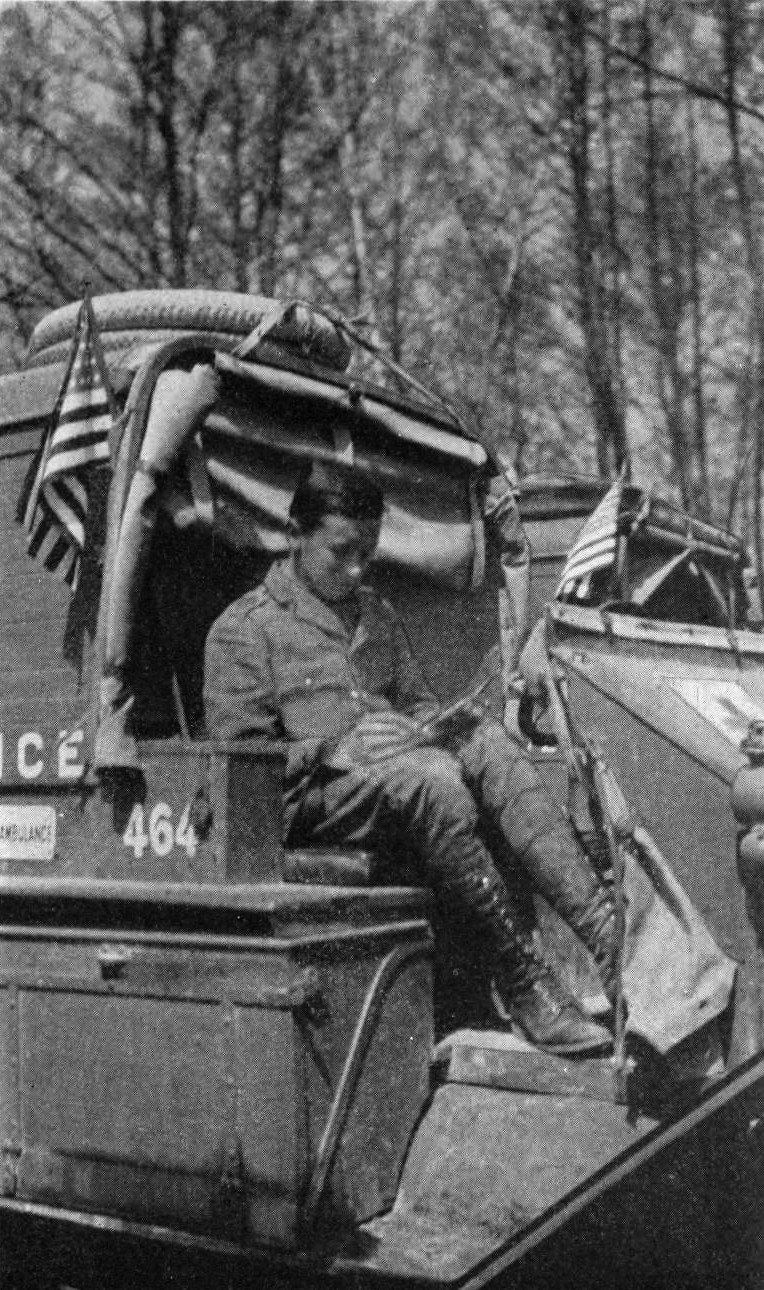
Julien Bryan in 1917 in France writing "Ambulance 464"

Bryan was the son of an elder in the Presbyterian Church with a long missionary tradition. At seventeen after graduating from high school, he volunteered to serve in the American Field Service for the French Army in World War I, driving an ambulance in Verdun and the Argonne, and wrote a book Ambulance 464 about this experience illustrated by his photographs.

He graduated from Princeton University in 1921 and finished Union Theological Seminary, though he chose not to be ordained as a minister. Afterwards he directed YMCA in Brooklyn, NY At this time Bryan started traveling abroad taking photographs, making films and writing travelogues along the way. He funded his travels by giving slideshow lectures about countries he visited and by selling his films to various companies including ERPI. Many of the films from those travels can be found in United States Holocaust Memorial Museum's Steven Spielberg Film and Video Archive. Those human-interest movies chronicle travels through China, Caucasus and Georgia (1933), Soviet Union (1930 and 1935), Poland (1936), Germany (1937), Switzerland and the Netherlands (1939). His films and photographs from Nazi Germany chronicled party rallies, daily life on the streets, anti-Jewish propaganda and Nazi leaders. They were incorporated into two ’’March of Time’’ films. His slide lectures were held in concert halls including Carnegie Hall. Bryan shot over 25,000 feet of film for Inside Nazi Germany, one of the first American anti-Nazi films.

== World War II ==
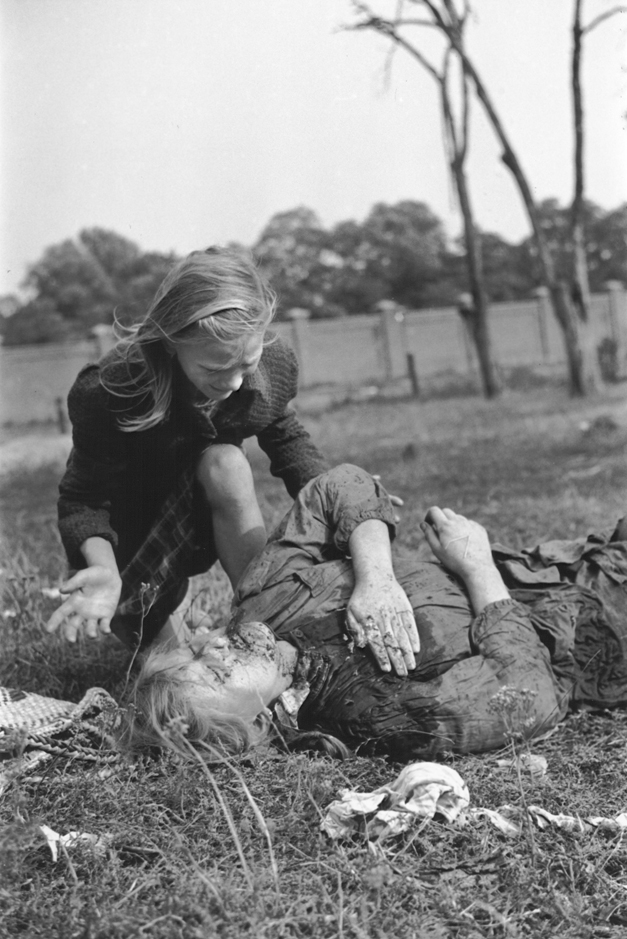
Bryan found Polish girl Kazimiera Kostewicz (12) and her dead sister Anna (14), just shot by a German plane in September 1939

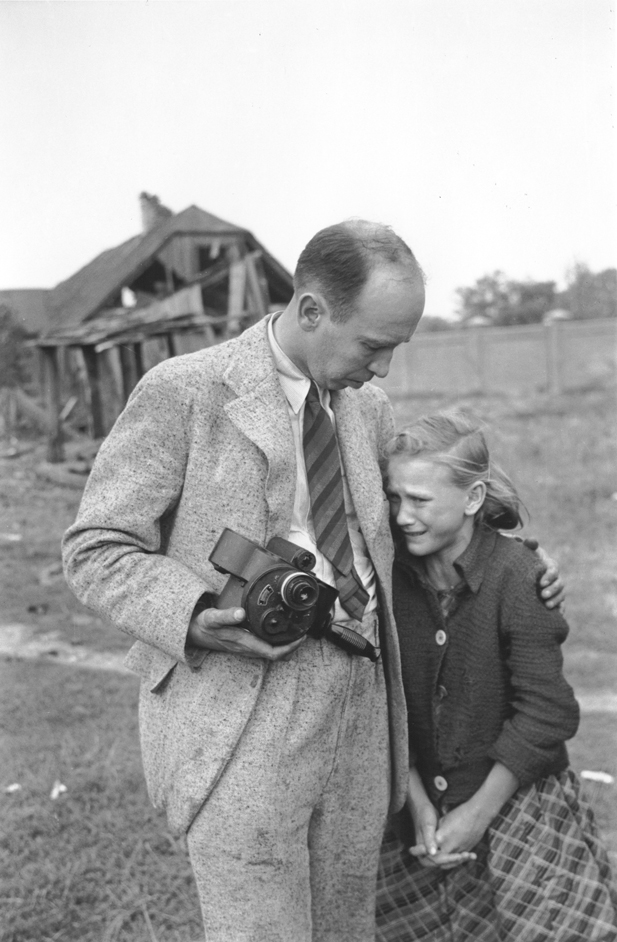
Bryan comforted and cried with the girl after photographing her. They met again 20 years later.

Bryan learned about the German invasion of Poland on September 3 while traveling by train to Warsaw. He arrived in Warsaw on September 7 carrying his Leica still camera, Bell & Howell movie camera and 6000 feet of film, just as all foreigners, diplomats and government officials were fleeing the capital. He contacted mayor of Warsaw Stefan Starzynski who provided him with a car, guide and interpreter Stefan Radlinski and permit to travel and photograph across Warsaw. In two weeks between September 7 and September 21, he managed to take hundreds of still photographs, including color Kodachromes, and 5000 feet of motion picture film documenting the Siege of Warsaw and the bombing of the city by German Luftwaffe. He recalled:

As we drove by a small field at the edge of town we were just a few minutes too late to witness a tragic event, the most incredible of all. Seven women had been digging potatoes in a field. There was no flour in their district, and they were desperate for food. Suddenly two German planes appeared from nowhere and dropped two bombs only two hundred yards away on a small home. Two women in the house were killed. The potato diggers dropped flat upon the ground, hoping to be unnoticed. After the bombers had gone, the women returned to their work. They had to have food. But the Nazi fliers were not satisfied with their work. In a few minutes they came back and swooped down to within two hundred feet of the ground, this time raking the field with machine-gun fire. Two of the seven women were killed. The other five escaped somehow. While I was photographing the bodies, a little ten-year old girl came running up and stood transfixed by one of the dead. The woman was her older sister. The child had never before seen death and couldn't understand why her sister would not speak to her...The child looked at us in bewilderment. I threw my arm about her and held her tightly, trying to comfort her. She cried. So did I and the two Polish officers who were with me...

In 2009, the grown-up girl, Kazimiera Mika, spoke about the event and said she was 12 at the time. They first reunited in 1958, when Bryan returned to Warsaw. (She married and lived to the age of 93).

Bryan is credited as the only foreign journalist in Warsaw at that time. Through Polish Radio he also made an appeal to the American president Franklin Delano Roosevelt to help civilians targeted by enemy bombers. During his stay in Warsaw, he lived in the abandoned Consulate of the United States. He left Warsaw on September 21 after Germans declared a cease-fire to allow citizens of neutral countries to depart by train through East Prussia. In Königsberg, fearing confiscation of his material, he decided to smuggle out his already developed films. He managed to hide some of his films in souvenir gas mask containers collected by a fellow traveler from the US, and by one account he hid some movies by wrapping them around his torso.

After arriving in New York in the fall of 1939, Bryan published some of his photographs. Life magazine printed 15 of his images in the October 23 issue and Look magazine published another 26 in the December 5 issue. Bryan produced in 1940 as a short documentary film Siege, released by RKO Radio Pictures, and wrote a book with the same title. The film was nominated for an Academy Award the following year for Best Short Subject, One-reel. Although the film Siege is only 10 minutes long, Julien Bryan presented Franklin Delano Roosevelt his 80-minute-long film from fighting Warsaw.

In 1940, Bryan was hired by the Office of the Coordinator of Inter-American Affairs (OCIAA) to make a series of 23 educational movies on Latin American culture and customs. Afterwards, State Department hired him to create another five movies about the US.

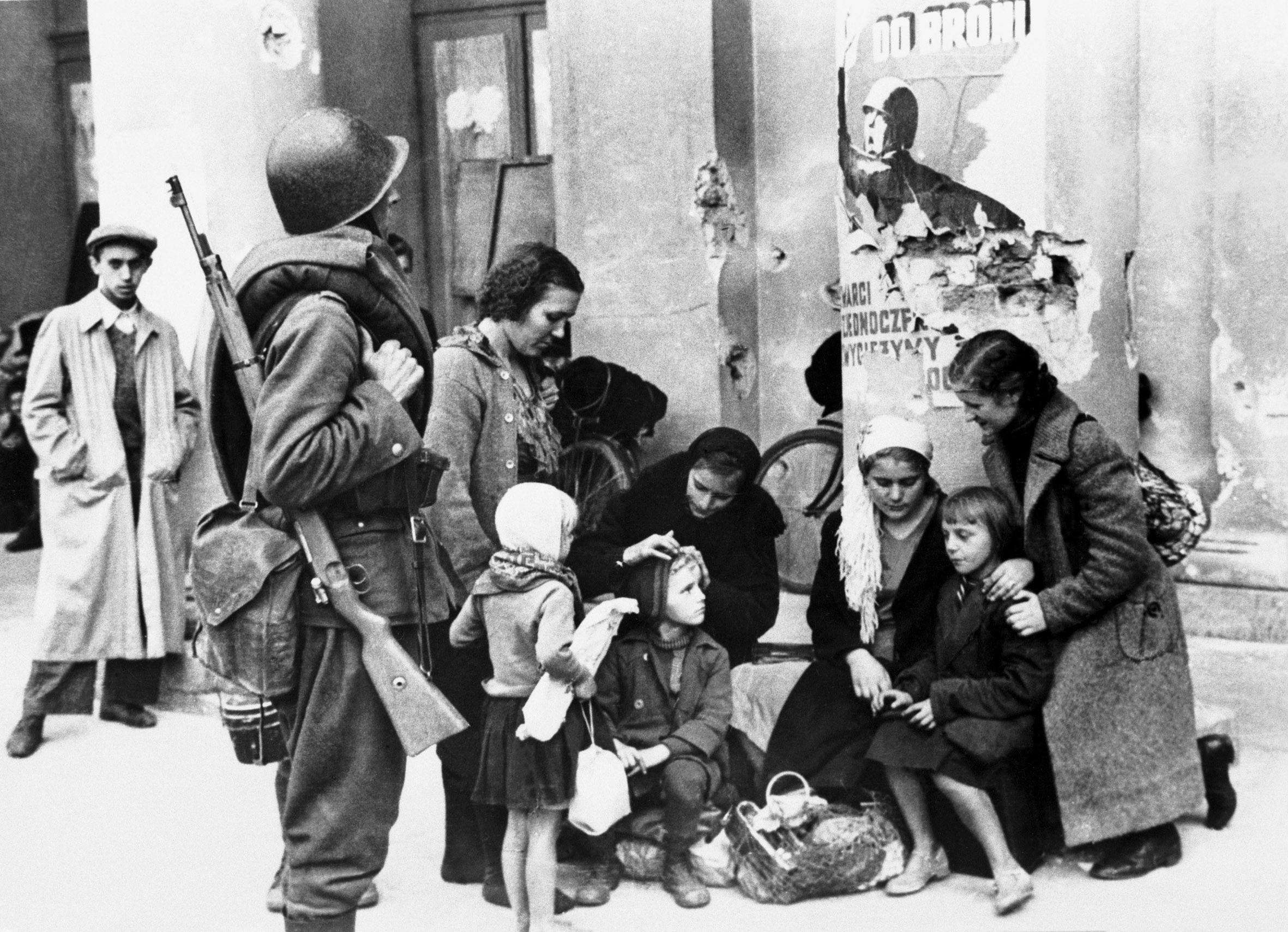
Refugees with a Polish soldier standing in front of the Grand Theatre in Warsaw

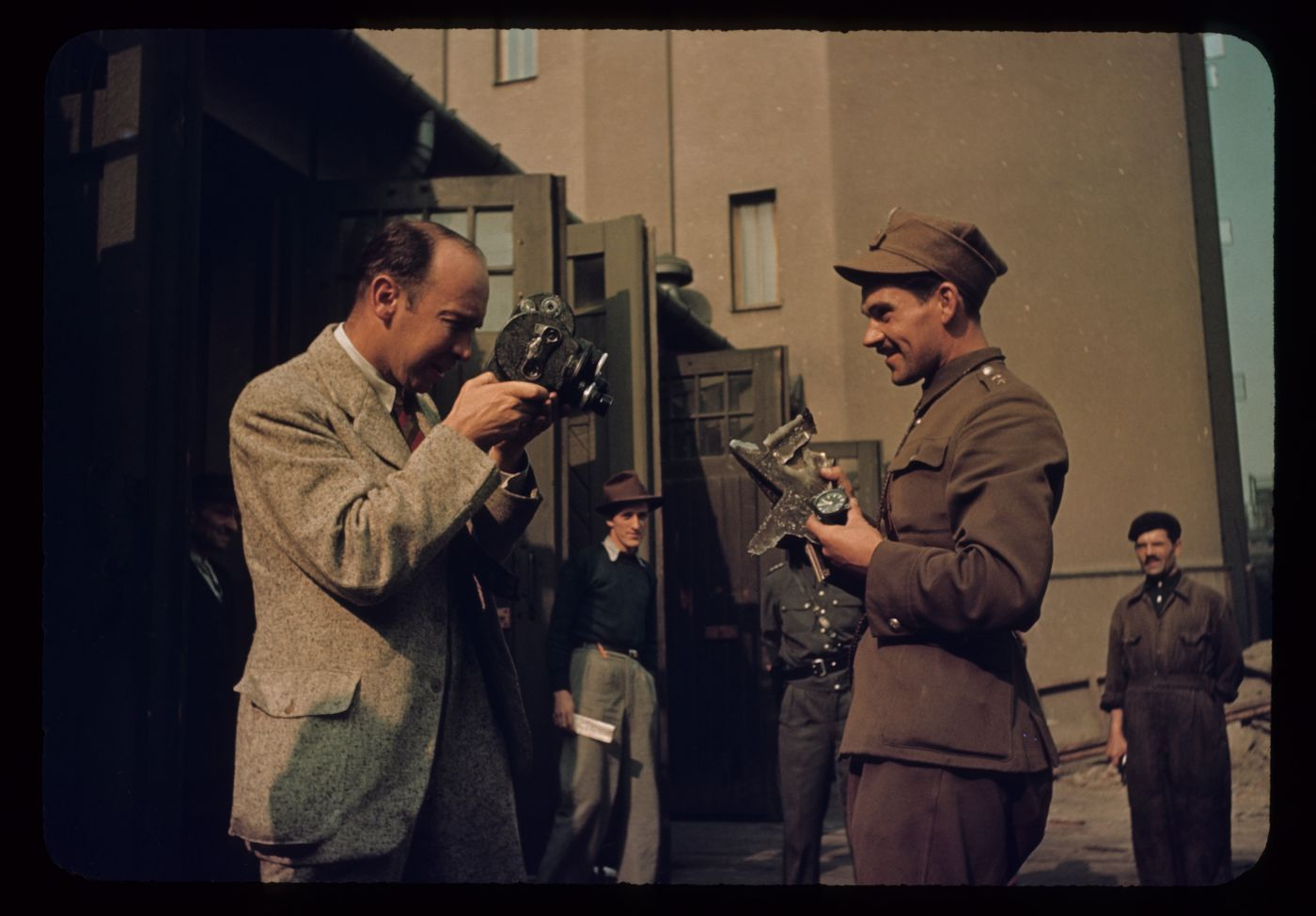
A Polish Army soldier holds the last remaining part of a German Heinkel He 111 bomber shot down by Poles over Warsaw when an aircraft was killing civilians in September 1939 (Kodachrome).

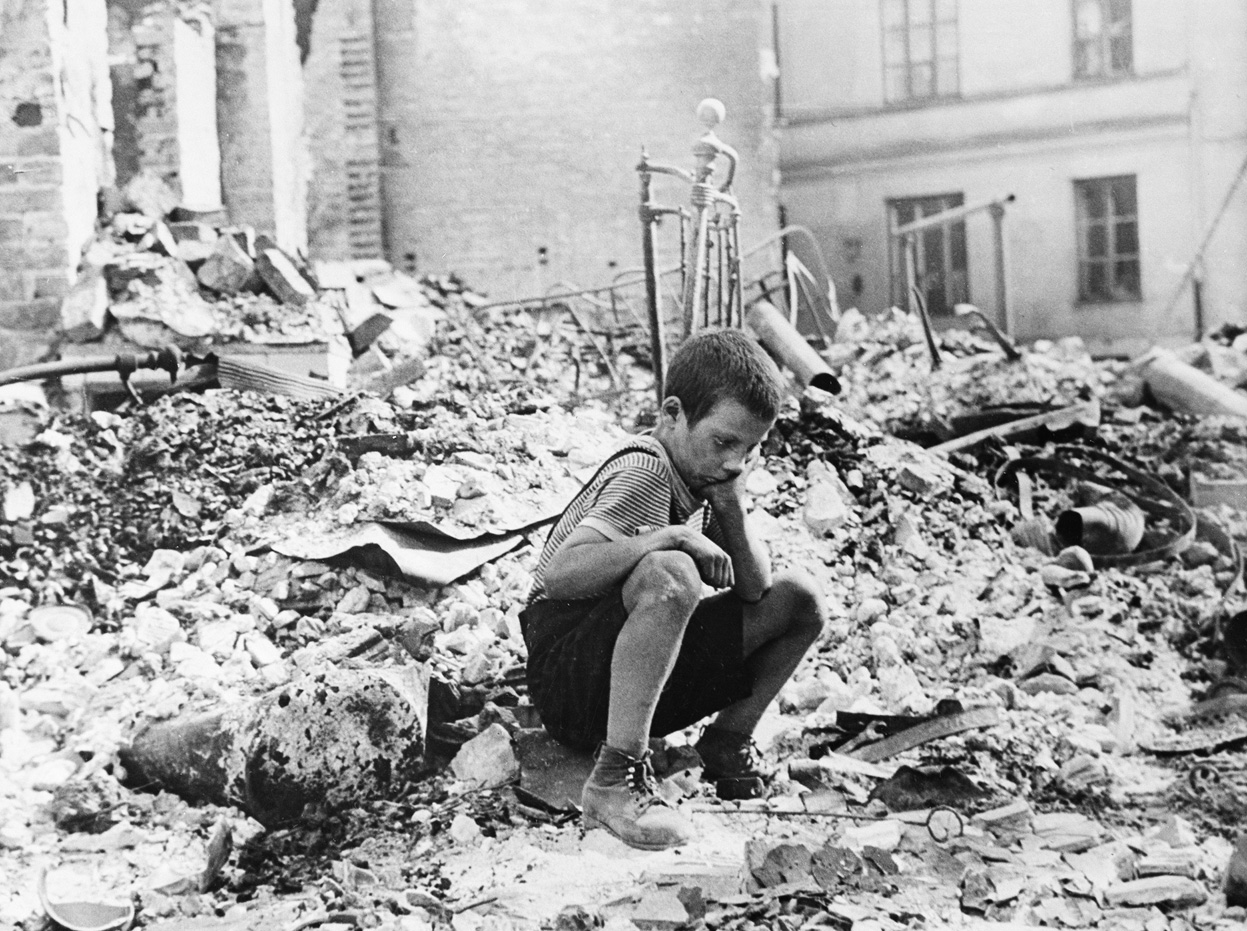
A still from one of Bryan's chronicles of the Siege of Warsaw

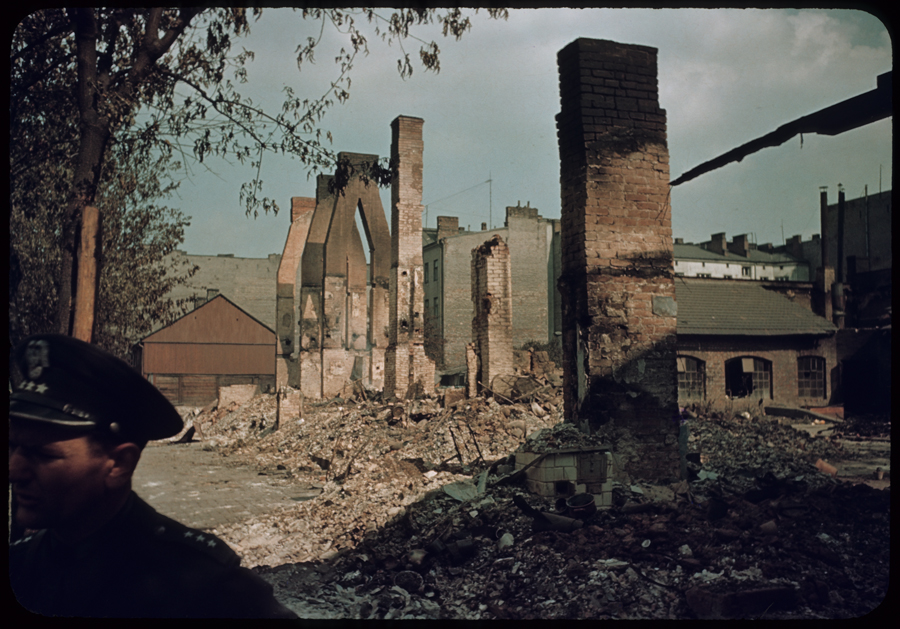
Warsaw after German bombardment

== After World War II ==
Siege by Julien Bryan

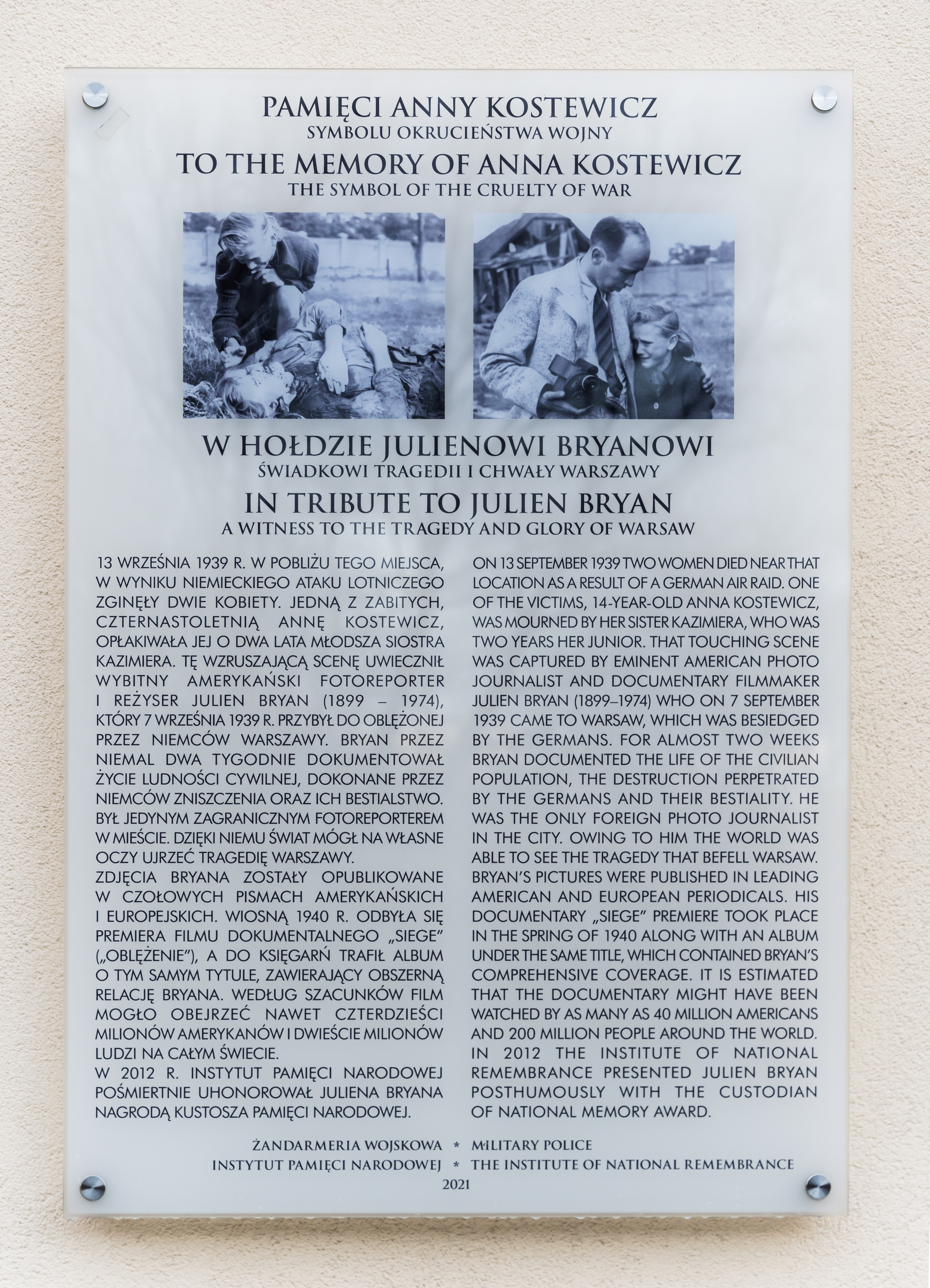
Commemorative plaque at 35 Ostroroga Street in Warsaw

Bryan returned to Poland in 1946. As part of an official UNRRA delegation, he revisited Gdańsk and Warsaw. His Kodachrome footage of recently destroyed Gdańsk is probably the first post-war film shot in that city.

In 1958, Bryan revisited Poland and published one hundred of his 1939 photographs from Warsaw. Working with daily newspaper Express Wieczorny, they launched a big campaign, with a page of the 1939 pictures in each issue, and the words: "Do you recognize yourself, your relatives, your house and street? The Express is helping American photographer Julien Bryan to find the heroes of his film from besieged Warsaw in 1939." Readers who recognized anything in his pictures were asked to come to the newspaper's offices with that information. That way he met and recorded stories of many people in his photographs. He wrote about his experiences in Warsaw: 1939 siege, 1959 Warsaw Revisited published in 1959 in Poland.

In 1945, Bryan started the International Film Foundation (IFF), and for the remainder of his career he made short documentary films for the school market. Son Sam Bryan joined IFF in 1960. Bryan died in 1974, just two months after receiving a medal from the Polish government for his still photography. After his death, IFF was operated by Sam. In 2003, Sam Bryan donated both his father's still and motion picture footage of wartime Europe to the United States Holocaust Memorial Museum. Many of his works are currently held by the Library of Congress and the United States Holocaust Memorial Museum's Steven Spielberg Film and Video Archive. In 2006, Siege was named to the National Film Registry of the US by the Librarian of Congress as "a unique, horrifying record of the dreadful brutality of war". It was also nominated for an Academy Award.

His World War II experiences in Warsaw were fictionalized in the 1978 film ... Gdziekolwiek jesteś Panie Prezydencie (Wherever you may be, Mr. President) by Andrzej Trzos-Rastawiecki. The role of unnamed "American journalist" based on Julien Bryan was portrayed by Jack Recknitz.

Director Eugeniusz Starky assembled Bryan's 1939 footage, including previously unseen archival material, into the documentary film Korespondent Bryan, premiering in Warsaw in 2010.

== Honours ==
In 2022, the President of Poland Andrzej Duda awarded Bryan with Virtus et Fraternitas Medal for his contribution in documenting World War II in Poland.

== Works cited ==
- Waldman, Harry (2008). Nazi Films In America, 1933-1942. McFarland & Company. ISBN 9780786438617.
