= Diana Blumenfeld =

Mid-20th century Polish actor and musician

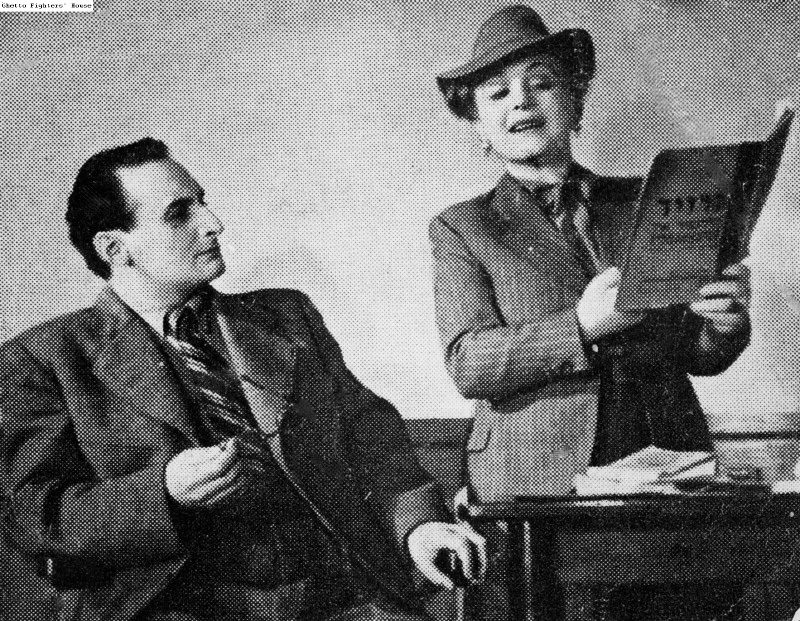
with Jonas Turkow

Diana Blumenfeld (1 April 1903 – 3 August 1961) was a Polish folksinger, pianist, and actress of Jewish origin.

== Early life and education ==
She was born in Warsaw, Poland. In 1921 she studied piano in the conservatory for one year, and then continued her studies at Khrinivietska's Polish Dramatic School, graduating in 1924.

She married Jonas Turkow in 1923.

== Career ==
In 1924 Blumenfeld played with Esther-Rukhl Kaminska's troupe in Wilno. Toward the end of the same year, she performed with a company at Warsaw's Central Theater, and then became one of the first members of the Warsaw Yiddish Art Theater (Varshever Yidisher Kunst-teater; VYKT).

In 1925 she toured with Turkow's company, and in 1926 to 1927, with the Kraków Yiddish Dramatic Theater. In 1929 she starred in the film Di Poylishe velder (The Polish fields). With her beautiful alto voice, and talent as a pianist, Blumenfeld achieved great popularity as a performer, even inspiring some of Warsaw's best songwriters to compose songs for her.

== Internment in the Warsaw Ghetto and escape ==
In 1940 she and her husband were among those confined in the Warsaw ghetto. During this period she continued to sing, performing in cafes, and in the ghetto theater Femina, on Leshno Street. Mordechai Gebirtig sent her his new songs, in the hope that through her performances she could spread them throughout the ghetto.

She and Turkow escaped the liquidation of the ghetto.

== Post World War II ==
After the war the couple attempted to rebuild Polish-Jewish culture. In 1944 she helped organize a concert through the Association of Jewish Writers, Journalists and Actors. She sang on the Polish radio, touring displaced persons' camps, and gave concerts for survivors.

Blumenfeld and her husband left Poland in 1945 and toured Europe; later they also performed in North and South America, and Israel. They settled in the United States in 1947.

== Death ==
Diana Blumenfeld died in The Bronx, New York in 1961.

== Selected recordings ==
- A Brivele Der Mamen (Solomon Smulevitz)
- Fisher Lid (Aliza Greenblatt)
- My Yiddishe Momme (Jack Yellen - Lou Pollack & Jack Yellen)

== Filmography ==
- 1924: Tkies khaf [The Vow; literally: The Handshake]; screenplay by Henryk Bojm, based on a play by Perez Hirschbein
- 1929: In die poylishe velder [In Polish Woods], as Rachel; screenplay by Henryk Bojm, based on a novel by Joseph Opatoshu
