= Austeria =

- Directed by: Jerzy Kawalerowicz
- Written by: Jerzy Kawalerowicz; Tadeusz Konwicki; Julian Stryjkowski
- Starring: Franciszek Pieczka; Wojciech Pszoniak; Jan Szurmiej; Ewa Domanska; Wojciech Standello
- Cinematography: Zygmunt Samosiuk
- Edited by: Wiesława Otocka
- Music by: Leopold Kozłowski
- Release date: March 28, 1983
- Running time: 109 minutes
- Country: Poland
- Language: Polish

Austeria (aka The Inn) is a Polish feature film directed by Jerzy Kawalerowicz, produced by Zespół Filmowy "Kadr" and released in 1983.

Austeria takes place during the opening days of World War I, in the Austro-Hungarian province of Galicia. Tag, played by Franciszek Pieczka, is a Jewish innkeeper whose inn (austeria means inn in the Polish dialect) is located near the border with the Russian Empire. War has broken out and local civilians are fleeing the advancing Russian Army. A number of refugees have taken shelter in Tag's inn for the night. A group of Hasidic Jews from the neighboring village arrive, followed by an Austrian baroness, and a Hungarian hussar, cut off from his army unit.

The film is based on a 1966 novel of the same name by Julian Stryjkowski, who collaborated with Kawalerowicz on the screenplay.

== Cast ==
- Franciszek Pieczka as Tag
- Wojciech Pszoniak as Josele
- Jan Szurmiej as the cantor
- Ewa Domańska as Asia
- Wojciech Standello as the tzaddik
- Liliana Komorowska as Jewdocha
- Szymon Szurmiej as Wilf
- Gołda Tencer as Blanka
- Marek Wilk as Bum Kramer
- Gerard Ojeda as the Hungarian officer
- Zofia Saretok as the baroness
- Stanisław Igar as Apfelgrun
- Feliks Szajnert as Gerson
- Mieczysław Bram as Wohl
- Jan Hencz as Pritsch

== See also ==
- Cinema of Poland
- List of Polish language films
