= The Vow (1937 film) =

1937 film

- Directed by: Henryk Szaro
- Written by: Henryk Bojm; Jecheskiel Mosze Neuman
- Produced by: Leo Forbert
- Starring: Zygmunt Turkow; Kurt Katch; Dina Halpern
- Cinematography: Stanislaw Lipinski
- Music by: Izo Szajewicz
- Production company: Leo-Film
- Release date: 20 August 1937
- Running time: 88 minutes
- Country: Poland
- Language: Yiddish

The Vow (Yiddish: Tkies khaf) is a 1937 Polish drama film directed by Henryk Szaro and starring Zygmunt Turkow, Kurt Katch and Dina Halpern. The film's sets were designed by the art director Stefan Norris and Jacek Rotmil. It is a remake of the 1924 silent film Tkies-kaf.

== Cast ==
- Zygmunt Turkow as Elijah the Prophet
- Kurt Katch as Mendl Feld
- Estera Perlman as Mirel Feld
- Izak Grudberg as Jacob Feld
- Mojzesz Lipman as Chaim Kornblit
- Berta Litwina as Esther Kornblit
- Dina Halpern as Rachel Kornblit
- Samuel Landau as Szmul Webber
- Menasha Oppenheim as David Webber
- Max Bozyk as The Schadchen (Match-Maker)
- Simche Fostel as Webber's Rent Collector

== Bibliography ==
- Goldman, Etic Arthur. Visions, Images, and Dreams: Yiddish Film Past and Present. Ergo Media, 1988.
- Haltof, Marek. Historical Dictionary of Polish Cinema. Rowman & Littlefield Publishers, 2015.
- Skaff, Sheila. The Law of the Looking Glass: Cinema in Poland, 1896-1939. Ohio University Press, 2008.
