= Tkies-kaf (1924 film) =

Polish silent film directed by Zygmunt Turkow

- Polish: Ślubowanie; Yiddish: תקיעת-כף
- Directed by: Zygmunt Turkow
- Written by: Henryk Bojm
- Based on: Der Tkies-kaf, The Dybbuk
- Produced by: Leo Forbert
- Starring: Zygmunt Turkow; Ester Rachel Kamińska; Ida Kamińska
- Cinematography: Seweryn Steinwurcel
- Release date: May 1924
- Running time: 81 minutes
- Country: Poland
- Languages: Polish, Yiddish

Tkies-kaf (Yiddish: תקיעת-כף, 'The Handshake'; Polish: Ślubowanie, 'The Oath') is a partially lost 1924 Polish silent film. Set mainly in Vilna, it revolves around a vow made between two friends—Khaim and Borekh–that their future children shall marry each other. Many years later, the prophet Elijah, disguised as various characters, works to ensure this oath comes to fruition. These efforts are impaired by Borekh's friend Shmuel, who seeks to marry Khaim's daughter and keep Khaim's hidden fortune. The film's production was troubled by an initial lack of director; Leo Forbert's possible first pick, Sidney M. Goldin, was occupied by another project, leading head actor Zygmunt Turkow (playing Elijah) to volunteer to direct the project. Other prominent actors in the film include Turkow's mother-in-law Ester Rachel Kamińska (playing Khaim's widow), and his wife Ida Kamińska (playing Khaim's daughter Rokhl).

Tkies-kaf was released domestically with Polish intertitles, and internationally in Yiddish. It was commercially successful and inspired other Jewish films in Poland, although it provoked negative responses from some Jewish critics. The inclusion of the tomb of the Vilna Gaon in the film sparked outrage from rabbis, who attempted to ban the film. Twelve reels in length, only fragments of the film survive today. An adaptation titled Dem Rebns Koyekh was made by an American team in 1933, adding new scenes and Yiddish audio narration by Joseph Buloff.

== Synopsis ==
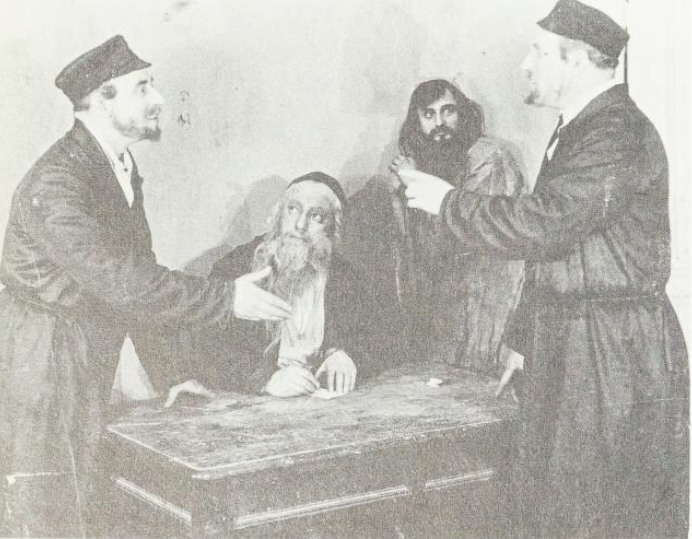
A shot from the film where Khalim Kronenberg (left) and Borekh Mandel (right) pledge that their future children shall marry, overseen by a rabbi and the disguised prophet Elijah (second from right)

The film opens in the late 19th century, as the prophet Elijah (in the form of a Hasidic traveler) (Note: Elijah was a popular character in Yiddish love stories, often appearing as a pauper or gentile peasant and personifying divine justice and the protection of the poor.) visits a rabbinic court in Vilna. He witnesses two friends, Khaim Kronenberg and Borekh Mandel, express their unhappiness that neither of them have yet had children. Through a handshake deal (a Tkies-khaf), they vow that if one of them has a daughter and the other has a son, their children should marry to unite their families.

Many years pass and the two friends lose contact as Borekh moves west to manage his family's forest. Khaim dies soon after learning his son has been killed in battle during the First World War. His widow and his daughter Rokhl are left destitute, unaware of Khaim's secret cache of jewels. Elijah returns in disguise and arranges for Borekh's son Yankev to study in Vilna. There, he stays with his father's friend Shmuel Levine, who has purchased the former home of Rokhl and her mother. Elijah, again in disguise, causes Yankev and Rokhl to meet, and they fall in love. Yankev encounters her and her mother again selling fruit, and purchases their entire supply of apples.

Shmuel discovers Khaim's hidden store of jewels during his morning prayers and resolves to marry Rokhl. He begins spreading rumors of Yankev's behavior to Borekh, stating that he has adopted secular habits. Yankev is tempted to sin by a fellow student (in the form of an evil angel), and witnesses a cabaret show full of showgirls, and later attends a party where he plays blind man's buff with a group of girls and boys. Borekh, angered by the news of his son's behavior, catches him in the middle of a dancing lesson, and attempts to arrange a marriage for him.

Elijah unsuccessfully attempts to stop Borekh from attending a rambunctious engagement ceremony. That night, Borekh dreams of Khaim and witnesses his forest ablaze with the words Tkies-kaf above. Meanwhile, Shmuel arranges to marry Rokhl. She dreams that the dead rise from their graves to attend her wedding to Yankev, who transforms into Shmuel before her eyes. Yankev breaks off his engagement and arrives with his father at Rokhl and Shmuel's wedding, determined to prevent the marriage. There, he marries Rokhl in Shmuel's stead. The prophet Elijah reveals himself and scares Shmuel into returning the jewels to Rokhl's mother.

== Cast ==
- Zygmunt Turkow as Elijah
- Adam Domb as Khaim Kronenberg
- Moyshe Lipman as Borekh Mandel
- Ida Kamińska as Rokhl Kronenberg
- Henryk Tarło as Yankev Mandel
- Ester Rachel Kamińska as Rokhl's mother
- Lev Mogilov as Shmuel Levine

== Production ==
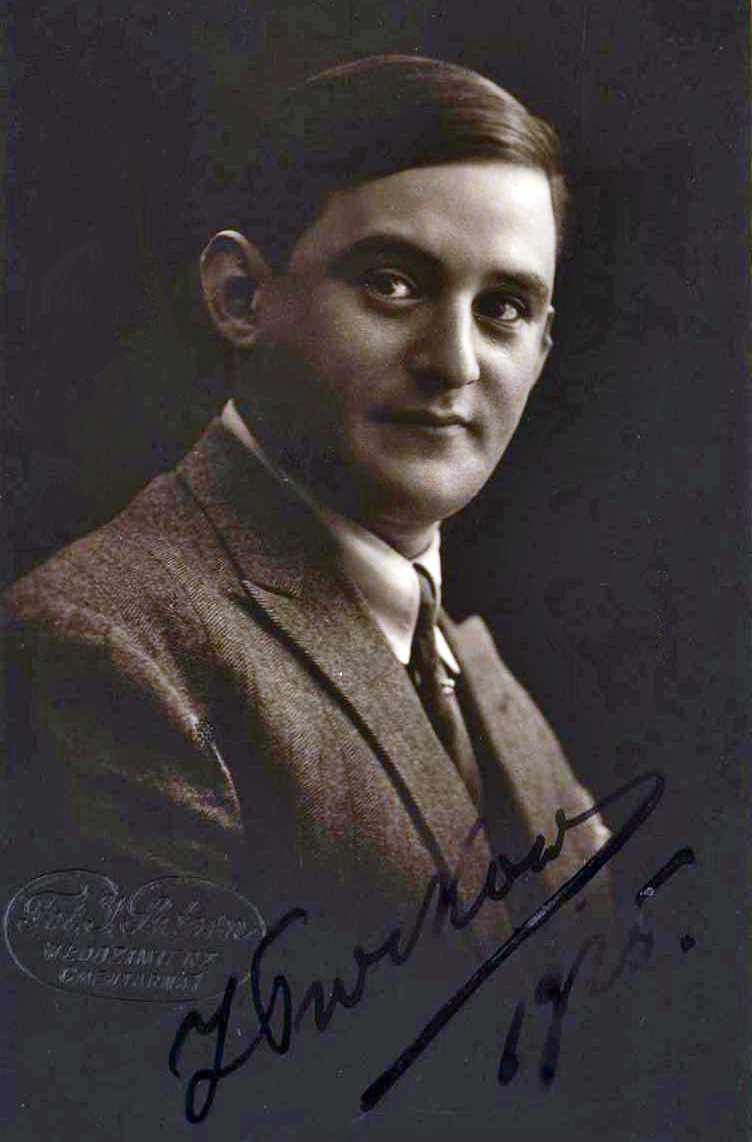
Actor and director Zygmunt Turkow, pictured 1925

Following the First World War and the newfound independence of Poland, Jewish cinema in the nation had been curtailed by sporadic pogroms and antisemitic policies by the new government. Henryk Bojm, a photographer-turned-smuggler during the First World War, began writing screenplays in the years following the war, but was unsuccessful in finding an interested producer. He approached Leo Forbert, the owner of Meteor (Warsaw's largest photography studio), who was enthusiastic at the prospect of Jewish cinema; together they founded a film group dubbed "Leo-Film". Their first production together was Bojm's screenplay Tkies-kaf, based on Peretz Hirschbein's 1907 play Der Tkies-kaf and S. An-sky's 1914 play The Dybbuk. Bojm wrote the screenplay with actors from a prominent local art theater troupe, Varshiver Yidisher Kunst Teater, in mind; notably Zygmunt Turkow, his wife Ester Rachel Kamińska, and their daughter Ida Kamińska.

Forbert had produced two previous films for Meteor — the German-influenced crime films Ludzie mroku and Syn Szatana — both with director Bruno Bredschneider. Neither film made a profit. Bredschneider, a non-Jew unfamiliar with Yiddish and Jewish customs, was considered inappropriate for Tkies-kaf; Forbert may have approached the American Yiddish-language director Sidney M. Goldin, but Goldin was occupied with work on another film, Yizkor. The film entered pre-production without a director; Turkow's cameraman (and cousin) Seweryn Steinwurcel was experienced with the technical elements of production, but was unable to give advice on the acting or movement. Turkow had joined the project on the promise that an experienced foreign director would direct the film; seeing no other option, he volunteered to direct it himself. He was successful at directing the cast, although the acting was often done in the dramatic and exaggerated style typical of stage plays.

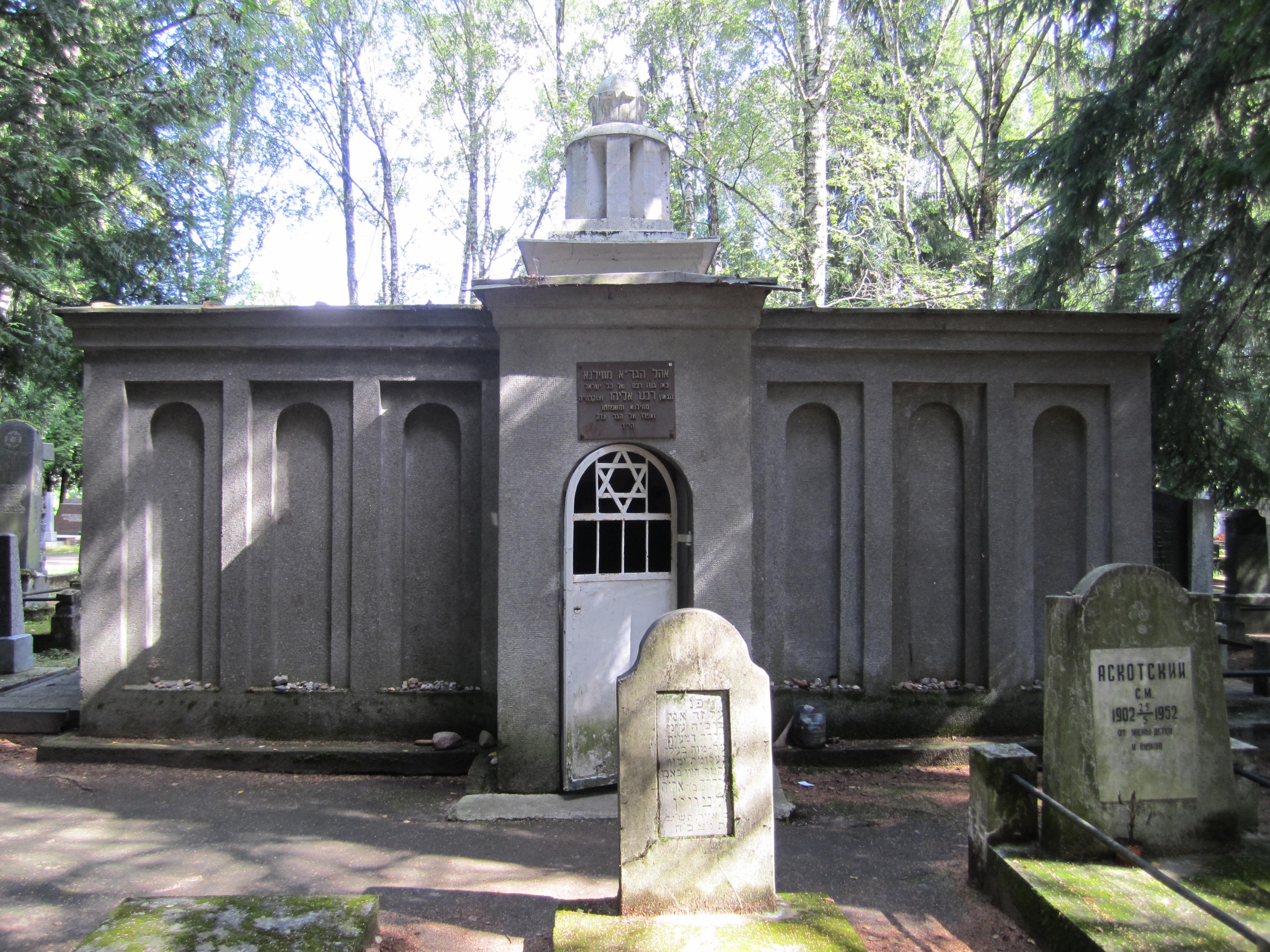
The inclusion of the tomb of the Vilna Gaon angered Polish rabbis, some of whom attempted to ban the film.

The exterior scenes of the film were shot in Vilna and Warsaw, while the interior scenes were shot in Forbert's studio. This studio was small enough to make filming cumbersome, and amplified the effect of the bright film lighting, leading one minor actor to complain that he almost went blind during the production. Turkow recruited beggars in Wilna as extras for the wedding scenes. Scenes set in Wilna often include cultural landmarks, such as the Jewish quarter and the old Jewish cemetery. The inclusion of the tomb of the Vilna Gaon incensed rabbis, who condemned the producers as desecrating the site. Some rabbis worked with the Polish government in an unsuccessful attempt to ban the film.

Bojm wrote the film's intertitles; these were written in Polish for the initial domestic release, but were rewritten in Yiddish for its release in the rest of Europe and the United States. In 1933, an American team made an adaptation of the film titled Dem Rebns Koyekh ('The Rabbi's Power', also titled A Vilna Legend), adding Yiddish audio narration by Joseph Buloff and several new scenes. Spanning twelve reels, Tkies-kaf was among the longest films produced in Poland in several years. Only fragments of it survive today, making it a partially lost film.

== Reception ==
In May 1924, Tkies-kaf debuted at the Rococo cinema in Warsaw. Songwriter and film critic Andrzej Włast, writing in the monthly Ekran i Scena ('Scene and Stage'), praised it for its incorporation of elements from Jewish culture and dubbed it the "best movie that has been made so far in this country". Another reviewer, writer Leo Belmont was more critical, writing in weekly Kinema that the film's creators "unconsciously idealize superstition". A review in the literary weekly Literarishe Bleter, likely written by Peretz Markish, lambasted the film, calling it "garbage" and a "mishmash of real matters and total impossibilities, The Dybbuk and the Prophet Elijah", while also arguing that it would strengthen antisemitic prejudice. The reviewer critiqued slapstick elements such as the ravenous feasting of wedding guests and the humorous depiction of a traditional cheder (Jewish primary school) as supporting gentile stereotypes of Jews, arguing that depictions of Jewish life should aim to be "serious, truthful, artistic films".

The film was a commercial success—Turkow retrospectively described it as the most successful Jewish film of the period—and inspired a series of other Jewish films in Poland over the following years, including Śmierć za życie (1924) and Fobert's next film, Der Lamedvovnik (1925).

== Notes ==
=== Bibliography ===
- Goldman, Eric Arthur (1983). Visions, Images, and Dreams: Yiddish Film Past and Present. UMI Research Press. ISBN 9780835715157.
- Hoberman, J. (2023). "The Dybbuk: The Movie(s)". In Caplan, Debra; Moss, Rachel Merrill (eds.). The Dybbuk Century: The Jewish Play That Possessed the World (PDF). pp. 122–141. doi:10.3998/mpub.1152225 (inactive 1 July 2025). ISBN 9780472076437.
- Hoberman, J. (1995). Bridge of Light: Yiddish Film Between Two Worlds. University Press of New England. ISBN 9781584658702.
- Papp, Susan M.; Polonsky, Antony (2019). "The Politics of Exclusion: The Turbulent History of Hungarian and Polish Film, 1896–1945". Polin: Studies in Polish Jewry. 31. Liverpool University Press: 289–311. doi:10.3828/polin.2019.31.289. ISBN 9781789624564.
