= Gołda Tencer =

Polish actress and singer (born 1949)

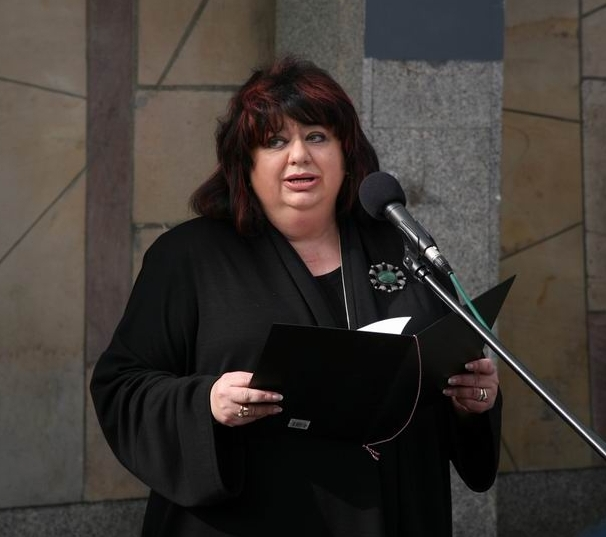
- Gołda Tencer
- Born: 2 August 1949 (age 76); Łódź, Poland
- Occupations: Actress, singer
- Years active: 1979–present
- Spouse: Szymon Szurmiej
- Children: Dawid Szurmiej
- Parent(s): Szmul Tencer; Sonia Tencer
- Awards: For Merits to Culture – Gloria Artis; Knight's Cross Order of Polonia Restituta; Officer's Cross Order of Polonia Restituta; Commander's Cross Order of Polonia Restituta; The Gold Lyre Prize (Israel)

Gołda Tencer (yid. גאָלדע טענצער, born 2 August 1949 in Łódź) is a Polish actress and singer.

Gołda Tencer was born to a Jewish family, the daughter of Szmul and Sonia Tencer. In 1971 she graduated from Actors Studio in Warsaw. In 1984, as a scholar of the United States government, she explored theater life in the U.S.

At present, Tencer is an actress and director of the Jewish Theatre in Warsaw.

== Filmography ==
- 2007: Liebe nach Rezept – as Rosha
- 2004: Alles auf Zucker! – as Golda Zuckermann
- 1985: War and Love
- 1983: The Winds of War
- 1983: Haracz szarego dnia – as Róża
- 1982: Hotel Polan und Seine Geste – as miss Menasze
- 1982: Austeria – as Blanka
- 1979: Komedianci
- 1979: Gwiazdy na dachu
- 1979: Dybuk – as Lea
- 1979: Doktor Murek – as Kapelewicz's daughter
- 1979: David

== Songs ==
- Ballady i romanse
- Bei Mir Bistu Shein
- Cadikim
- Dieta
- Dudele
- Ejli, Ejli
- Fraytik Oyf Der Nakht
- Josl, Josl
- Kinder Jorn
- Mein Jidishe Mame
- Mein Shtetele Belz
- Rebeka
- Rebns Nysn
- Rozinkes mit Mandlen
- Sekrety drzew
- Varnitshkes
- Zemerl
