= ... Gdziekolwiek jesteś panie prezydencie =

Polish historical film

... Gdziekolwiek jesteś Panie Prezydencie is a Polish historical film. It was released in 1978.

== Plot ==
The film chronicles the heroic defense of Warsaw in September 1939 through the eyes of its steadfast mayor, Stefan Starzyński.

== Cast ==
- Tadeusz Łomnicki as Stefan Starzyński
- Jacek Recknitz as Journalist from USA
- Henryk Czyż as Deputy of Stefan Starzyński
- Wanda Elbińska as Secretary of Stefan Starzyński
- Rudolf Gołębiowski as Mieczysław Niedziałkowski
- Józef Konieczny as Deputy of Stefan Starzyński
- Halina Łabonarska as Maid of Stefan Starzyński
- Władysław Kozłowski as Deputy of Stefan Starzyński
- Andrzej Polkowski as Doctor and friend of Stefan Starzyński
- Ryszard Sobolewski as General Rommel
- Tadeusz Bogucki as Marian Kościałkowski
- Aleksander Fabisiak as Officer
