= Jonas Turkow =

Polish-Israeli actor, director, and writer

- Born: 15 February 1898; Warsaw, Poland
- Died: 4 February 1988 (aged 89); Tel Aviv, Israel
- Occupation(s): Actor, filmmaker, writer, manager
- Years active: 1916–1950

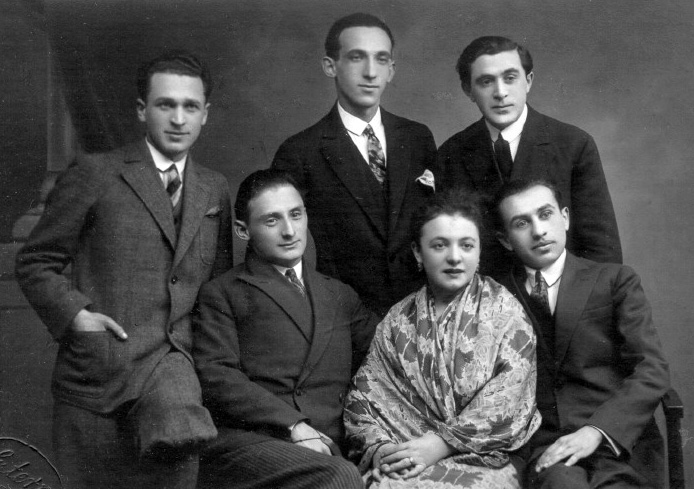
Jonas Turkow second from the left

Jonas Turkow (Warsaw, 15 February 1898 – Tel Aviv, 4 February 1988) was an actor, stage manager, director and writer. He received the Itzik Manger Prize for his contributions to Yiddish letters.

He was the brother of the actor Zygmunt Turkow, the actor and writer Icchak Turkow, and the journalist Marek Turkow; and husband of the famous actress Diana Blumenfeld.

== Biography ==
In Warsaw, he performed in Dos artistishe vinkele (The artistic corner), which he organized with his brother Zygmunt, in 1916; and worked for a while under the direction of David Herman at the Elysium Theater. He also briefly performed in the German comedy theater of the brothers Herrnfeld, in Berlin. From 1917 to 1920 he played in Esther-Rukhl Kaminska's troupe; in 1921 he organized Dos baveglekhe dramatishe teater touring Poland and Galicia. Subsequently, he toured with Di yunge bine (The young stage). In 1926 he was hired to direct the cultural Yiddish theatre in Kraków. He received the first state subsidy given in Poland to any Yiddish theater. During the 1930s he was director for kleynkunst revi-teater in Kaunas.

He was imprisoned in the Warsaw Ghetto during the years 1940 to 1943, and after the ghetto uprising survived in hiding. After the war, as a member of the Central Jewish Committee of Poland, he investigated 18 cases of Jewish collaboration with German Gestapo.

In 1947 he emigrated to the United States and settled in New York City. There, beginning in 1958, he worked as the theater archivist at the YIVO Institute for Jewish Research. He moved to Israel in 1966. He died in Tel Aviv in 1988.

== Film career ==
Jonas Turkow performed in the following movies as an actor:

- Tkies khaf (1924)
- Lamedvovnik (1925)
- Huragan (1928)
- Młody Las (1934)

He also directed the silent film In die poylishe velder (In the Polish Woods; 1929), based on the novel of the same title by Joseph Opatoshu.

== Writings ==
=== In Yiddish ===
- Azoy iz es geven: khurbn Varshe [This Is How It Was: Destruction of Warsaw], Buenos Aires: Association of Polish Jews in Argentina, 1948
- In kamf farn Lebn [Fighting for Life], Buenos Aires: Association of Polish Jews in Argentina, 1949
- Farloshene shtern [Extinguished Stars] (2 vols.), Buenos Aires: Association of Polish Jews in Argentina, 1953
- Nokh der befrayung – zikhroynes [After the Liberation: Memoirs], Buenos Aires: Association of Polish Jews in Argentina, 1959
- "Teater un konsertn in die getos un konstentratsye lagern" [Theater and concerts in the ghettos and concentration camps] (pp. 437-515), in: Itzik Manger, Jonas Turkow and Moses Perenson (eds.), Yidisher teater in Eyrope tvsishn beyde velt-milkhomes [Yiddish Theater in Europe Between the Two World Wars], New York: American Jewish Congress, 1968

=== In translation ===
- El levantamiento del ghetto de Varsovia [The Warsaw Ghetto Uprising], translated into Spanish by Abraham Platkin, Buenos Aires: South American Executive of the World Jewish Congress, 1968
- O levante do gueto de Varsovia [The Warsaw Ghetto Uprising], translated into Portuguese by Ayala Ehrlich, São Paulo: Federação Israelita do Estado de São Paulo, 1975
- C'était ainsi: 1939-1943, la vie dans le ghetto de Varsovie [This Is How It Was: 1939-1943, Life in the Warsaw Ghetto], translation of Azoy iz geven into French by Maurice Pfeffer, Paris: Austral, 1995
