= Siege (1940 film) =

- Directed by: Julien Bryan
- Narrated by: Julien Bryan
- Cinematography: Julien Bryan
- Distributed by: RKO Radio Pictures
- Release date: 1940
- Running time: 10 minutes
- Country: United States
- Language: English

Siege by Julien Bryan

Siege is a 1940 documentary short about the Siege of Warsaw by the Wehrmacht at the start of World War II. It was shot by Julien Bryan, a Pennsylvanian photographer and cameraman who later established the International Film Foundation.

Siege was nominated for an Oscar for Best One-reel Short at the 13th Academy Awards in 1941, and in 2006, it was selected for preservation in the National Film Registry by the Librarian of Congress as "a unique, horrifying record of the dreadful brutality of war".
