= Porazava =

Porazava Поразава (Belarusian) Порозово (Russian)
- Urban-type settlement
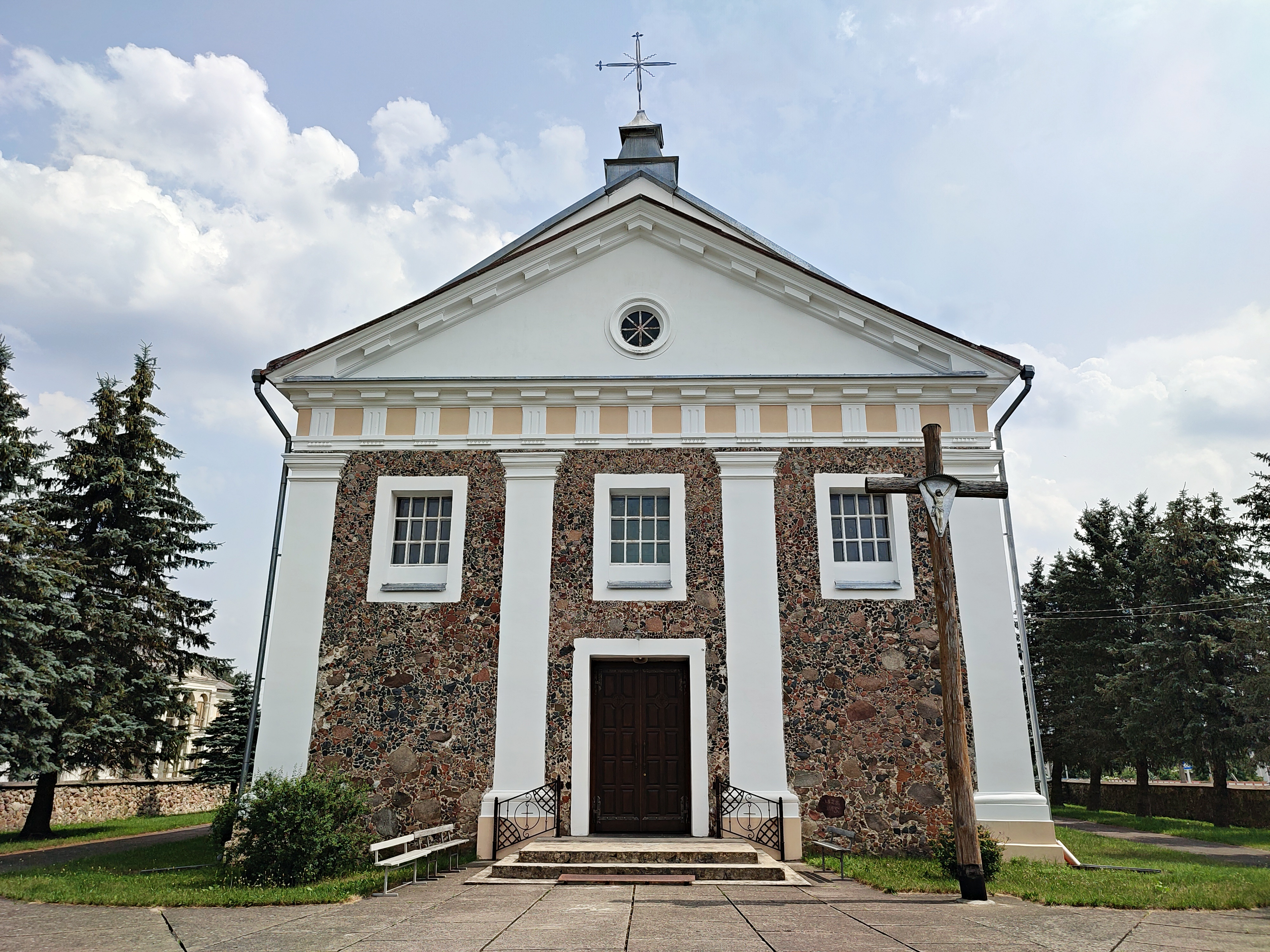
- Church of Saint Michael the Archangel

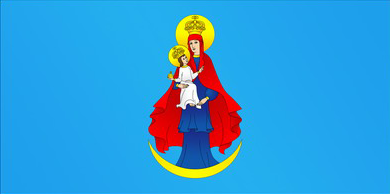
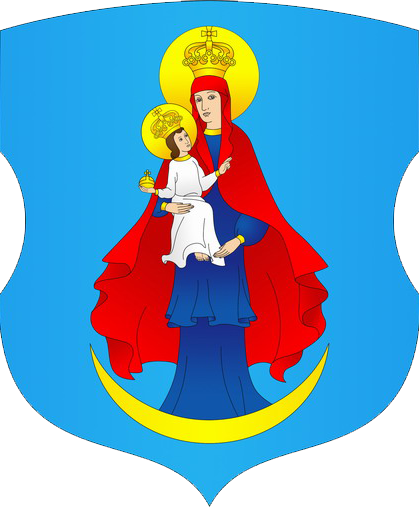
- Flag Coat of arms

- Location within Belarus
- Coordinates: 52°56′N 24°22′E
- Country: Belarus
- Region: Grodno Region
- District: Svislach District

Population (2025)
  - Total: 616
- Time zone: UTC+3 (MSK)

Porazava (Note: Belarusian: По́разава; Russian: По́розово, romanized: Porozovo; Polish: Porozów; Yiddish: פּאָרזעווע, romanized: Porzeve; Lithuanian: Porozovas.) is an urban-type settlement in Svislach District, Grodno Region, in western Belarus. It is located near the town of Svislach. As of 2025, it has a population of 616.

== History ==
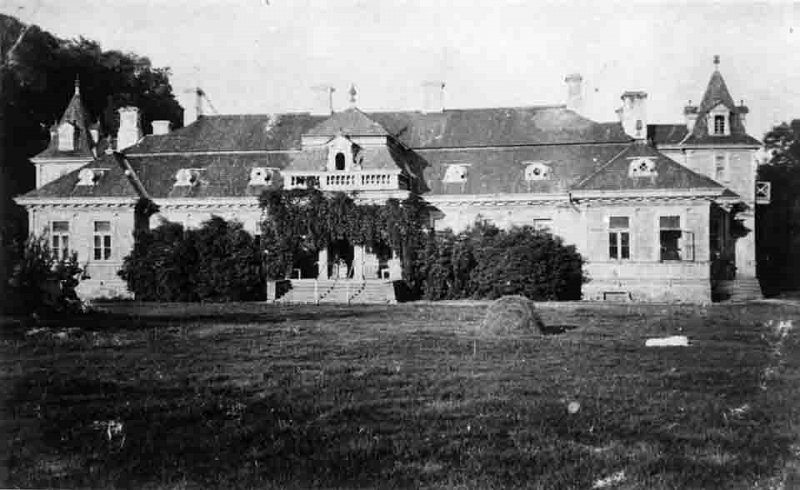
Buttowt-Andrzeykowicz Manor in the interwar period

The first church was built in 1460 by Jan Rynwid. It was a royal town of the Polish–Lithuanian Commonwealth, administratively located in the Nowogródek Voivodeship.

In the late 19th century, the Christian population was mostly employed in pottery, whereas the Jews mostly lived off trade. In the interwar period it was administratively located in the Wołkowysk County in the Białystok Voivodeship of the Republic of Poland. According to the 1921 census, the population was 84.8% Polish and 14.9% Jewish. The town had a thriving Jewish community and synagogue prior to World War II.

During World War II, Porozów was occupied by the Soviet Union from September 1939 to June 1941, and then by Nazi Germany until 15 July 1944 and administered as a part of Bezirk Bialystok.

== Demographics ==
In 2024, it had a population of 653.

Distribution of the population by ethnicity according to the 2009 census:

	percent
Belarusians	51.47%
Poles	44.59%
Russians	2.95%
Ukrainians	0.71%

== Notable people ==
- Ester Rachel Kamińska (1870–1925), actress
