= Wiera Gran =

Polish singer and actress

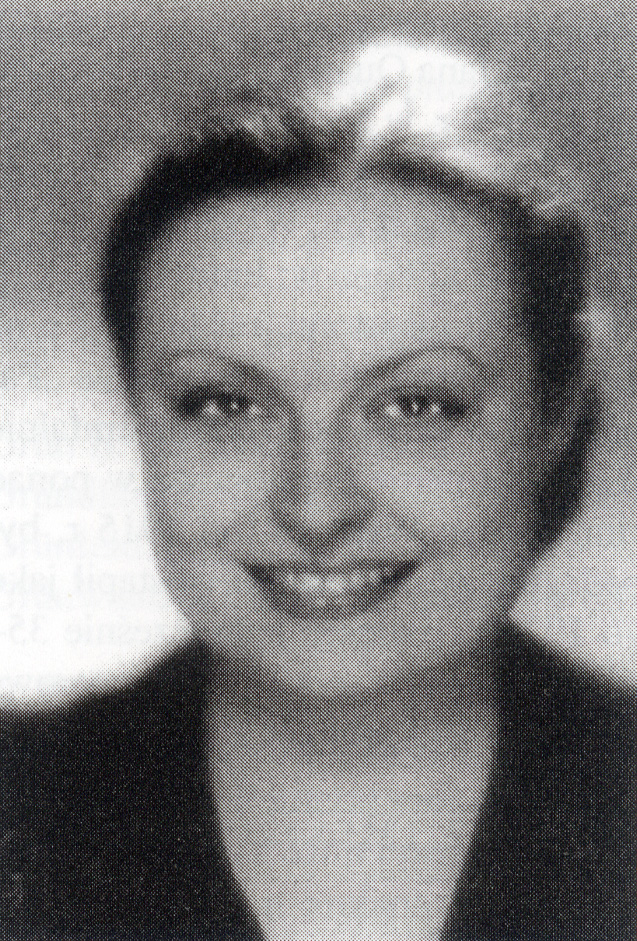
- Wiera Gran

Background information
- Also known as: Wiera Gran, Vera Gran, Viera Green, Sylvia Green, Mariol
- Born: Weronika Grynberg; 20 April 1916; Russia
- Died: 19 November 2007 (aged 91) Paris, France
- Genres: tango
- Occupation: singer
- Instrument: vocals
- Years active: 1934–2007

Wiera Gran, real name Dwojra Grynberg (20 April 1916 – 19 November 2007) was a Polish singer and actress of Jewish ancestry.

Wiera Gran had a low alto voice even in early 1934, when at the age of 17 when—using the pseudonym Sylvia Green—she made her first recording, the tango Grzech. She sang in the Cafe Paradis in Warsaw in the early 1930s. While most of her recordings are in the Polish language, she sang in Yiddish in the movie On a heym (Without a home) with Shimon Dzigan and Israel Shumacher. She escaped from the Warsaw Ghetto during World War II and was hiding in Warsaw-Babice (Boernerowo). In 1950, she moved to France. She was associated with Maurice Chevalier's stage theater, Alhambra. She performed in Paris in the charity concert with Charles Aznavour. The first song which made her popular was composed in 1937 by Adolf Kurc (later known as Eddy Courts) to Gran's lyrics. She traveled to Poland in 1965. Some of her best known songs include "List", "Wir tańca nas porwał", "Gdy odejdziesz", "Trzy listy", "Fernando", "Cicha jest noc", "Varsovie de mon enfance", "Ma Patrie" and "Mazowiecki wiatr".

== Collaboration case ==
After the war, in 1945, Gran was accused in Poland by Jonas Turkow and Adolf Berman of collaboration with the Germans during World War II. Władysław Szpilman said in the court that he had heard of her collaboration in "Aryan" Warsaw during the war since August 1943. Marek Edelman (Kommandant of the Ghetto Uprising in Warsaw) said on 5 May 1945 that he heard about the collaboration of Wiera Gran with the Gestapo. He heard also that a death sentence was imposed against her by the Home Army (Armia Krajowa – AK), but Gran was not found, and therefore it did not come to enforcement. In 1947, the Citizen's Court of the Central Committee of Polish Jews (Sąd Obywatelski przy Centralnym Komitecie Żydów Polskich) heard the case and Gran was found not guilty in 1949.

Wiera Gran later tried to emigrate to Israel where she had to face similar accusations by Jonas Turkow, Adolf Berman, and Pesach Burstein and was boycotted. She attempted to clear her name in courts there but the trial was finally suspended in 1982. Antoni Marianowicz, who was 16 at the time of Germany's invasion of Poland, considered the accusations to be "profoundly idiotic", but Marianowicz says himself in his book that he stayed for most of the war outside of the ghetto in "Aryan" Warsaw. Marianowicz claims Wiera Gran was a "singer and only a singer" and was known to him for her philanthropy. In her book Sztafeta Oszczerców published in 1980 in Paris, Gran gives her own account of events and argues her innocence accusing Jonas Turkow of collaboration with the Gestapo. Joanna Szczęsna in 2010 Gazeta Wyborcza Szczęsna posits that the accusations against Gran were based on personal animosities between Gran and Jonas Turkow and Władyslaw Szpilman. Szczęsna quotes, from documents preserved in the Jewish Historical Institute in Warsaw, statements made by Grans friends such as Jerzy Jurandot, Krystyna Żywulska and Izabela Czajka-Stachowicz, all of whom claimed that the accusations against Wiera Gran were based on hearsay.

Wiera Gran is buried in the Cimetière parisien de Pantin, a North Eastern suburb of Paris.

== Recordings ==
- Gdy odejdziesz on YouTube composer Stanisław Ferszko
- Ciemna dziś noc on YouTube Polish words by Julian Tuwim to the Russian Tyomnaya Noch by Nikita Bogoslovski
- the Lambeth Walk on YouTube
