= Klara Segałowicz =

Polish actress (1897–1943)

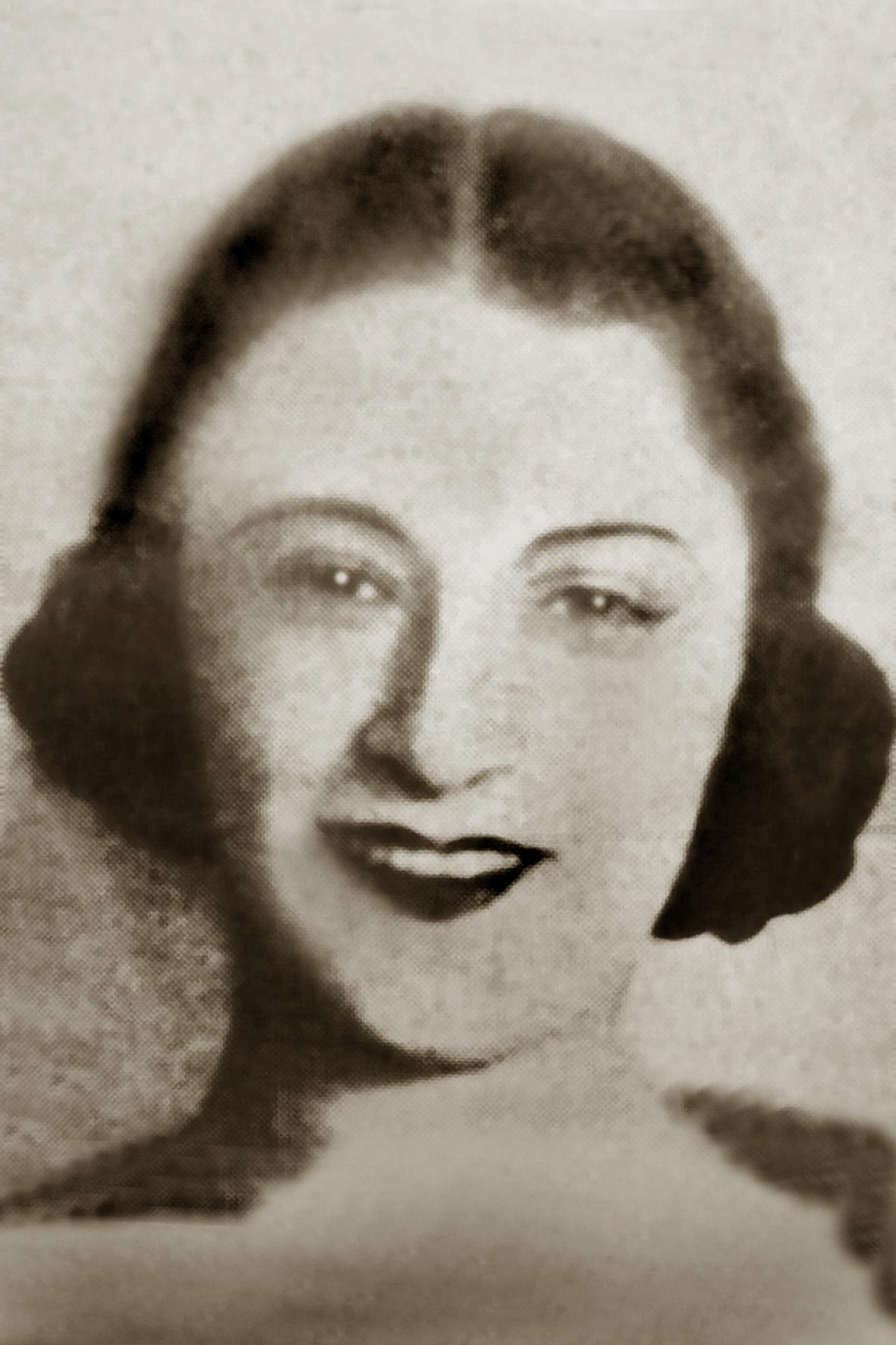
- Segałowicz in 1936
- Born: 25 August 1897; Kyiv, Russian Empire
- Died: 1943 (aged 45–46); Pawiak prison, Warsaw, German-occupied Poland
- Occupation: Actress
- Years active: 1921–1939

Klara Segałowicz (25 August 1897 – 1943) was a Polish actress. She was active in theatre and film between 1921 and 1939. A Jew, she and her husband were arrested following the invasion of Poland in 1939. They were interned in the Warsaw Ghetto and later held at Pawiak prison, where they were shot and killed in 1943.

== Select filmography ==
- Jeden z 36 (1925)
- W lasach polskich (1929)
- Ał chet (1936)
