= Jack Recknitz =

Jack Recknitz (born Hans-Joachim Recknitz; 25 May 1931- 13 January 2013) was a German and Polish actor. He was born on 25 May 1931 in Baden-Baden to a family of actors: Hans-Joachim Zinke senior and Katharina Recknitz. Early in his youth he started working for the Leipzig Radio as a speaker and news anchor, as well as appearing in various theatres in the German Democratic Republic. In 1953, he graduated from Schauspielschule in Mannheim and passed his actors' exams as an extramural student.

He appeared on stage in Annaberg, Parchim, Bautzen and Karl-Marx-Stadt (modern Chemnitz). In 1965 he moved to Poland, where he appeared in over 80 feature films, mostly in the roles of foreigners: Germans, Britons or Americans. While in Poland he was sometimes credited as Jacek Recknitz. Between 1966 and 1968 he also worked at the Polish Radio. In addition to his film work, in 1967 he became a permanent member of the Jewish Theatre in Warsaw, where he remained until 1980. Perhaps his greatest acting success was the role of unnamed "foreign journalist", based on the real-life experiences of Julien Bryan, in the 1978 film ...Gdziekolwiek jesteś Panie Prezydencie (Wherever you may be, Mr. President) by Andrzej Trzos-Rastawiecki. For this role he received the Special Prize at the Polish Film Festival in Gdynia.

Late in his life he moved back to his native Baden-Baden in Germany, where he died on 13 January 2013.

== Filmography ==
- Katastrofa w Gibraltarze (1984)
