= Szymon Szurmiej =

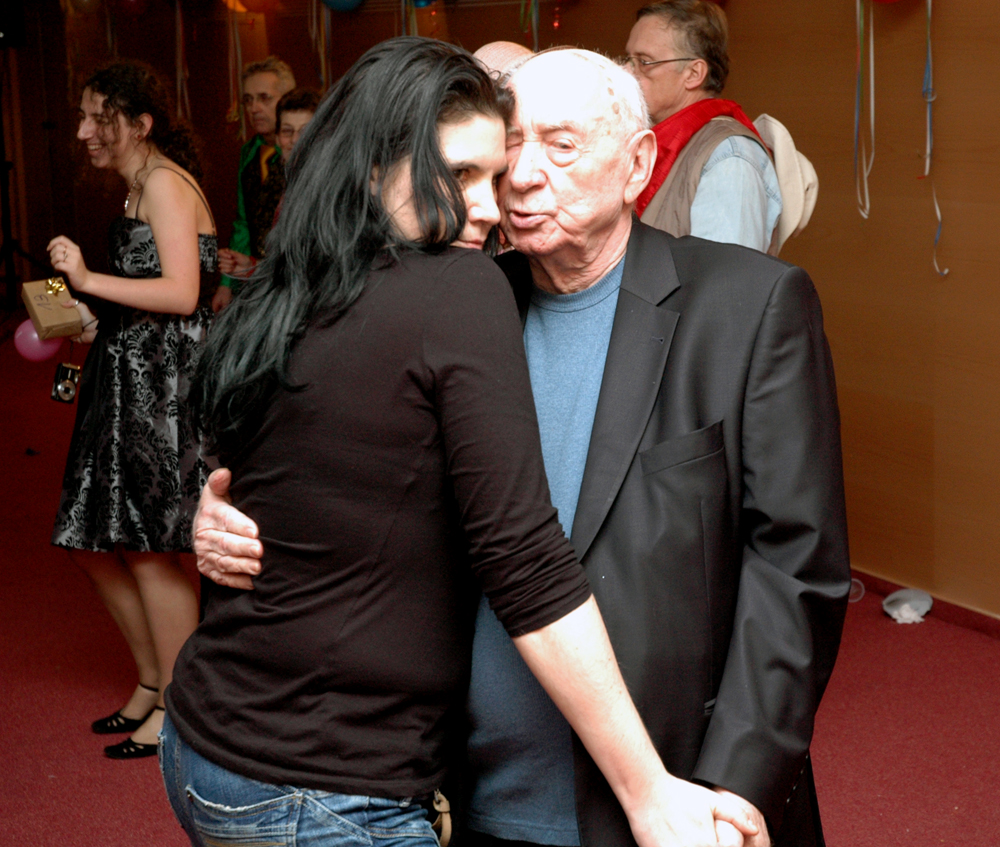
- Szymon Szurmiej celebrating Purim in 2009
- Born: 18 June 1923; Lutsk, Poland (now Ukraine)
- Died: 16 July 2014 (aged 91); Warsaw, Poland
- Occupations: Actor, director
- Years active: 1951-2014
- Spouse: Gołda Tencer
- Children: Dawid Szurmiej, Jan Szurmiej, Lena Szurmiej, Małgorzata Szurmiej
- Parent(s): Jan Szurmiej; Ryfka Biterman
- Awards: For Merits to Culture - Gloria Artis; Grand Cross Order of Polonia Restituta; Commander's Cross with Star of Polonia Restituta; Officer's Cross of Polonia Restituta; Knight's Cross of Polonia Restituta; Gold Cross of Merit; Officer's Cross of the Order Merit of the Federal Republic of Germany

Szymon Symcha Szurmiej (18 June 1923 − 16 July 2014) was a Polish actor, director, and general manager of the Ester Rachel Kamińska and Ida Kamińska State Jewish Theater in Warsaw. He was a director of the Yiddish Theater of Warsaw. Since July 2004, he has been an honorary citizen of Warsaw. Member of the World Jewish Congress.

== Biography ==
Szymon Szurmiej was born on 18 June 1923 in Lutsk, Volhynian Voivodeship as a son of Polish father Jan Szurmiej and Jewish mother, Rebeka (Ryfka) née Biterman. Szurmiej debuted as an actor in 1951 at the Polish Theater in Wrocław. In 1969 he moved to Warsaw, where he has become a general manager of the Jewish Theater. Szymon Szurmiej was a member and activist of different Jewish organizations in Poland and world.

In 2007 Polish writer Krystyna Gucewicz-Przybora wrote a Szurmiej's biography. Szymon Szurmiej died on 16 July 2014 in Warsaw.
