= Ida Kamińska =

Polish actress and director (1899–1980)

- Born: September 18, 1899; Odessa, Russian Empire
- Died: May 21, 1980 (aged 80); New York City, U.S.
- Years active: 1904–1970
- Spouse(s): Zygmunt Turkow (divorced) Meir Melman (died)

Ida Kamińska (Yiddish: אידאַ קאַמינסקאַ; September 18, 1899 – May 21, 1980) was a Polish actress and director. Known mainly for her work in the theatre, she was the daughter of Avrom Yitshok Kaminski (Abraham Isaac Kaminski) and Ester Rachel Kamińska (née Halpern), known as the "Mother of the Jewish Stage." In her long career Kamińska produced more than 70 plays, and performed in more than 150 productions. She also wrote two plays of her own and translated many works in Yiddish. World War II disrupted her career, and she later immigrated to the United States where she continued to act. In 1967, she directed herself in the lead role of Mother Courage and Her Children on Broadway. In 1973, she released her autobiography, titled My Life, My Theater.

For her performance in the 1965 Czechoslovak film The Shop on Main Street, she received special mention at the Cannes Film Festival, as well as nominations for the Golden Globe Award and the Academy Award for Best Actress, making her the first and, to date, the only Polish actress to be nominated for an Oscar.

== Early life and career ==
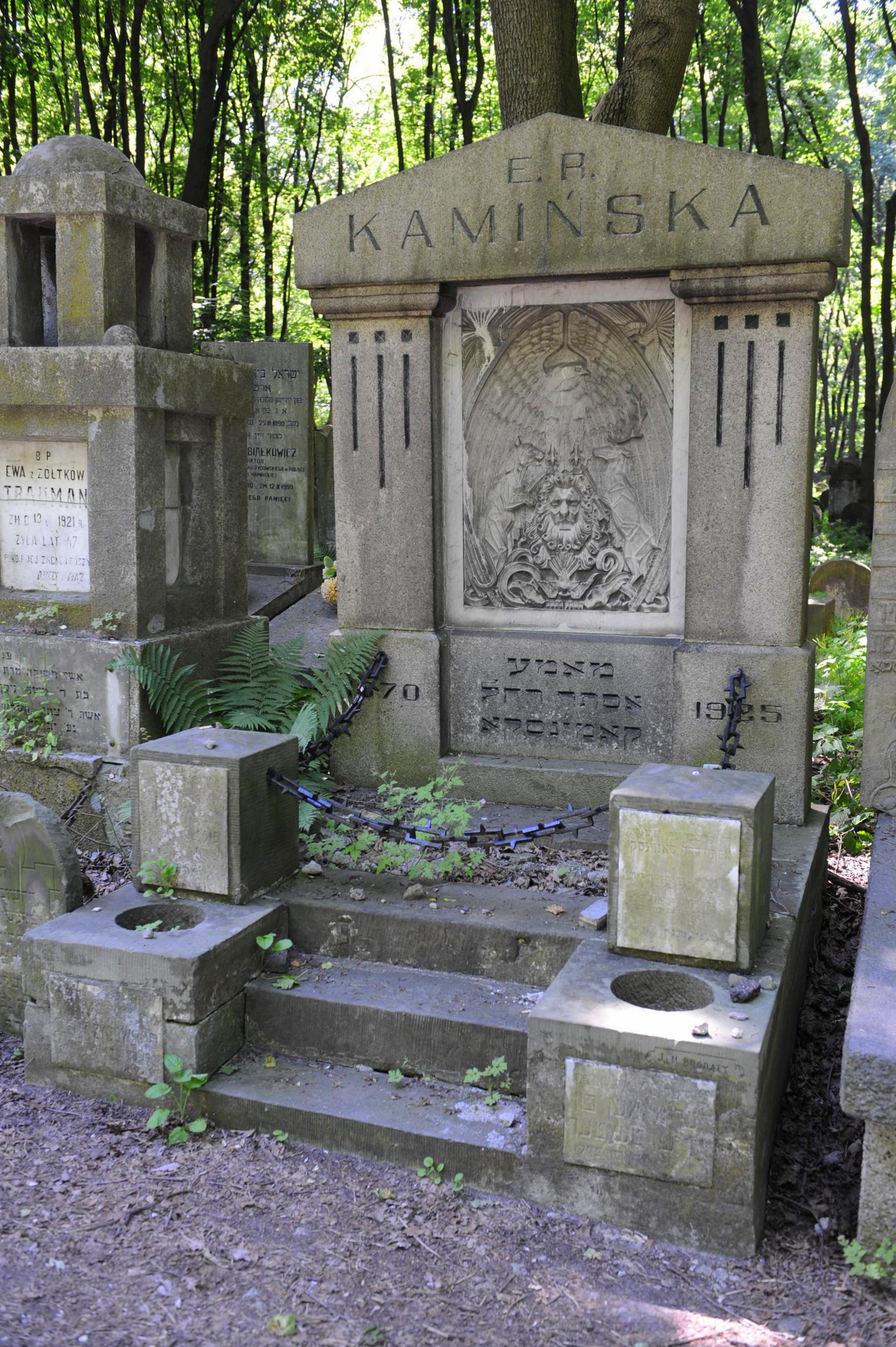
The grave of Ester Rachel Kamińska, her mother.

Ida Kamińska was born in Odessa, Russian Empire (present-day Ukraine), the daughter of Yiddish stage actress Ester Rachel Kamińska (1870–1925) and actor, director and stage producer Abraham Izaak Kamiński (1867–1918). Her sister was actress Regina Kamińska and her brother was Joseph Kamiński, a composer. Her mother was described as the "Jewish Eleonora Duse".

Kamińska began her stage career at the age of six. One of her earliest roles was in Jakob Gordin's play Mirele Efros, as the grandson of the title character, who was played by her mother. She was acting in both tragedies and comedies, as well as directing plays in her father's troupe by the time she was 18.

In 1918, she married the Yiddish actor and director Zygmunt Turkow (1896–1970), who was a member of her parents' troupe. She and Turkow had a daughter, Ruth Kamińska-Turkow, who was born in 1919. Following a three-year tour of the Kamiński theater in the Soviet Union, the young couple settled in Warsaw, and together established the Warsaw Jewish Art Theater, in 1922, with Ida Kamińska as the principal actress. They divorced in 1932, and in the same year Ida organized her own company in Warsaw, the Drama Theater of Ida Kamińska, which she continued to direct until 1939. In July 1936 Kamińska married the Yiddish actor Marian (Meir) Melman (1900–1978).

In October 1939, in the early part of the Second World War, Kamińska and family members, including her husband, Melman, and daughter, Ruth, fled to Lwów (Lviv, Ukraine), which was under Soviet occupation. There she was able to direct a Yiddish theater funded by the Soviet authorities. She and her family took shelter with friends there, and were under surveillance by Soviet authorities, due to their performances being deemed as anti-Hitler (the USSR and Nazi Germany had recently signed the Molotov–Ribbentrop Pact). Kamińska and her family were subsequently relocated to various localities in the Soviet Union, ending up in the Kirghiz SSR, present-day Kyrgyzstan. Her and Melman's son, Victor, was born in Frunze (Bishkek), in Soviet Central Asia, in fall 1941. In 1944 they came to Moscow, where Kamińska again acted in Yiddish productions.

== Post-war career ==
After the war, Kamińska and her family returned to Warsaw. The Polish Jewish population had been decimated by the events of the Holocaust. Nevertheless, Kamińska and Melman made the decision to try to reestablish the Jewish theater. A Yiddish theater reopened in Warsaw in November 1946. In 1949, the Polish government granted a subsidy for the establishment of the Jewish State Theater of Poland, with Kamińska serving as its artistic director.

Composer Shaul Berezovsky, who had also returned to Poland after the war, wrote music for this new theatre. In its early period the theater toured between the cities of Łódź (1949–1953) and Wrocław (1953–1955). In 1955, it was established permanently in Warsaw, as the State Jewish Theater, later named after Ida and her mother Ester (the Ester Rachel Kamińska and Ida Kamińska State Jewish Theater). Ida Kamińska continued to direct the theater until 1968.

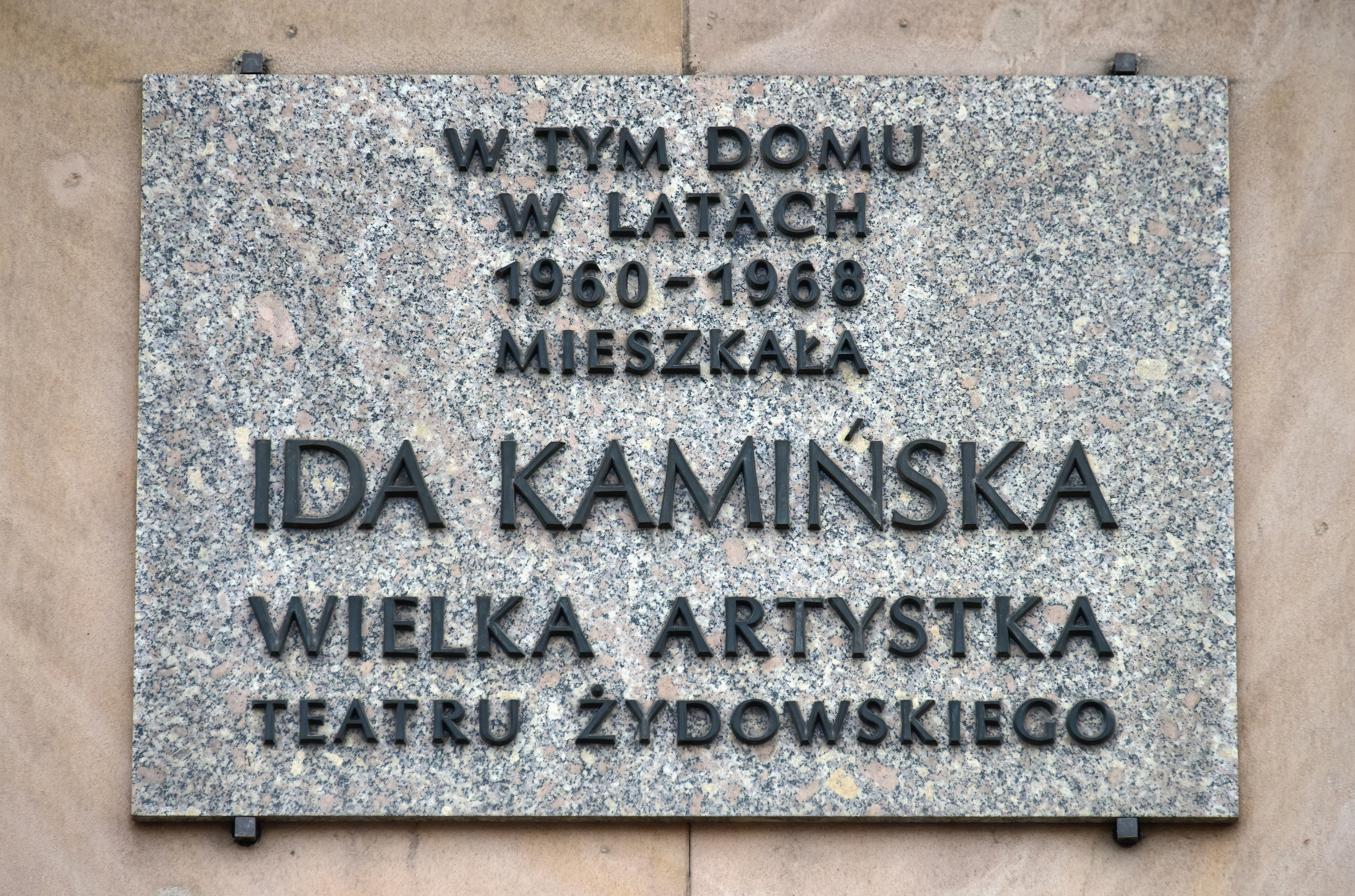
Memorial Plaque in Warsaw, honoring where Kamińska lived.

In 1957, she toured Israel for the first time, where she performed for Prime Minister

In 1965, she starred as Mrs. Lautmann in the Czechoslovak movie The Shop on Main Street (Obchod na korze, directed by Ján Kadár and Elmar Klos), for which she received a nomination for Academy Award for Best Actress in a Leading Role at the 39th Academy Awards, becoming the first Polish actress to do so.

In protest against a government antisemitic campaign during the events of March 1968, she left Poland forever in July 1968, first to Israel and eventually New York.

Her last role was The Angel Levine (1970), directed by Ján Kadár.

== Death and legacy ==
Ida Kamińska died of cardiovascular disease in 1980, aged 80. Her husband, Meir Melman, had died in 1978.

She was interred in the Yiddish theater section of the Mount Hebron Cemetery in Flushing, New York. Also buried in Mount Hebron is Yiddish-American theatre operator Molly Picon.

The Jewish Theatre in Warsaw, Poland is named in honor of Kamińska and her mother, Ester Rachel. In 2014, it held a special exhibition about them. The exhibit featured costumes worn by Kamińska, as well as photographs and memorabilia from her career.

== See also ==
- List of Polish Academy Award winners and nominees
- List of actors with Academy Award nominations
