= Zygmunt Turkow =

Polish actor, playwright and director

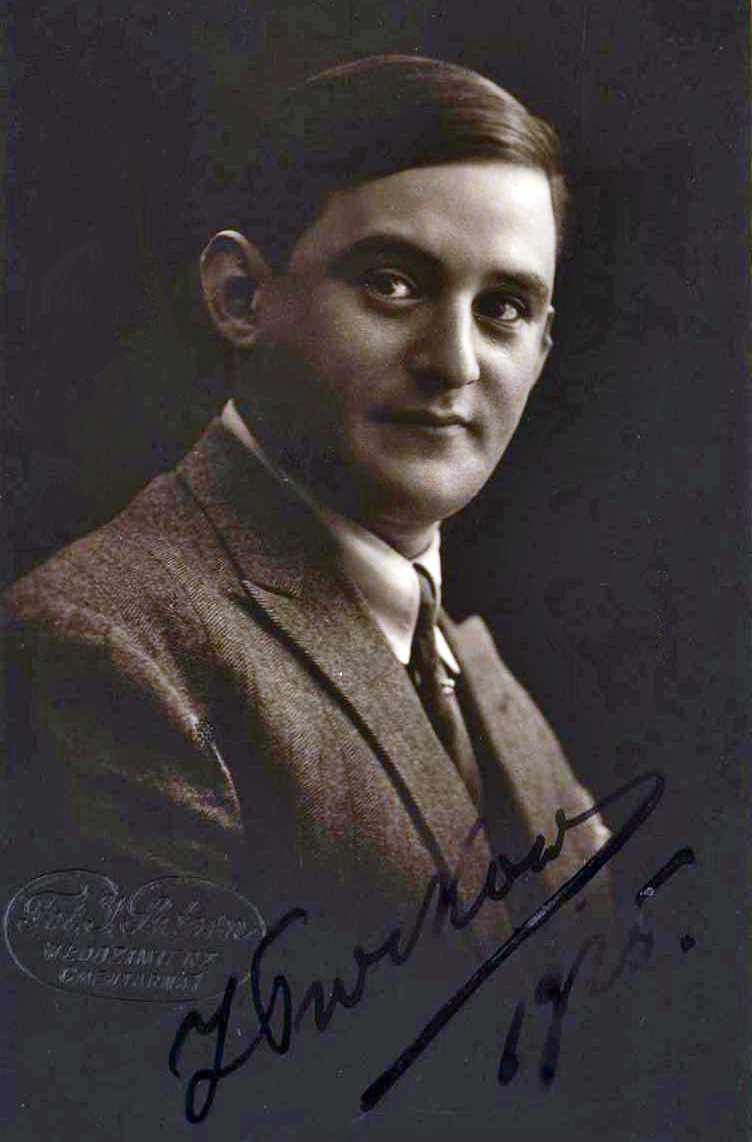
Zygmunt Turkow (1925)

Zygmunt Turkow (6 November 1896 – 20 January 1970) was a Polish actor, playwright, and director of Jewish origin from Warsaw, who became famous for roles in the pre-war Jewish films and stage plays in Yiddish. His brother, Jonas Turkow, was also a noted actor and stage manager. In 1924, he directed and acted in the silent film Tkies-khaf.

Shortly after German invasion of Poland in 1939 he left Poland together with his second wife. In 1940 he settled in Brazil. In 1952, he moved to Israel. Turkow produced works by Iso Szajewicz at the Nowości Theatre, where he worked for many years. He was the founder of several notable theatres, including the Brazilian National Theatre in 1940 and the traveling Zuta Theatre in Tel Aviv, Israel in 1956, where he served as manager and director.

The Zygmunt Turkow Theatre is named in his honor.
