= Ester Rachel Kamińska =

Polish actress (1870–1925)

- אסתּר־רחל קאַמינסקאַ
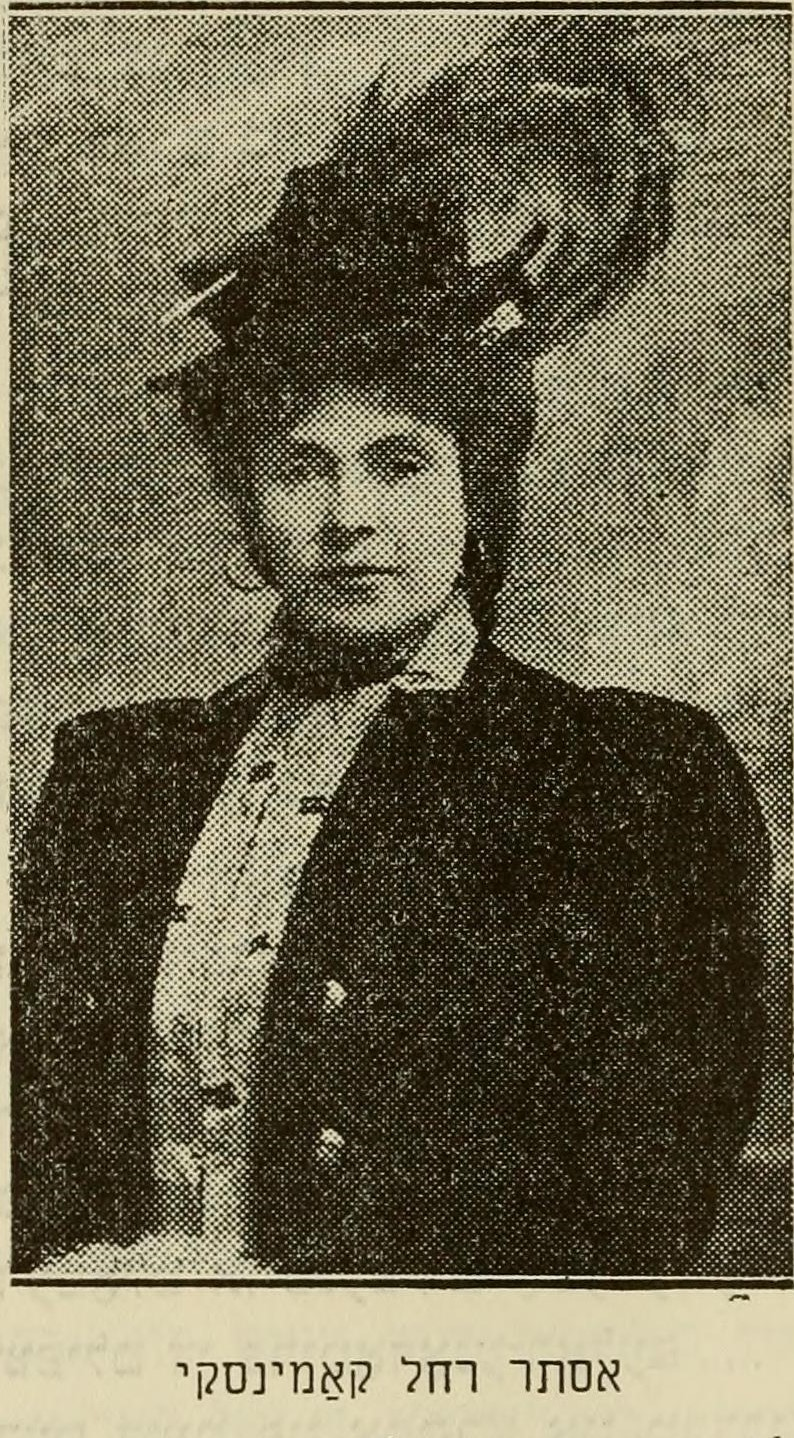
- Photo of Ester Rokhl Kaminska from the book Klangen fun mayn lebn
- Born: Ester-Rokhl Halpern; 10 March 1870; Porozów
- Died: December 25, 1925 (aged 55); Warsaw
- Occupation: Actress
- Known for: Mother of Yiddish theatre

Ester Rachel Kamińska (Yiddish: אסתּר־רחל קאַמינסקאַ; née Ester-Rokhl Halpern; 10 March 1870 in Porozów – 25 December 1925 in Warsaw) was a Polish actress of Jewish descent, known as the mother of Yiddish theatre.

== Early life ==
Ester-Rokhl Halpern was born on 10 March 1870 into a poor Jewish family in the shtetl of Porozów, near Grodno, which had a large Jewish community. She had little schooling and moved to Warsaw to worked as a seamstress in early adulthood. This led to her becoming involved in theater. In 1893 she married Avrom-Yitskhok Kaminski, who worked as a gaitermaker but was an aspiring actor. She became known as Ester Rachel Kamińska.

== Career ==
Kaminska won fame as the star of a series of Yiddish theater companies managed by her husband, Avrom Yitshok Kamiński (Abraham Isaac Kamiński), touring in the cities and small towns of the Russian Empire from approximately 1893 to 1905. In Warsaw, in 1907 they together founded the Literary Troupe (Literarishe trupe), the first Yiddish theater company to dedicate itself to a 'literary' or 'artistic' repertoire.

== Family and legacy ==
She was the mother of three children. Regina Kaminska (1894–1913) became an actor but died young. Jozef Kaminski (1903–1972) became a violinist and composer. Ida Kamińska (1899–1980), the well known stage and film actress and director, who cofounded the Warsaw Yiddish Art Theater in the 1920s, and, in 1946, following the Second World War, performed in reestablished Yiddish theaters in Poland. Today, the Jewish Theatre, Warsaw is named after the two actresses.

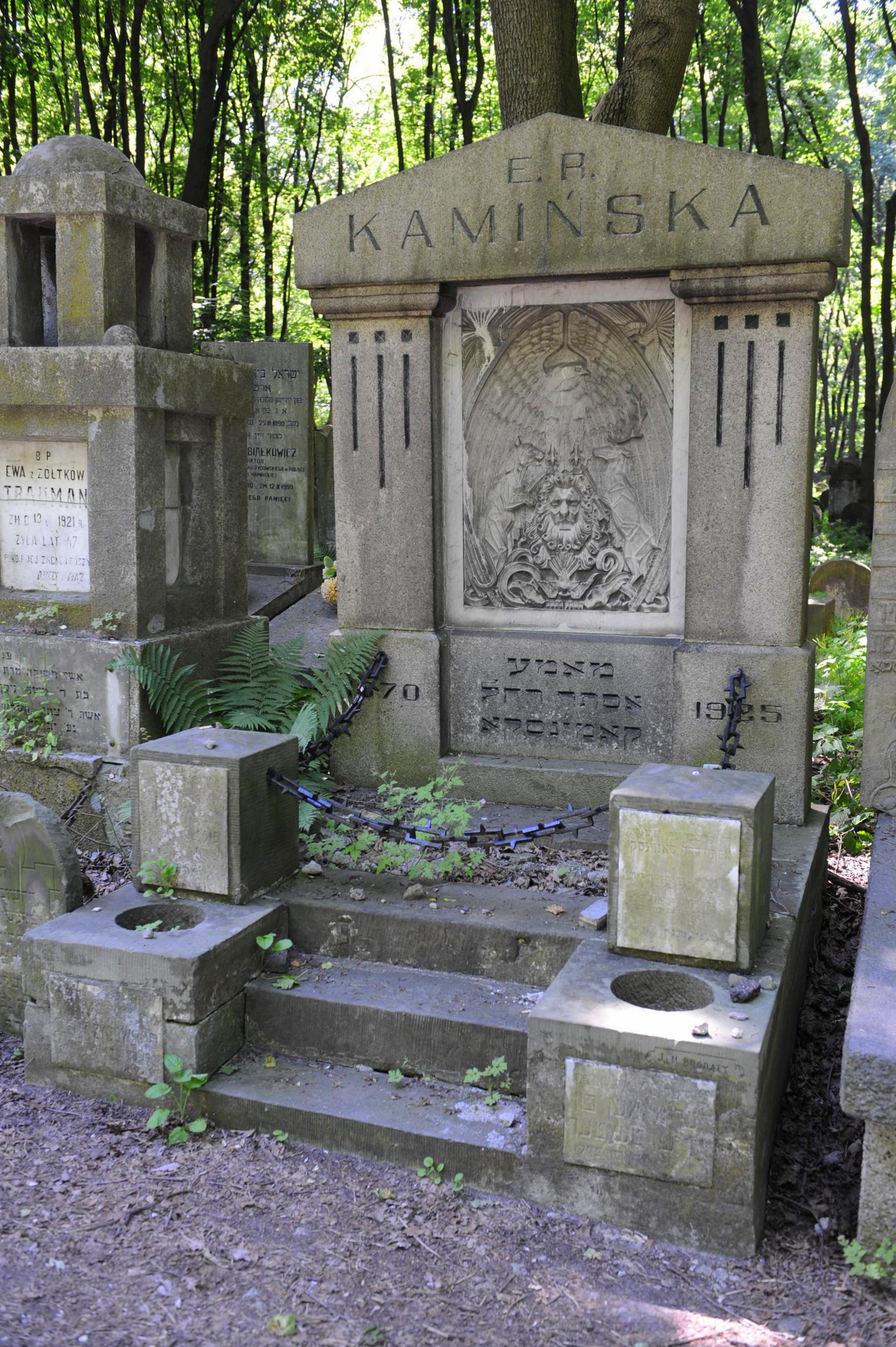
The grave of Ester Rachel Kamińska in Warsaw
