= Menashe Oppenheim =

Polish caberet performer

Menashe Oppenheim (Menasha, Menasze Oppenheim, sometimes used pseudonym Mieczyslaw) (1905–1973) was an American singer, composer, songwriter, collector and performer of folk songs. Born in the eastern borderlands of Poland, in the early thirties he performed at revi-teater in Kovne (Kaunas, now in Lithuania) under the direction of Jonas Turkow. In the mid-thirties he worked at the Scala theater. He then became a leading Yiddish film actor. As a singer he recorded many records in Yiddish. He composed and wrote lyrics. He belonged to the Jewish Section of the prewar Association of Theatrical Authors And Composers in Warsaw.

In the late 1930s he appeared in several important Jewish sound films, including Joseph Green's Di freylekhe kabtsonim (1937) with Shimon Dzigan and Israel Shumacher (directed by Zygmunt Turkow, screenwriter Moishe Broderzon, music by Henech Kon) and Mamele (1938) with Molly Picon.

In February 1939 he accepted Joseph Zeid's (Joseph Seiden)'s offer to play the lead in a movie called Kol Nidre. He left for the United States to do the filming; at the completion of the movie, World War II had begun and Oppenheim was unable to return to Poland. He survived the Holocaust in the USSR-occupied part of eastern Poland, but his entire family died during the Nazi occupation. After 1945 he emigrated to South America. In 1940-1960 he worked in various Yiddish theaters in the United States.

Oppenheim performed in Yoshe Kalb with Miriam Kressyn in 1972. He died on 23 October 1973 and was buried in the Mount Hebron Cemetery in Queens, New York, on land owned by the Jewish theatrical union.

== Filmography ==
- 1937 Tkies khaf (The Vow)
- 1937 Di freylekhe kabtsonim (The Jolly Paupers)
- 1938 Mamele
- 1939 Kol Nidre (Music Sholom Secunda)
- 1941 Mazel Tov Yidn
