= Binem Heller =

Polish poet and activist

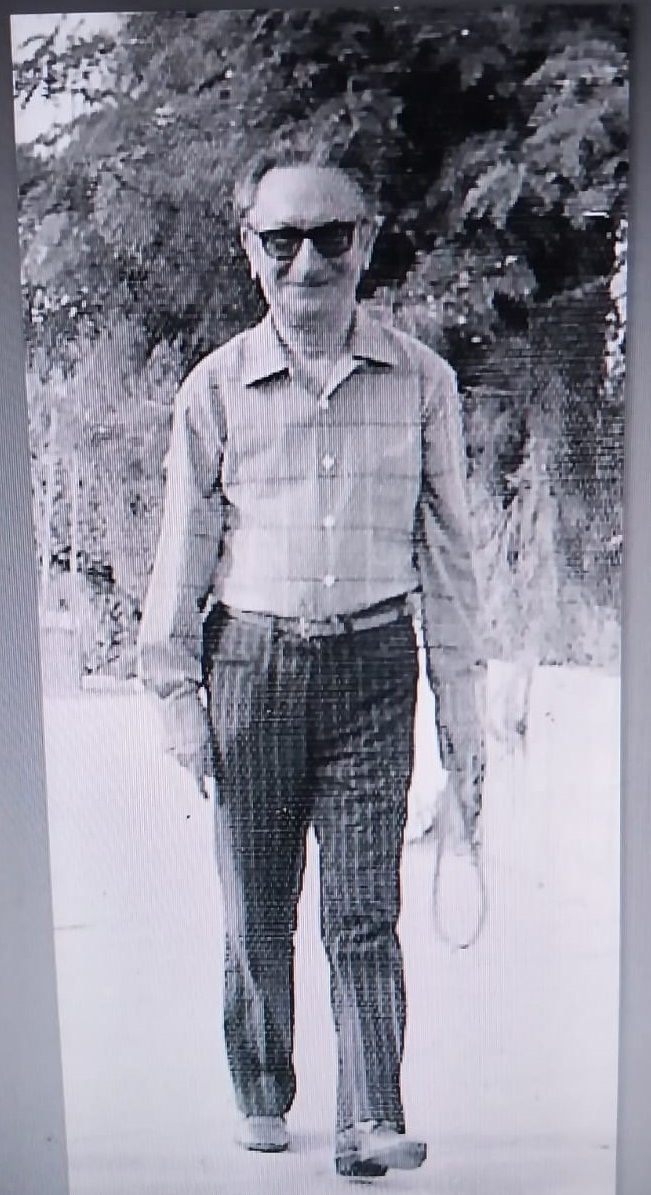

Binem Heller (1908–1998) was a Polish-born Jewish poet and activist. Some of his works were adapted for the theater. He wrote and published first in Yiddish.

== Life ==
Heller was born in 1908 in Warsaw, and became a glove worker at the age of fourteen.

Writing in Yiddish, he emerged early as a leader of Poland's proletarian poets, equivalent to the Proletpen. His first collection, "Through the Bars", was published in Łódź in 1930 and was confiscated by the Polish authorities.

From 1937 to 1939, he lived in Belgium and Paris. He returned to Warsaw, then fled to Bialystok before the Nazi armies. After the invasion of the Soviet Union in 1943, he took shelter in Alma-Ata, where he wrote the poems "Inheritance" and "In Shadow". In 1947, he returned to Poland, hoping to participate in a revival of its Jewish cultural life. Heller helped write the script for the 1946 film Unzere kinder, one of the first films to address the Holocaust. In Poland, Heller was a member of the Union of Jewish Religious Communities in Poland and the Jewish Writers' Union. "Spring in Poland" appeared in 1950, and "Poems, 1932-1939", in 1956.

He then moved to Paris and Brussels, where his poem of political renunciation, "Alas, how they shattered my life", caused a storm of controversy. A year later, he moved to Israel. His many later works include New poems (1964) and They shall arise (1984).

Binem Heller died in Israel in 1998.

== Works ==
- Durkh krates (Through bars, poems), Warsaw, 1930
- In umru fun teg (In apprehension of days, poems), Warsaw, 1932
- Afn vint, poeme (Into the wind, a poem), Warsaw, 1936
- Lider (poems), Minsk, 1940
- Di erd hot getsitert, lider (The earth shook, poetry), Moscow, 1947
- Der veg af varshe (The way to Warsaw), Moscow, 1948
- Durkh shotn un shayn (Through shadows and light), Warsaw ,1948
- Friling in poyln, lider (Springtime in Poland, poems), Warsaw, 1950
- Heymerd, lider (Motherland, poems), Warsaw, 1951
- In unzer tsayt, lider (In our time, poems), Warsaw 1954
- Dos ershte lid (The first poem), Warsaw, 1956
- Klorkeyt (Clarity), Warsaw, 1957
- Naye lider (New poems), Tel Aviv, 1964
- Dor un doyer (Generation and duration), Tel Aviv, 1967
- A boym in ovnt (A tree in the evening), Tel Aviv, 1971
- In varshever geto in khoydesh nisn (In the Warsaw Ghetto in the month of Nissan), Tel Aviv, 1973
- Bikhides (In private), Tel Aviv, 1975
- Dos tsugezogte vort (The promised word), Tel Aviv, 1980
- Zey veln oyfshteyn, lider (They will rise up, poems), Tel Aviv, 1984
- Togbukh af tsurik (A retrospective diary), unpublished memoir manuscript
