= Henech Kon =

Polish composer and cabaret performer (1890–1972)

Henech Kon or Henryk Kon (9 August 1890 – 20 April 1972) was a Polish composer and cabaret performer.

== Biography ==
Kon was born in Łódź to a Hasidic family, and sent at the age of 12 to his grandfather in Kutno, where he studied Torah but also studied with local klezmers, absorbing folk music from players and badkhonim. When his family realized he would never be a rabbi, they sent him to music school in Berlin.

== Theatre career ==
He returned to Poland in 1912, where he was drawn into literary artistic circles of Jewish Warsaw, particularly the "artistic culture salon" of the famous Polish actress Tea Artsishevska (née Miryam Isroels), later a member of the revi-teater Azazel. Her then husband, sculptor Bernard Kratko, introduced Kon to Isaac Leib Peretz. Kon set several of Peretz's works to music, including Treyst mayn folk (Comfort My People) and the play Bay nakht oyfn alten mark (A Night in the Old Marketplace).

"Proletarian Lodz was tired of earnest dramas and light comedies" by 1922. Responding to the new popularity of satire, Kon, along with poet Moishe Broderzon and painter Yitschok Broyner, created the marionette theater Chad-Gadya, the first of a string of revi-teaters (venues for music theater revues) in Polish towns and cities.

He was Moishe Broderzon's closest collaborator, building with him all the kleynkunst theaters in Poland: the marionette-theater Khad-Gadye (1922) in Lodz, the kleynkunst theater Azazel (1925) in Warsaw, Sambatiyon (1926) and Ararat (1927). His was the musical spirit behind all of them.

He later was also closely associated with the kleynkunst venue Ararat. He composed music for around 40 theater productions, including Sholem Asch's Kiddush ha-Shem, Shakespeare's Shylock, Aaron Zeitlin's (Tseytlin's) Yidnshtot, Moshe Lipshitz' Hershele Ostropolyer, Dovid Bergelson's Di broytmil (The Bread Mill), H. Leyvik's Der Golem, and many others.

His opera David and Batsheba was written with Broderzon, and presented in Warsaw in 1924, in a piano version. Kon himself sang in the production, as did Moshe Shneur's chorus. Ninety-five years later, the orchestral version was created in Weimar, during the 2019 Yiddish Summer Weimar Festival.

He is strongly associated with the Young Theater, the Yiddish avant-garde theater company which emerged from Michał Weichert's Yiddish Theater Studio. He wrote the music for Boston, about Sacco and Vanzetti, Trupe Tanentzap, an Abraham Goldfaden spectacle, Napoleon's Treasure, based on a Sholem Aleichem story, and many others.

== Later years ==
After the Second World War, Kon worked with the Yiddish Art Theater in Paris. Beginning in 1934, he also worked in film; he composed the music for The Dibbuk and Zygmunt Turkow's Di freylekhe kabtsonim (The Jolly Paupers), among others. He moved to America, where he was never particularly successful, and died in New York City.
