= Dzigan =

Dżigan, Dzigan, Dzygan, etc. is a Jewish surname. Notable people with the surname include:

- Yefim Dzigan (1898–1981), Soviet actor, film director and screenwriter
- Shimon Dzigan (1905–1980), Polish Jewish comedian

== See also ==
- Dzhigan, Russian rapper
