= Unzere kinder =

1946 Polish Yiddish-language film

Our Children
- Yiddish: אונדזערע קינדער
- Polish: Nasze dzieci
- Directed by: Natan Gross
- Screenplay by: Natan Gross; Israel Shumacher; Saul Goskind; Shimon Dzigan
- Starring: Shimon Dzigan; Israel Shumacher
- Cinematography: Leonard Zajączkowski
- Music by: Shaul Berezovsky
- Release date: 1951
- Running time: 80 minutes
- Country: Polish People's Republic
- Language: Yiddish

Our Children (Yiddish: אונדזערע קינדער, Unzere kinder; Polish: Nasze dzieci, also called It Will Never Happen Again) is a 1946 semi-documentary Yiddish-language film created in communist Poland. It was directed by Natan Gross and Saul Goskind, based on the script by Rachel Auerbach and Binem Heller. It uses a frame story of the interactions of Jewish orphans who survived the Holocaust with popular Polish comic duo Shimon Dzigan and Israel Shumacher.

== Plot ==
A group of Jewish orphans who survived the Holocaust are on a trip from their orphanage to attend a show by Dzigan and Shumacher, who staged a comic skit named "Singers of the Ghetto", as two beggars singing and dancing for food. Disagreeing with the portrayal of ghetto life, they heckle the show. Later, they invite the comics to their orphanage so that they can tell them the true story. The comics accept the invitation and present their best shows. At night, they overhear children telling each other stories of their life. The next day, they suggest to the children that they present their own plays.

== Cast ==
One of the child survivors starring in the film is Shimon Redlich.

== Production ==
It was one of the first films about the Holocaust, particularly on dealing with the issue of "correct" representation of post-Holocaust trauma. Marc Caplan of Johns Hopkins University describes the film genre as "mixing satire, idyl, Holocaust testimony, and expressions of defiant hope". Described as "semi-documentary", much of the film is fictional, including children's Holocaust reminiscences. After the premiere, the film was banned in Poland.

An English-language dubbing was released in 1951 under the title It Will Never Happen Again. The original nitrate print was lost, but later found in 1979, and the film was restored by 1991, with English subtitles added.
