= Jackals and Arabs =

Short story by Franz Kafka, 1917

"Jackals and Arabs" (German: "Schakale und Araber") is a short story by Franz Kafka, written and published in 1917. The story was first published by Martin Buber in the German monthly Der Jude. It appeared again in the collection Ein Landarzt (A Country Doctor) in 1919.

== Plot ==
A European traveler from the North, accompanied by Arab guides, is camped in the desert. When night falls, and the Arabs are at a distance, the traveler is accosted by talking jackals. The jackals speak of an age-old hatred for Arabs, whom they associate with uncleanliness. They relate a belief passed down from their ancestors, that a man such as the protagonist would be the one to "end the quarrel which divides the world in two". The jackals attempt to enlist the traveler's assistance in destroying them, offering him old rusted scissors with which to slit the throats of the Arabs.

At this moment, an Arab happens upon the discussion, and cracks his whip, "laughing cheerfully". He declares the fondness of Arabs for jackals, and the Arabs bring out the carcass of a camel that had died in the night. The jackals begin to feast on it uncontrollably, and the Arab whips several of them as they tear at the flesh of the carcass, until the European interferes. The Arab agrees to stop, and the story ends: "We’ll leave them to their calling. Besides, it’s time to break camp. You’ve seen them. Wonderful creatures, aren’t they? And how they hate us.”

== Analysis ==
At the time of the story’s publication in 1917, neither the State of Israel nor the later Arab–Jewish political conflict yet existed. Some commentators have therefore emphasized the importance of reading “Jackals and Arabs” within its immediate historical and cultural context, rather than through later twentieth-century events. From this perspective, the figures in the story are not understood as direct representations of modern national identities, but as symbolic constructions reflecting tensions within European society itself. Certain interpretations suggest that Kafka’s use of “Arabs” may function as a literary figure associated with antiquity, foreignness, continuity and territorial rootedness, while the jackals represent marginalized groups defined by dependency, ritual purity, and resentment. Within such readings, the dynamic between tolerance, exploitation, and latent hostility has been seen as anticipating later European crises, in which longstanding coexistence gave way to the search for a savior, often imagined as a racially “pure” European figure, capable of resolving internal anxieties through exclusion. These interpretations remain debated among scholars, But they highlight Kafka's sensitivity in noticing certain patterns that would later lead to an escalation of violence that would end in a massacre.

For Judith Butler, Kafka's "short story ‘Jackals and Arabs’, published in Der Jude in 1917, registers an impasse at the heart of Zionism." Butler continues:

"In that story, the narrator, who has wandered unknowingly into the desert, is greeted by the Jackals (die Schakale). After treating him as a Messianic figure for whom they have been waiting for generations, they explain that his task is to kill the Arabs with a pair of scissors. They don’t want to do it themselves, since it would not be ‘clean’, but the Messiah is himself. The narrator then speaks with the Arab leader, who explains that ‘it’s common knowledge; so long as Arabs exist, that pair of scissors goes wandering through the desert and will wander with us to the end of our days. Every European is offered it for the great work; every European is just the Man that Fate has chosen for them.’...The story was written and published in 1917, the year Kafka’s relationship with Felice came to an end.’ Slightly earlier he writes of himself to Grete Bloch that by temperament, he is a man ‘excluded from every soul-sustaining community on account of his non-Zionist (I admire Zionism and am nauseated by it), non-practising Judaism’."

Walter Herbert Sokel describes the role of the European as a Messiah figure to the jackals, observing that the jackals at times refer to the protagonist with the words "Oh lord" and "oh dear lord". The jackals' need for a Messiah is an "admission of helplessness", which ultimately "links the parasitic with the religious." Sokel finds Kafka's tale reminiscent of Nietzsche's On the Genealogy of Morality:

The sovereignly cheerful mockery and the ultimately good-natured tolerance exercised by the contemptuously benevolent figure of the Arab stands in remarkable contrast to the irrational and murderous hatred of the ascetic spiritualist. Evil, the monstrous product of impotent hate, exists only for the ascetics, the jackals. "The hell" they see in the Arabs is their point of view, their fabrication. For the dominant Arabs, who, thanks to their strength, feel secure and free from jealousy, there is no evil. Their archenemies are nothing more than cause for amused astonishment.

On the Genealogy of Morality features a parable of its own, in which vengeful lambs condemn birds of prey as evil; the birds of prey, rather than reciprocating this hatred, suggest that they love the lambs—in part because "there is nothing tastier".

Noting that "Jackals and Arabs" was initially published in a Zionist magazine, some observers have suggested that the jackals may represent Orthodox Jews, who looked to a Messiah for salvation. This perspective posits a critical Zionist perspective of Western Jewry: "As parasitic animals who rely on others to provide their food, they typify the lack of self-reliance ascribed by Zionists to Western Jews." The jackals' inability to kill for food on their own has been argued to be suggestive of Jewish ritual practices. The reading of jackals as Jews has been taken up by other critics as an allegory of Jewish-Arab relations, Kafka "caricaturing the concept of the Chosen People who appear as intolerant of the Arab culture as the Arab culture is of them."

Gregory Triffit has suggested that to attempt to "find sources" for Kafka's tale is a futile endeavor, owing to the "very multiplicity of equally valid or invalid equivalents".

== Adaptations ==
- Shakale und Araber - a short movie directed by the German-speaking French film maker Jean-Marie Straub in 2011 (with Barbara Ulrich, Giorgio Passerone, Jubarite Semaran).
