= Young Theater =

Experimental Yiddish theatre in Warsaw from 1929 to 1939

- יינג טעאטער
- Teatr Młodych
- Address: 19 Długa Street; Warsaw; Poland
- Owner: Michał Weichert
- Type: Experimental theatre
- Event: Yiddish theatre

Construction
- Opened: 1929
- Closed: 1939

Young Theater (Polish: Teatr Młodych, Yiddish: יינג טעאטער) was an experimental theatre started in Warsaw in 1929 by Michał Weichert, with support from the Kultur Lige. The theater aimed to teach new actors from working-class backgrounds, who often had some amateur experience. Weichert set up stages throughout the hall or venue, and immersed with the audience, using lighting to direct the attention of the audience.

Several prominent members of Yiddish drama in Warsaw were involved with the theater, such as composer Henech Kon, set designer Szymon Syrkus, and director Jakub Rotbaum. Young Theater had limited resources and faced frequent police incursions starting in 1936, changing its name many times, from 1937, the New Theater, but was able to put on many productions until the Nazi invasion of Poland in 1939.

== Productions ==
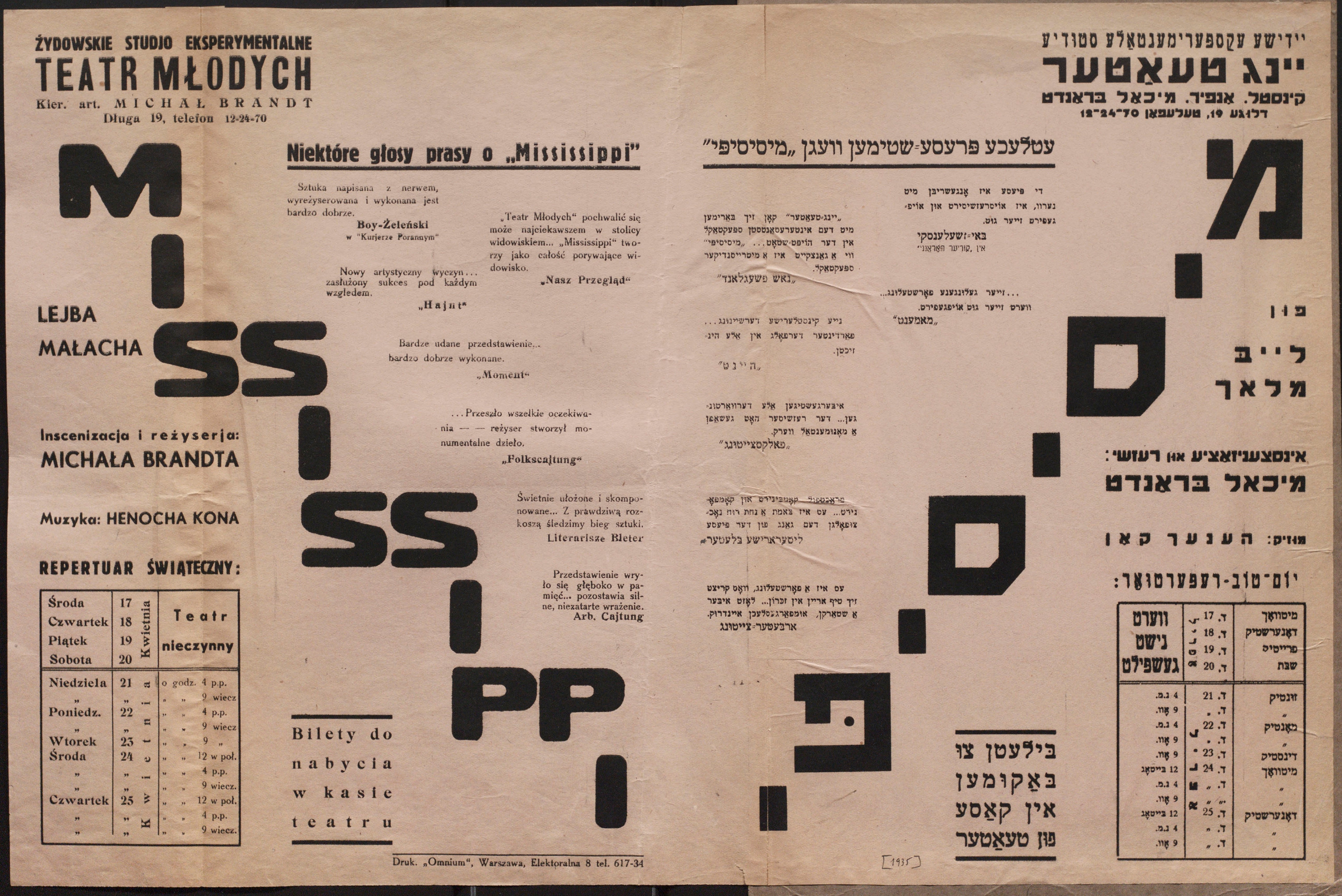
Poster for the theatre's production of Mississippi in 1935, written by Leib Malach

Some of the productions at the theater include:

- Boston by Bernhard Blume (February 1933)
- Trupe Tanentsap by Weichert (September 1933)
- Napoleon’s Treasure
- Krasin (March 1934)
- The Gold Diggers (1934)
- Simkhe Plakhte by Yankev Preger (1935)
- Mississippi by Leib Malach (March 1935)
- Woyzeck by Georg Büchner (1936)
- The Travels of Benjamin III by Mendele Moykher-Sforim (1937)
- An American Tragedy by Theodore Dreiser (1938)
- Kinder fun shtotishe gasn by Halina Górska
- Marzipans by Kadia Molodowsky
