= Yung-yidish =

Jewish avant-garde art group in Łódź

Yung-yidish, also spelled Jung Idysz, was the first Jewish avant-garde artistic and literary group in Poland, active in Łódź in 1918–1921. The members exhibited in Poland and abroad and published an eponymous journal, as well as other literary works. Their leader was poet Moishe Broderzon.

== History ==
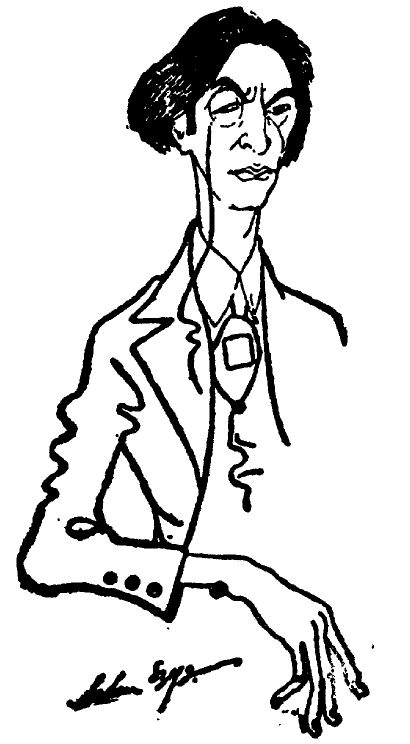
Caricature of Moishe Broderzon by Arthur Szyk, 1920

Founded in 1918 by poet Moishe Broderzon and visual artists Yitskhok Broyner, Jankel Adler, and Marek Szwarc, Yung-yidish was the first Jewish avant-garde group in Poland. Broderzon, who had returned from Moscow, was strongly influenced by Russian futurism and participated in the local Jewish cultural and artistic awakening, Adler had been active in the German expressionist circle Die Aktion, while Szwarc had previously joined La Ruche in Paris. Although the artists drew from the European contemporary art milieu (with emphasis on expressionism), their key goal was to find an essential Jewish national style. Broderzon became the ideological leader of the group.

Over time, Yung-yidish grew up to around 20 members, among whom the key members were Ida Brauner, Marek Szwarc, Henoch Barczyński, Jankel Adler, Itzhak Katzenelson, Pola Lindenfeld, Dina Matus and A. Neuman. The group also welcomed younger artists discovered by its members, such as Elimelekh Shmulevitsh, Chaim Leib Fox, and Yisroel Shtern.

The Yung-yidish group dissipated quickly: Adler left Poland for Germany in 1920 and Szwarc emigrated the following year. The members exhibited in Poland and abroad until 1923.

== Publications and exhibitions ==
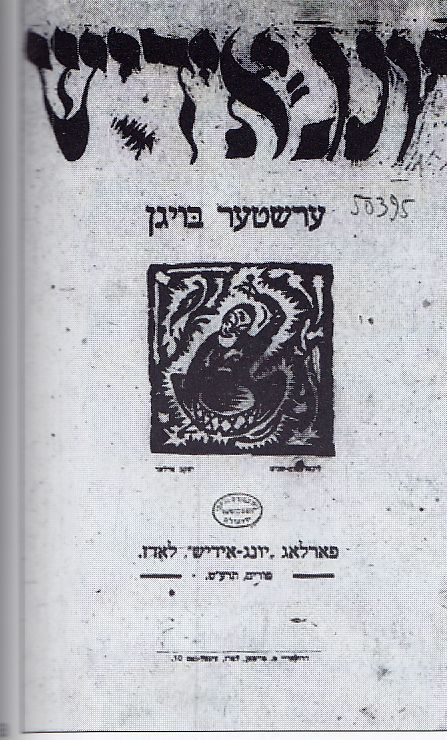
Cover of the first issue of the journal, 1919

In 1919, Yung-yidish published the first issue of their eponymous journal which was the result of a close cooperation of poets, painters and graphic designers. As in the Russian futurist press, text and linocuts were treated with the same importance. The enthusiastic front-page manifesto stated:

What’s trivial and worthless becomes void in the reality of our present [world][…] God is with us, the God of eternity, beauty and the great truth! […] For art! For young, beautiful Yiddish! And for the eternal language of prophets! Without beauty, the world cannot be imagined!

The form of Yung-yidish reflected its avant-garde contents: the magazine was printed on grey wrapping paper as a nod to the industrial Łódź. The group published two more issues in the same year. Articles and manifestos were contributed in Yiddish by, among others, Katzenelson and Ch. L. Żytnicki, while illustrations were authored by Adler, Brauner, Szwarc and Barczyński. Latin transliteration of the journal by German publisher Jüdischer Verlag was arranged, but not executed.

In the next two years, the group published more works: a series of works by Broderzon, a play by Katzenelson and poems by Khayim Krul. Yung-yidish also organised exhibitions and held one in New York in 1922. The group also ran poetry events in Łódź and Warsaw and collaborated with Warsaw-based artists Henryk Berlewi and Vladislav Weintraub. With Berlewi, the Yung-yidish painters established the Salon of Futurists, Cubists and Primitivists. The group also cooperated with other artistic circles: the Kultur Lige, the Picador from Warsaw and Bunt from Poznań.
