= Leib Malach =

Polish Jewish poet and playwright (1894–1936)

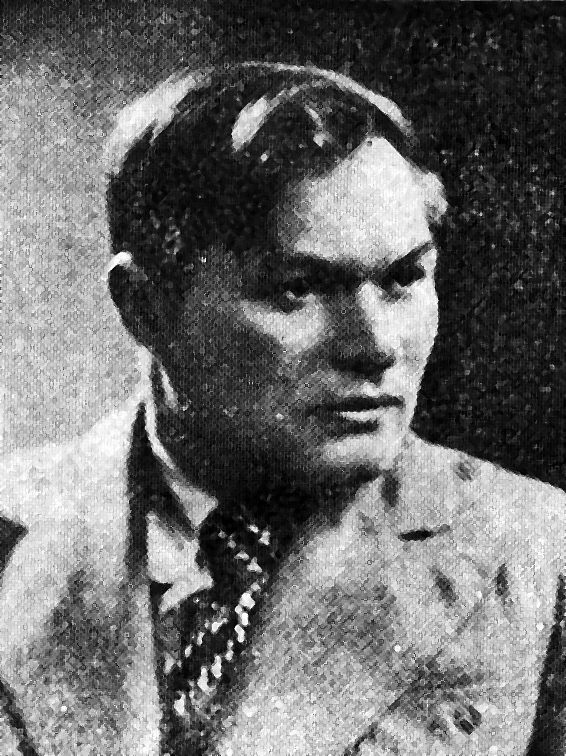
- Malach before 1935
- Born: Leib Salzman; November 27, 1894; Zwoleń, Russian Empire
- Died: June 18, 1936 (aged 41); Paris
- Resting place: Cimetière parisien de Bagneux
- Occupations: Writer; playwright; songwriter
- Writing career
- Pen name: Leib Malach (Yiddish: לייב מלאך)

Leib Salzman (Polish: Lejb Zalcman; November 27, 1894 – June 18, 1936), known by the pen name Leib Malach (Polish: Lejb Malach, Yiddish: לייב מלאך), was a Polish-Jewish writer, playwright, and poet, who wrote primarily in Yiddish.

== Biography ==
Malach was born in Zwoleń, Russian Empire. He learned at a cheder from age seven to nine, and then at a beth midrash, until mother died when he was ten. His father, Rafael-Mendl Zaltsman, an Amshinov Hasid, abandoned him and remarried. He was then raised by his maternal grandfather, Chaim Tenenboym, a dayan. He became an assistant teacher in his hometown, and later in Radom.

== Time in Warsaw ==
Malach moved to Warsaw in 1907 at the age of 13, working several odd jobs as a mirror cutter, baker, housepainter, and wallpaperer. He took an interest in writing from Yiddish newspapers and theatre at the age of 16. Hersh Dovid Nomberg helped start his writing career, beginning with the ballad Three in 1915. He took the surname Malach from his mother's first husband, and continued writing songs and ballads, before turning to novels and plays. He was published in several Yiddish newspapers in Warsaw, Łódź, and Lublin: Varshever tageblat, Haynt, Der Moment, Lodzer folksblat, Lodzer tageblat, and Lubliner togblat.

He became involved in Labor Zionism and wrote the oath of their youth movement. This made him popular among Jews in Warsaw and all over Poland, and he was frequently asked to speak and present his work. Returning to Radom in 1921, he became a newspaper editor. He published two books and two children's plays in 1922 before moving to Argentina that year.

== Abroad, return, and death ==
Malach's time abroad impacted much of his future work. Inspired by the story of the Maiden of Ludmir, he wrote a play Dos gorn shtibl in 1924, and later adapted it to a full play Di moyd fun ludmir. Based on this experiences in Argentina, he wrote the play Ibergus ("Overflow," 1926) about the human trafficking there, and worked with the movement to end it in Buenos Aires. This caused many theatres to refuse to stage his plays, fearing the brothel owners power. He left Argentina in 1926 and travelled to many countries, including a year and a half in Brazil, but his time there influenced his subsequent works.

He was featured in numerous Yiddish publications across the world. His novel Don Domingo's Kraytsveg ("Don Domingo's Crusade," 1930) is an adventurous and idealistic view of Jewish life in Latin America. His plays were staged in Buenos Aires, New York City, Paris, and Warsaw. He returned to Poland in 1929, and travelled to England, Belgium, France, Spain, Portugal, and Italy. He worked as an assistant director of Yiddish theatre at the Girard Theatre in Philadelphia from 1931 to 1932, and then returned to Europe again. He wrote his most famous play, Mississippi, based on the Scottsboro Boys trial, which was staged in Warsaw in 1935. He lived in Israel from 1934 to 1935, with Labor Zionists, before returning to Paris, where he became ill and died while having an operation at the Rothschild Hospital in 1936. He is buried in the Bagneux Cemetery

== Works ==
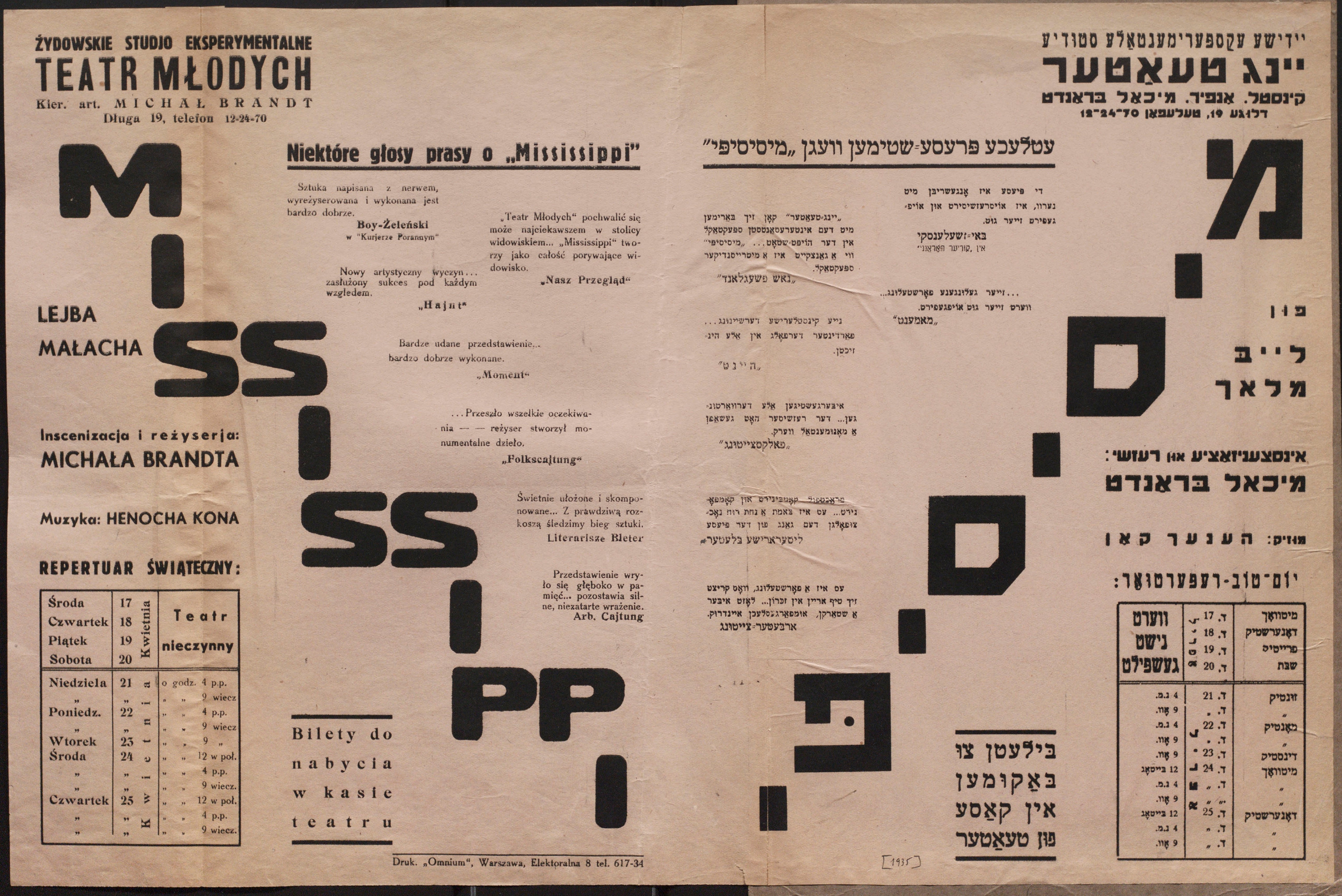
Poster for the Young Theater production of Mississippi in 1935, written by Malach

Malach published numerous poems, plays, songs, ballads, and books:

- Three (1915)
- In Poland (poem, 1919)
- Opfal (play, 1922)
- Lidlekh (book, 1922)
- Meshlekh (book, 1922)
- Der zhabe-kenig (play, 1922)
- Der vilder printz (play, 1922)
- Dos gorn shtibl (1924)
- Ibergus (1926)
- Shtendik-keinmol (1926)
- Leybele tentser (1927)
- Shtendik--keinmol (1928)
- Petronius (1928)
- Der kritiker mitn sharfn oyg (1929)
- Don Domingo's Crusade (1930)
- Foystn (play, 1931)
- Delegate Doctor Ferfl (1932)
- Mississippi (play, 1935); Mississippi: a Yiddish play about the Scottsboro affair, edited by Alyssa Quint and translated by Ellen Perecman, London; New York: Bloomsbury Academic, 2026, ISBN 978-1-350-32097-0

== See also ==
- Isaac Bashevis Singer
- Sholem Aleichem

== Bibliography ==
- Baker, Zachary M. (2022-05-21). "Leib Malach's Montreal Travelogue, 1930". Canadian Jewish Studies. 33 (Spring 2022): 79–98. doi:10.25071/1916-0925.40265.
