= Dovid Katz =

American Yiddish scholar and historian (born 1956)

- הירשע־דוד כ״ץ
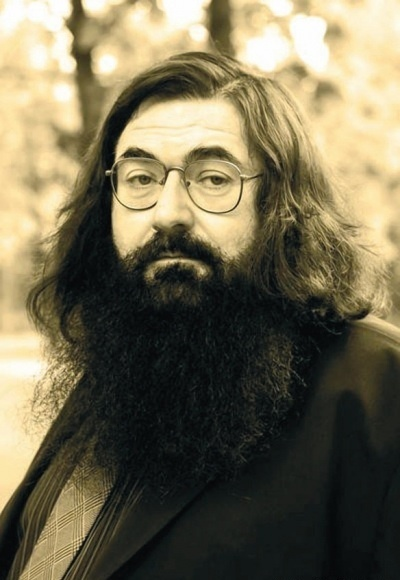
- Portrait of Katz, 2010
- Born: 1956 (age 69–70)
- Relatives: Menke Katz

Academic background
- Education: Yeshivah of Flatbush
- Alma mater: University of London
- Thesis: Explorations of the History of the Semitic Component in Yiddish (1982)
- Website: Official website

Dovid Katz (Yiddish: הירשע־דוד כ״ץ, also הירשע־דוד קאַץ, Hirshe-Dovid Kats, [ˌhirʃɛ-ˈdɔvid ˈkɑt͡s], born 9 May 1956) is an American-born Vilnius-based scholar, author, and educator specializing in Yiddish and Yiddish literature; Litvak (Lithuanian Jewish) culture, and the Holocaust in Eastern Europe.

== Early life and Yiddish studies ==
Born in the New York City borough of Brooklyn into the Litvak (Lithuanian Jewish) family of Yiddish and English poet Menke Katz, Dovid Katz attended the Brooklyn day schools Hebrew Institute of Boro Park and East Midwood Jewish Day School, and then the Yeshivah of Flatbush high school, where he led a student protest calling for the inclusion of Yiddish in American Hebrew day school curricula, and founded and edited the Yiddish-English student journal Aleichem Sholem (1972–1974).

For eighteen years (1978–1996), he taught Yiddish Studies at Oxford University, building the Oxford Programme in Yiddish. His contributions include initiating a new four-week summer course at four levels of language instruction (in 1982), the annual Stencl Lecture (from 1983), annual winter symposiums (from 1985), University of Oxford BA, MSt and MPhil options (from 1982), and a doctoral program (from 1984), these being concentrated in the university's Faculty of Medieval and Modern Languages. Some of his former doctoral students are today professors of Yiddish, at Indiana University (Bloomington) and Düsseldorf among others. He founded the series Winter Studies in Yiddish in English (vol. 1 appeared in 1987) and Oksforder Yidish (or "Oxford Yiddish"), entirely in Yiddish (vol. 1 appeared in 1990). His posts at the Oxford Centre for Postgraduate Hebrew Studies (now called the Oxford Centre for Hebrew and Jewish Studies) were instructor and junior fellow (1978–1982) and senior research fellow and director of Yiddish studies (1983–1994). In 1994, he founded the Oxford Institute for Yiddish Studies and served as its research director until 1997.

After an initial trip to his ancestral Lithuania and Belarus in 1990 (during which he negotiated an agreement enabling Lithuanian students to enroll in Oxford Jewish studies courses), Katz pioneered the mounting of in situ post-Holocaust Yiddish dialectological and folkloristic expeditions in Eastern Europe. He focused on the "Lithuanian lands" (Belarus, Lithuania, Latvia, etc.) and continues work on his Atlas of Northeastern Yiddish. He has amassed thousands of hours of recorded interviews with elderly Yiddish speakers in these regions; a selection has since been organised as the Lithuanian Yiddish Video Archive (LYVA). In early 2013, he began posting clips from his interviews with Boro Park Yiddish speakers, gathered during his return trips to his native Brooklyn.

His publications on Yiddish include his Grammar of the Yiddish Language (London, 1987) and his book in Yiddish, Yiddish: תקני תקנות, romanized: Tikney Takones (Oxford, 1993), both of which aimed to enhance the teaching of Yiddish as a vibrant language both spoken and for new literary and academic works, even if in (and for) small circles. In both works, he advocated a descriptivist stance, rejecting what he considered to be the excessive purism prevalent in the field, particularly in New York. He also (controversially) championed the traditionalist variant of modern Yiddish orthography and authored the Code of Yiddish Spelling (Oxford, 1992; digital reprint, Vilnius 2025).

For a nonspecialist English readership he wrote a history of the language and its culture, "Words on Fire: The Unfinished Story of Yiddish" (Basic Books 2004, revised edition with added academic apparatus, 2007), which attracted both acclaim and robust criticism, particularly over his predictions of a vernacular future for Yiddish based in Haredi communities, and his contention that modern Hebrew could not replace the European-nuanced vibrancy of Yiddish. For years he wrote regular columns for the Forverts (1990s), and from 2005 to around 2010 contributed almost weekly to the Algemeiner Journal on Yiddish language, literature, cultural history and East European Jewish affairs. In 2015, his book Yiddish and Power was published in the UK by Palgrave Macmillan.

He is the author of a number of articles on Yiddish in encyclopedias (including The YIVO Encyclopedia of Jews in Eastern Europe) and book introductions, including YiVO's reprint of Alexander Harkavy's trilingual Yiddish-English-Hebrew dictionary.

After a year as visiting professor at Yale University (1998–1999), Katz relocated to Vilnius in 1999 in order to take up a new chair in Yiddish language, literature and culture at Vilnius University, and to found the university's Center for Stateless Cultures, which he directed for its first two years. He had relocated his old Oxford Yiddish summer program to Vilnius a year earlier (summer 1998). In 2001, he co-founded the Vilnius Yiddish Institute at Vilnius University and remained its research director and primary instructor until 2010. His works on Litvak (Lithuanian Jewish) culture include the folio volume "Lithuanian Jewish Culture" (Baltos lankos, Vilnius 2004, revised edition 2010), "Windows to a Lost Jewish Past: Vilna Book Stamps" (Versus aureus, Vilnius 2008), and "Seven Kingdoms of the Litvaks" (International Cultural Program Center, Vilnius 2009).

Awards for his fiction came from within the secular Yiddish environment: the Hirsh Rosenfeld Award (Canadian Jewish Congress, 1994), the Zhitlovsky Prize (Ikuf, 1996), the Itzik Manger Prize (1997) and the Rubinlicht Prize (2020).

In 1994 he founded at Oxford the then sole literary monthly magazine in Yiddish, Yiddish Pen, and edited its first 27 issues. In 2001-2002 he was a Guggenheim Fellow in Yiddish literature. To date, four volumes of his own Yiddish short stories have appeared. In English: City in the Moonlight: Stories of the Old-time Lithuanian Jews (2012); East Broadway to Whitechapel (2025). In German: Ostjüdische Geschichten aus dem alten Litauen. In Italian: Nóah Anshel dell'altro mondo (2002).

During his field expeditions, Katz encountered elderly Yiddish-speaking Jews living in poverty, including "flight survivors" who had survived the war by fleeing to the Soviet Union and who did not qualify for aid under the narrow definition of "Holocaust survivor". He raised their circumstances in a 1999 op-ed in the Forward, which was cited by Judge Edward R. Korman in the Swiss Banks settlement in the U.S. District Court in 2004.

In 2018, he launched online a draft version of his Yiddish Cultural Dictionary, which is a free online English-Yiddish dictionary that stresses cultural specificities, with all discussions of entries in Yiddish; rooted in his descriptivist perspective in Yiddish stylistics, it contains detailed commentary about usage in Standard Yiddish, and also in both Northeastern (Lithuanian) and Central (Mideastern / Polish) dialects of Yiddish. In 2025, he added to the original format the mobile-friendly edition, which in spring 2026 reached the 50,000 entry mark.

In late 2021, he initiated the Lithuanian Yiddish Video Archive (LYVA) by putting online several hundred (unedited) videos from his thirty years of expeditions to the last native speakers of Northeastern ("Lithuanian") Yiddish in Belarus, Latvia, Lithuania, northeastern Poland and eastern Ukraine.

== Holocaust history and human rights activism ==
After observing the Vilnius scene for years, Dovid Katz began in 2008 to publicly challenge the double genocide theory of World War II and the accusations against Holocaust survivors who survived by joining the Jewish partisans. In a Rothschild Foundation London seminar in February that year he proposed the term "Holocaust obfuscation" for an East European trend to downgrade the Holocaust into one of two purportedly equal genocides (without actually denying any deaths); he refined the term in a 2009 paper, later published as "On Three Definitions: Genocide, Holocaust, and the 'Holocaust of Bullets'".

Katz was apparently the first to publicly challenge the 2008 Prague Declaration in two May 2009 op-eds, in The Jewish Chronicle and The Irish Times. He subsequently contributed articles to The Guardian (in 2010), Tablet magazine (2010), The Jerusalem Post (2011), the London Jewish News (2012), The Times of Israel (2012), and other publications.

Katz's work on the Holocaust in Lithuania and related antisemitism issues was among the subjects of a 2010 BBC world service program by Wendy Robbins, and a 2012 Australian documentary film by Marc Radomsky and Danny Ben-Moshe. Katz has participated in numerous public debates on these subjects, including with Yale historian Timothy D. Snyder, whose scholarship he addressed in a Guardian article in 2010. Katz later reviewed Snyder's Bloodlands in East European Jewish Affairs in 2011.

During the period 2010-2012, Katz has registered concern regarding purported policy shifts toward Holocaust obfuscation and denial and the double genocide theory by the United States Department of State, in articles in Tablet (2010), The Guardian (2010) Algemeiner Journal (2011).

In the spring of 2011, Katz was the Jan Randa Visiting Scholar at the Australian Center for Jewish Civilization (ACJC) at Monash University in Melbourne where he lectured on both Yiddish Studies and Holocaust issues. He presented findings on East European Holocaust obfuscation at Yale University and the Woodrow Wilson International Center for Scholars in 2011, and at a December 13, 2012 ISGAP event at Fordham University in New York City.
