= Natan Gross =

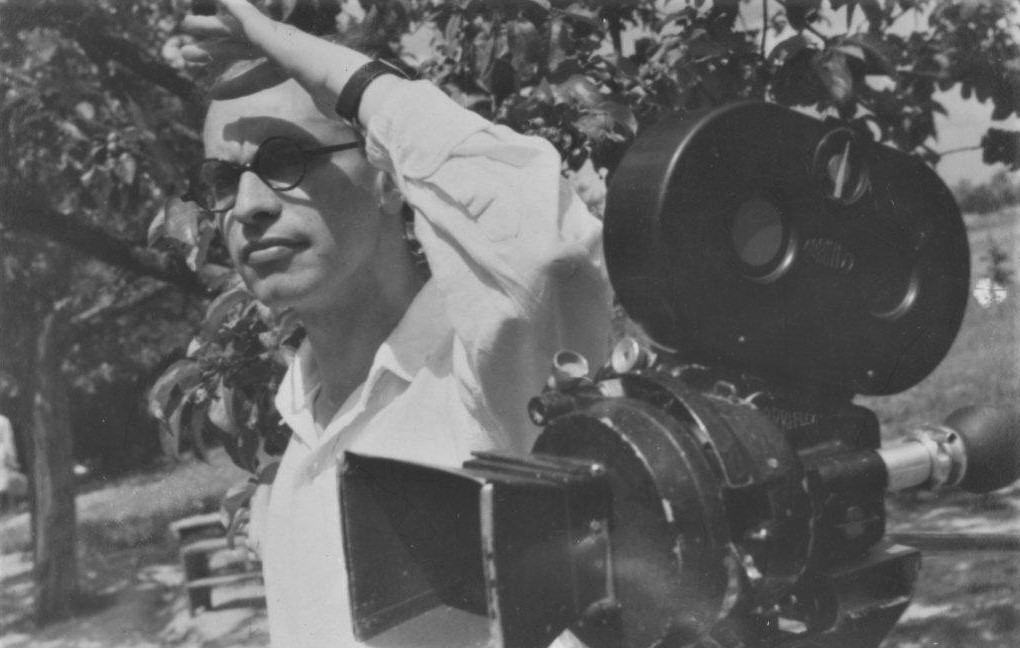
Natan Gross while filming Unzere kinder, 1948

Natan Gross (Hebrew: נתן גרוס; November 16, 1919, in Kraków – October 5, 2005, in Tel Aviv) was Polish and Israeli screenwriter, director, producer, film critic and historian, poet, writer, translator, editor and publisher writing in Polish and Hebrew. While in Poland, until 1950, he shot about 10 feature and documentary films in Yiddish, mostly with Kinor film studio. In Israel he shot about 100 documentaries and several feature films

== Filmography ==
- 1946–1949: Yidishe film kronik (from Yiddish: Jewish Film Chronicle)
- 1947: Der weg cum gezunt (from Yiddish: The path to health)
- 1947: Der yidisher yishuv in Niderschlezien (from Yiddish: The Jewish settlement in Lower Silesia)
- 1948: Der finfter yartzeit un ojfsztand in warszewer geto (The Fifth Anniversary of the Warsaw Ghetto Uprising)
- 1948: Undzere kinder (from Yiddish: Our children)
- 1948: Mir lebngeblibene (We who survived ; in Yiddish, documenting the revival of the social and cultural life of the Jews in Poland after World War II)
- 1948: ORT (vocational education)
- 1948: Joint
- 1949: אחרי אלפיים שנה ("Two Millenia After"; documentary, 12 min. Summarizing the first year of the official presentation of Israel in Poland; Hebrew and English subtitles)
- 1949: Kadima Gordonia ("Forward, Gordonia", short)
- 1962: Joseph the Dreamer (screenplay)
- 1963: The Cellar (feature film; 60 min.; the story of Holocaust survivor, Emmanuel, who works as a security guard on a construction site)

== Books ==
- 1986: Hebrew: מי אתה אדון גרימק? (Mi ata adon Grymek, "Who Are You, Mr. Grymek?"), autobiography. The book title refers to his fake Polish name, Franciszek Grymek, used to avoid the Holocaust.
  - 1991:Kim pan jest, panie Grymek? Translation from Hebrew to Polish
  - 2001: English translation by William R. Brand
- Toldot ha-kolnoa ha-Yehudi be-Polin: 1910–1950/ The Jewish Film in Poland: 1910–1950. [Hebrew Language Edition].
  - Polish title: Film Żydowski w Polsce, 2002

== Awards ==
- 1963: the film The Cellar won the Kinor David award, Israel and "Youth Prize" (Best Feature Film Suitable for Young People) at the Berlin International Film Festival
- 1991:Ophir Award for lifetime achievement
- For the book Who Are You, Mr. Grymek?
  - 1986: Leon Lustig Prize (for the Hebrew original)
  - 1991: Echo Krakowa} Book of the Year for the Polish translation

== Family ==
Natan, born to Jakub and Sarah, had brothers Yoram Gross born Jerzy, and Jozef, and sister Klara. He was married to Shulamit Gross with whom he had son Yaakov Gross and daughter Aliza.
