= Symphony of Six Million =

1932 film

- Theatrical release poster
- Directed by: Gregory La Cava
- Written by: Fannie Hurst (story); J. Walter Ruben (screenplay); Bernard Schubert (screenplay); James Seymour (additional dialogue)
- Produced by: Pandro S. Berman; David O. Selznick
- Starring: Ricardo Cortez; Irene Dunne; Gregory Ratoff
- Cinematography: Leo Tover
- Edited by: Archie Marshek
- Music by: Max Steiner
- Production company: RKO Radio Pictures
- Distributed by: RKO Radio Pictures
- Release date: April 14, 1932
- Running time: 94 minutes
- Language: English
- Budget: $270,000 (estimated)

Symphony of Six Million is a 1932 American Pre-Code drama film directed by Gregory La Cava and starring Ricardo Cortez, Irene Dunne and Gregory Ratoff. Based on the story Night Bell by Fannie Hurst, the film concerns the rise of a Jewish physician from humble roots to the top of his profession and the social costs of losing his connection with his community, his family and with the craft of healing.

== Plot ==
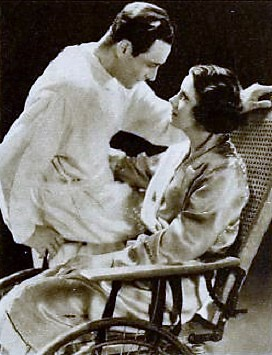
Ricardo Cortez and Irene Dunne in Symphony of Six Million

Felix '"Felixel" Klauber, a brilliant young man from a tight-knit Jewish family living in New York City's Lower East Side ghetto, becomes a physician, as he has wanted to do since childhood, eventually establishing himself as a Park Avenue doctor catering to the wealthy after working his way up from being a doctor at a Lower East Side clinic. He is spurred on in his ambitions by an older brother, who is materialistic and uses Felix's love for their mother to insist that Felix better his station in life for the benefit of his family.

Felix's success causes him to become estranged from both his family and the community back in the old neighborhood, including his childhood friend Jessica, who has been disabled with a spine malady since she was young girl. Jessica becomes a teacher of blind children. Felix begins ignoring the clinic he established in the old neighborhood as well as his familial and community obligations. A blind child, a student of Jessica, perishes as Felix is tardy in offering his help.

Felix operates on his beloved father, who has a brain tumor, and is mortified when he dies on the table. He turns away from surgery and his gift of healing, concentrating on catering to well-heeled hypochondriacs. Then, Jessica—who has loved Felix all her life—requires an operation on her spine. Can he overcome his fears and insecurities to save her life?

== Cast ==
- Ricardo Cortez as Dr. Felix Klauber
- Irene Dunne as Jessica
- Anna Appel as Hannah Klauber
- Gregory Ratoff as Meyer Klauber
- Noel Madison as Magnus Klauber
- Lita Chevret as Birdie Klauber
- John St. Polis as Dr. Schiffen
- Julie Haydon as Miss Grey
- Helen Freeman as Miss Spencer
- Josephine Whittell as Mrs. Gifford
- Oscar Apfel as Doctor
- Eddie Phillips as Lipton

== Production ==
After David O. Selznick became RKO's head of production in late 1931, he put the melodrama Symphony of Six Million (originally titled Night Bell after the Fannie Hurst story it is based on) into production, overseen by Pandro S. Berman. Selznick insisted that the original screenplay be rewritten to reclaim the ethnic touches from Hurst's story. Selznick likely wanted the film to serve as a mirror on to Jewish life, both of immigrants and their assimilated children. He himself changed the name of the film (a reference to New York City's population) as it was "more dramatic and dignified" than Night Bell. He also directed RKO music department chief Max Steiner to use symphonic music for the score and to have music throughout the picture. This was innovative as "talkies" rarely had an extensive score.

The film never mentions the word "Jew" or specifically points out that the characters are indeed Jewish. But it does include Jewish prayers, such as the Shema, recited in Hebrew, and many of the musical motifs are based on identifiably Jewish folk and liturgical tunes. The plot also incorporates a Pidyon Ha-Ben, the Jewish ritual Redemption of the First Born. The film incorporates newsreel footage with recreations of the Lower East Side to provide a sense of verisimilitude.

The movie was a box-office and critical success and helped to establish Irene Dunne as an up-and-coming star. Both Selznick and Berman were proud of the picture, with Berman later saying it was the "first good movie" he had produced. Selznick, too, was proud of the movie as it was one of his most personal films.

Movie critic Mordaunt Hall of the New York Times gave the film a positive review:

It elicits steady attention during its every second... There are a number of excellent scenes of the thronged east-side thoroughfare and here and there some light touches of this Jewish family life....
