= Maiden of Ludmir =

Female rebbe (1805–1888)

Ludmir Rebbe Hannah Rachel Verbermacher
- חנה רחל ווערבערמאכער
- Title: Maiden of Ludmir

Personal life
- Born: 1805 Ludmir, Volhynia, Russian Empire (now Ukraine)
- Died: July 1, 1888 (aged 82–83) Jerusalem, Ottoman Empire
- Buried: Mount of Olives, Jerusalem
- Parent: Munish Verbermacher (father)

Religious life
- Religion: Judaism

Hannah Rachel Verbermacher (Note: Yiddish: חנה רחל ווערבערמאכער, romanized: Hane Rokhl Verbermakher) (1805–1888), (Note: The Library of Congress authority file gives 1815–1892) known as the Maiden of Ludmir, (Note: Yiddish: לודמירער מױד, romanized: Ludmirer Moyd, Hebrew: הבתולה מלודמיר, romanized: HabBeṭulah milLuḏmir) also known rarely as the Ludmirer Rebbe, was the only independent female rebbe in the history of Hasidic Judaism.

== Biography ==
Hannah Rachel Verbermacher was born in the early nineteenth century in the shtetl of Ludmir, Russian Empire (now Volodymyr, Ukraine), to Hasidic parents. Her father, Munish Verbermacher, was a devotee of Mordechai Twersky, known as the "Maggid of Chernobyl", as well as a wealthy businessman. He provided an extensive education for his only daughter, which included many fields of Torah study.

She appears not to have been a remarkable child, but underwent a transformation in her late teens. Declining marriage, she started to fulfill all the commandments, including those not incumbent among women, and increased her Torah study. She gained fame as a scholar and holy woman with powers to perform miracles.

== Rebbe ==
As her fame grew, Verbermacher assumed functions generally reserved for Hasidic rebbes, such as receiving audiences and accepting kvitlach (prayer request notes), and to preside over a tish (the traditional Shabbat meals eaten in the company of one's Hasidim) at which she would offer Torah teachings and pass shirayim (leftovers from a rebbe's meal), although many accounts say that she did so from behind a screen out of modesty.

However, she remained an anomaly and had to withstand strong opposition from the fiercely traditional Hasidic community, who were made ill at ease by this unusual woman. At some point the pressure for her to refrain from her activities grew strong, and her father asked her to consult with his rebbe, Mordechai Twersky, the Maggid of Chernobyl, on the matter. The Maggid convinced her to discontinue her unusual behavior, and encouraged her to marry and assume the traditional role for Hasidic women.

== Later years and death ==
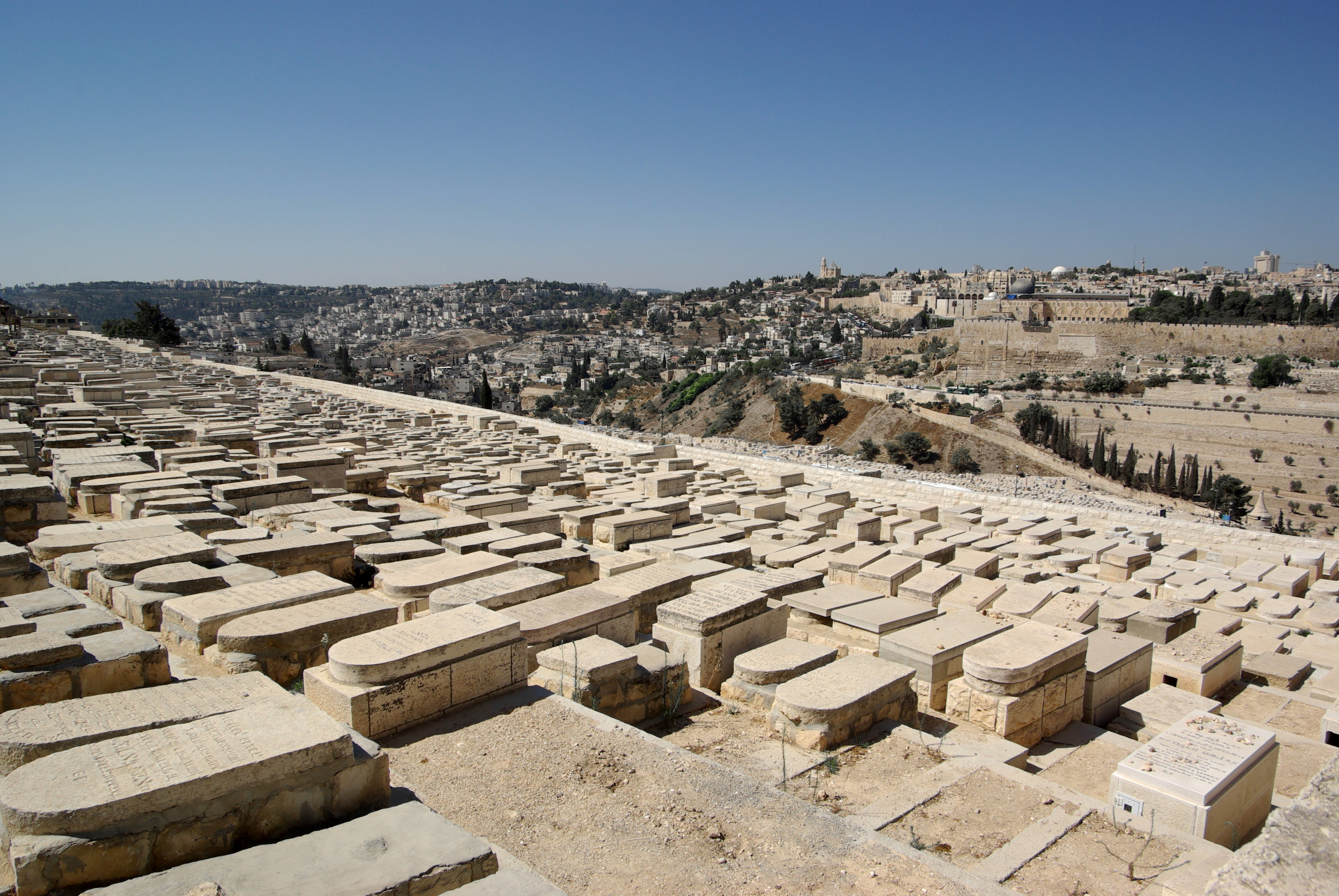
Mount of Olives cemetery

After the visit to the Rebbe, Verbermacher temporarily halted her activities as a Hasidic leader and teacher. She even married, although it is disputed how long the marriage lasted.

Later, she immigrated to the Land of Israel and settled in Jerusalem, where she attracted a small group of followers. On Shabbat afternoons, they would come to hear her recite words of Torah, and on Rosh Chodesh she would accompany them to Rachel's Tomb for prayer. She died on July 1, 1888, and was buried on the Mount of Olives.

== In popular culture ==
Werbermacher's life has inspired numerous works of art, the first of which was a play by Leib Malach, Dos Gorn Shtibl (later renamed The Maiden of Ludmir), which gives her name as Feigl, but correctly states the name of her house of worship. In the play, the author addresses the issue of happiness and discusses the contradictions that arise between tradition and the desires of specific individuals. Malach also explores this theme in his poem Tefile.

Her biography influenced Isaac Bashevis Singer's Shosha. Claims of her being possessed inspired An-sky's play The Dybbuk, which enjoyed great success, and was later adapted into film, and several plays. Other works dedicated to her include the poems Di moid fun Ludmir davent (1947) by Kehos Kliger, Di ludmirer moid kumt tzurik fun vistn vogl by Jacob Glatstein, and Hannah Rachel of Ludmir by Sarah Friedland-ben Artza; the novels Ha-betulah mi-Ludmir (1950) by Yohanan Tverskoy and They Called Her Rebbe (1991) by Gershon Winkler.

== See also ==
- Timeline of women rabbis

== Bibliography ==
- Bar-Itzhak (2009). "The Legend of the Jewish Holy Virgin of Ludmir: A Folkloristic Perspective". Journal of Folklore Research. 46 (3): 269–292. doi:10.2979/jfr.2009.46.3.269. JSTOR 10.2979/jfr.2009.46.3.269. S2CID 161754482.
- Deutsch, Nathaniel (2003). The Maiden of Ludmir: A Jewish Holy Woman and Her World. Berkeley and Los Angeles, California: University of California Press. p. 75. ISBN 0-520-23191-0.
