= Henoch Barczyński =

Polish artist (1896–1941)

- Born: 15 December 1896; Lodz, Russian Empire (modern-day Łódź, Poland)
- Died: c. 14 March 1941 (aged 44); Tomaszów Mazowiecki, German-occupied Poland

Henoch (Henryk) Barczyński (15 December 1896 c. 14 March 1941) was a Polish painter, graphic artist, illustrator of Jewish descent.

== Biography ==
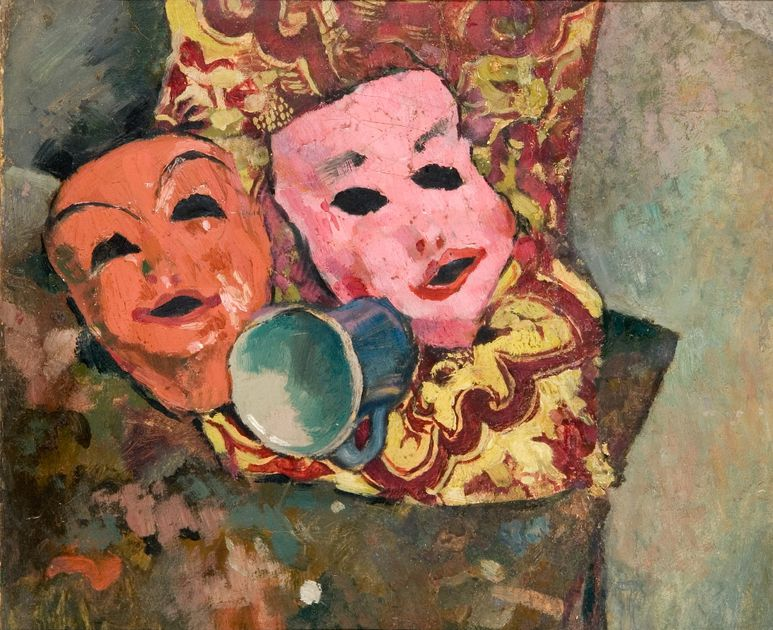
The Masks, painted sometime after 1933

Henoch Barczyński was a son of Szmul Barczyński, a tailor, and Sara (née Parzęczewska). Between 1912 and 1914, he studied graphics in Jakub Katsenbogen's drawing school in Łódź. Later he was a pupil of Henryk Glicenstein in Warsaw. From 1919 until 1926, he studied painting at the Academy of Fine Art in Dresden. He was connected with the artistic group Yung-yidish in Łódź. In 1925, he won the first prize for a propaganda poster during the International Red Cross Contest. He visited France, Spain and Italy. He spend some months in Paris and Prague. Between 1927 and 1933, he lived in Berlin. In 1933, he returned to Łódź. From 1933 until 1939 he lived in his hometown.

In September 1939, he settled in Tomaszów Mazowiecki. In this town, he created an artistic circle. He is mentioned six times in Lutek Orenbach's Letters from the Tomaszów Ghetto. The last mention is dated (25 December 1940).

He was killed by the Nazis in 1941 (probably 14 March) in Tomaszów Mazowiecki.

== Artistic works ==
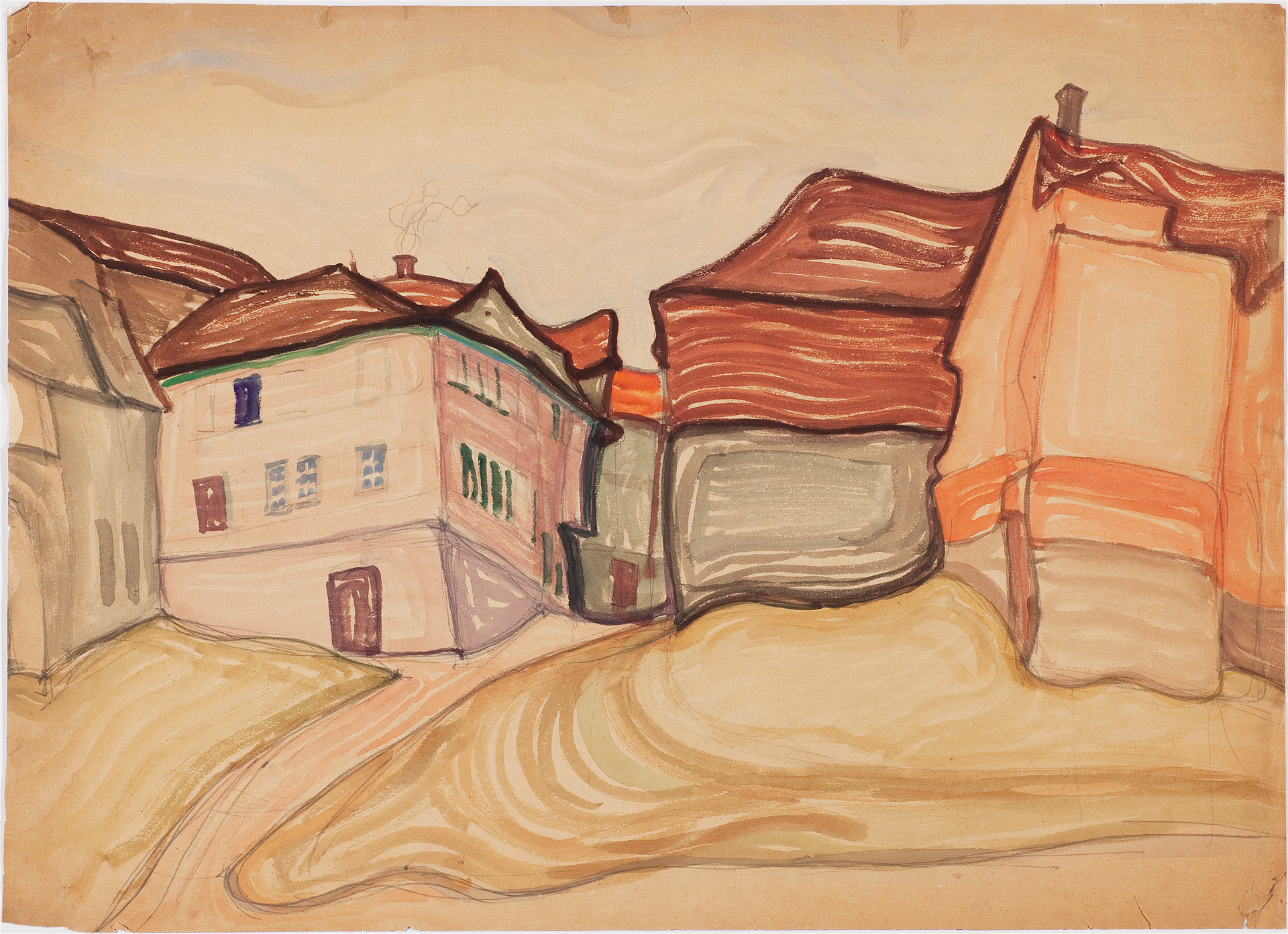
Cityscape, c. 1930

Barczyński's artistic works were influenced by Marc Chagall and Oskar Kokoschka, and motivated by the everyday life of the Polish Jews. He painted in water colors, practiced copper plate engraving and etching. His artworks have been exhibited in Berlin, Dresden, Tel Aviv, New York City and Łódź.

== Bibliography ==
- A. M. Dorman, Autour de l’art juif. Encyclopédie universelle des peintres, sculpteurs et photographes, Chatou 2003, s. 24, sv. Henryk Barczynski, 1896-1941.
- Andrzej Kempa, Marek Szukalak, The Biographical Dictionary of the Jews from Lodz, Łódź 2006: Oficyna Bibliofilów and Fundacja Monumentum Iudaicum Lodzense, pp. 17–18, ISBN 83-87522-83-X, sv. Barczyński (BarcińskI) Henoch (Henryk).
- Józef Sandel, Barczyński (Barciński) Henryk (Henoch), [w:] Słownik artystów polskich i obcych w Polsce działających. Malarze, rzeźbiarze, graficy [Dictionary of the Polish and Foreign Artists worked in Poland. Painters, sculptors, graphic artists], vol. 1 (A-C), Wrocław - Warszawa - Kraków - Gdańsk 1971, pp. 213–214 (in Polish).
- Krzysztof Tomasz Witczak, Słownik biograficzny Żydów tomaszowskich [The Biographical Dictionary of Jews from Tomaszów Mazowiecki], Łódź - Tomaszów Mazowiecki 2010: Łódź University Press, ISBN 978-83-7525-358-0. pp. 32–35 (in Polish; it contains biographical note, photo, artistic works, bibliography).
