= Michał Weichert =

Polish Jewish poet and playwright (1890–1967)

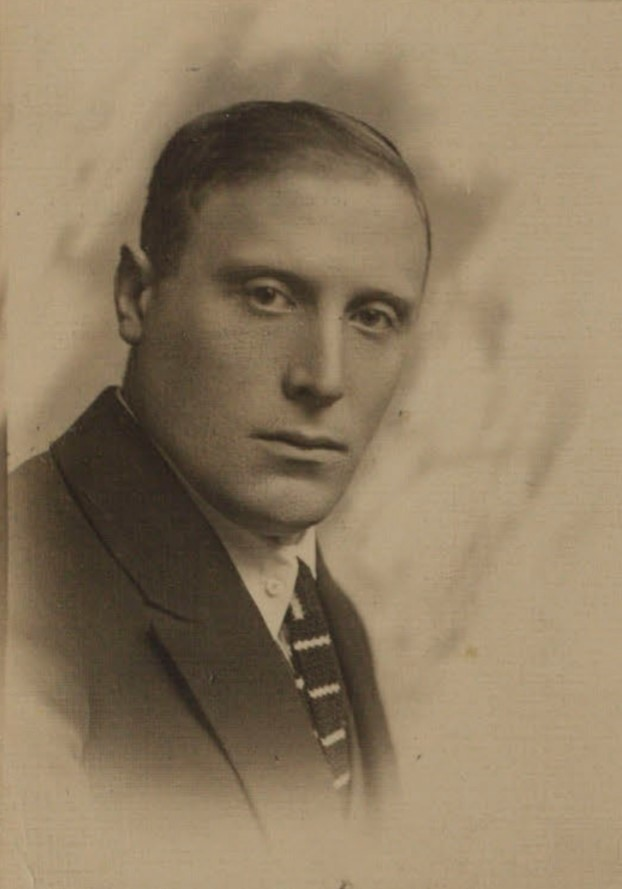
- Weichert in 1923
- Born: May 5, 1890; Staremiasto, Poland
- Died: March 11, 1967 (aged 76); Tel Aviv, Israel
- Occupations: Writer; playwright; director; teacher

Michał Weichert (Yiddish: מיכאל ווייכערט, May 5, 1890 – March 11, 1967) was Polish-Jewish teacher, dramatist, and stage director. He founded the Young Theater in Warsaw.

== Biography ==
Weichert was born in Staremiasto, Poland (now Ukraine) and moved to Stanisławów (now Ivano-Frankivsk, Ukraine) with his parents at the age of three. His father was a grain merchant, involved with the misnagdim (religious anti-Hasidism) and haskalah (Jewish enlightenment) movements. Weichert studied at a cheder metukan, an improved religious school, and later Polish public schools. He attended the Czernowitz Conference in 1908. He was a member of the Yiddishist movement among Zionists who preferred Hebrew.

He studied first at the University of Lemberg, before desiring to study theatre at the University of Vienna. There, he studied language, literature, theatre, art, and law, earning a doctorate in 1916. He moved to Berlin and attended lectures in theatre by Max Reinhardt in 1916 and 1917. He also studied theatre with Max Herrmann at Berlin University. He wrote articles about the history of Yiddish theatre for Der Jude. He returned to Warsaw the next year and began to study Yiddish theatre.

== Career ==
Weichert taught German, Polish, and speech at a high school in Warsaw. He was a legal advisor for the Joint Distribution Committee and other organizations. He remained involved in Yiddish theatre, publishing critiques in newspapers and journals, and became an innovator and distinctive director.

He staged with the Vilna Troupe in 1920 and became its director. Two years later, he founded the Jewish Drama School, and the Jewish Theatrical Studio in 1929, which became the Young Theater, an experimental avant garde Yiddish theatre. He had leading roles in the Polish Yiddish Artists Union and the Yiddish Pen Club.

As World War II broke out, he founded an organization to help Jews in the ghettos and concentration camps. The Nazis closed it down in December 1942, but later allowed it to reopen under their control. An extrajudicial Jewish Coordinating Committee brought charges against him after the war for collaboration. A trial was held in Kraków at a Polish court in 1945, which cleared him of the accusations.

== Aliyah and death ==
Weichert made aliyah to Israel in 1958, where he taught voice lessons for the labor union, Histadrut. He remained involved in theatre and published several more plays. He died in Tel Aviv on March 11, 1967.
