= Anna Appel (actress) =

Romanian-born American actress (1888–1963)

- Born: Anna Bercovici; May 1, 1888; Bucharest, Kingdom of Romania (now Romania)
- Died: November 19, 1963 (aged 75); New York City, New York, United States
- Other names: Anna Berkovitsh, Anna Khane
- Occupation: Actress
- Years active: 1902–1961
- Known for: Vaudeville, stage and film acting
- Spouse(s): Isadore Appel (?–1908; his death), Sigmund Ben Avi (m. 1915–1929; his death)
- Partner: Morris Ross
- Children: 2

Anna Appel (1888–1963), was a Romanian-born American stage and film actress, known for her works in the Yiddish language. She was active in New York City for over 50 years in Yiddish theatre (in the Yiddish Theatre District), and Yiddish cinema.

== Biography ==
Anna Bercovici was born on May 1, 1888 in Bucharest, Kingdom of Romania (now Romania). Her parents Jeanette (née Schaeffer) and Bernard Bercovici, owned a hotel.

Her career started in 1902, when her family moved to Montreal, Canada where she worked with amateur theatre groups. She moved to New York City to marry Isadore Appel (Isidor Appel), who died in 1908. In 1904, she joined a Yiddish vaudeville company in New York City; and in 1918, she joined Maurice Schwartz’s Yiddish Art Theatre in New York City. In 1915, she married Sigmund Ben Avi.

Appel continued to act in vaudeville until 1916, followed by work on Broadway and off-Broadway stage productions. She was in the cast of Did I Say No? (1931) at the 48th Street Theatre; Good Neighbor (1941) at the Windsor Theatre; All You Need Is One Good Break (1950) at the Mansfield Theatre; Highway Robbery (1955) at the President Theatre; Comic Strip (1958) at the Barbizon-Plaza; and Abie's Irish Rose (1954) at the Holiday Theatre.

She died on November 19, 1963 at the age of 75 of a heart attack at Bellevue Hospital in New York City.

== Filmography ==
- Yizker (1924), silent film directed by Sidney M. Goldin; as Zsusi, Leybke's foster mother
- Broken Hearts (1926), silent film directed by Maurice Schwartz; as Shprintze
- The Heart of New York (1932), directed by Mervyn LeRoy; as Mrs. Zelde Marantz
- Symphony of Six Million (1932), directed by Gregory La Cava; as Hannah Klauber
- Faithless (1932), directed by Harry Beaumont; as Mrs Mandel, second landlady
- Jolly Paupers (1937), directed by Leon Jeannot and Zygmunt Turkow
- Green Fields (1937), directed by Edgar Georg Ulmer; as Rochel
- The Singing Blacksmith (1938), directed by Edgar Georg Ulmer, Ben–Zvi Baratoff, Ossip Dymow; as Chaye-Peshe

=== Television ===
- Lux Video Theatre (1952), television anthology series; as Frau Schmidt
- Goodyear Television Playhouse (1954), television anthology series; as Mama
- Kraft Theatre (1954–1955), television anthology series; as Mom
- Naked City (1958), television police procedural series; as Mrs. Levinsky
