= Fela Garbarz =

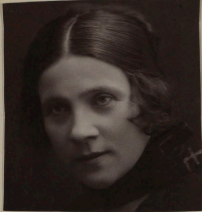
Fela Grabarz, 1925

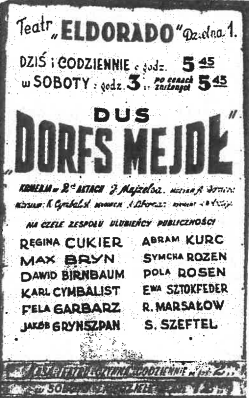
Dorfs Mejdl play poster, Warsaw Ghetto, Eldorado Theatre

Fela Garbarz (Felicja Garbarz, 1913–1943?) was a Polish actress of Jewish origin, member of the Jewish Actors' Trade Union in Poland (Polish: Związek Zawodowy Artystów Żydowskich w Polsce) She is known for her roles in pre-war Jewish films and theater plays in Yiddish. During World War II she was in the Warsaw Ghetto, where she probably died.

== Filmography ==
- 1937: Jolly Paupers
