= Menke Katz =

Russian-American poet and writer

- מעינקע קאַץ
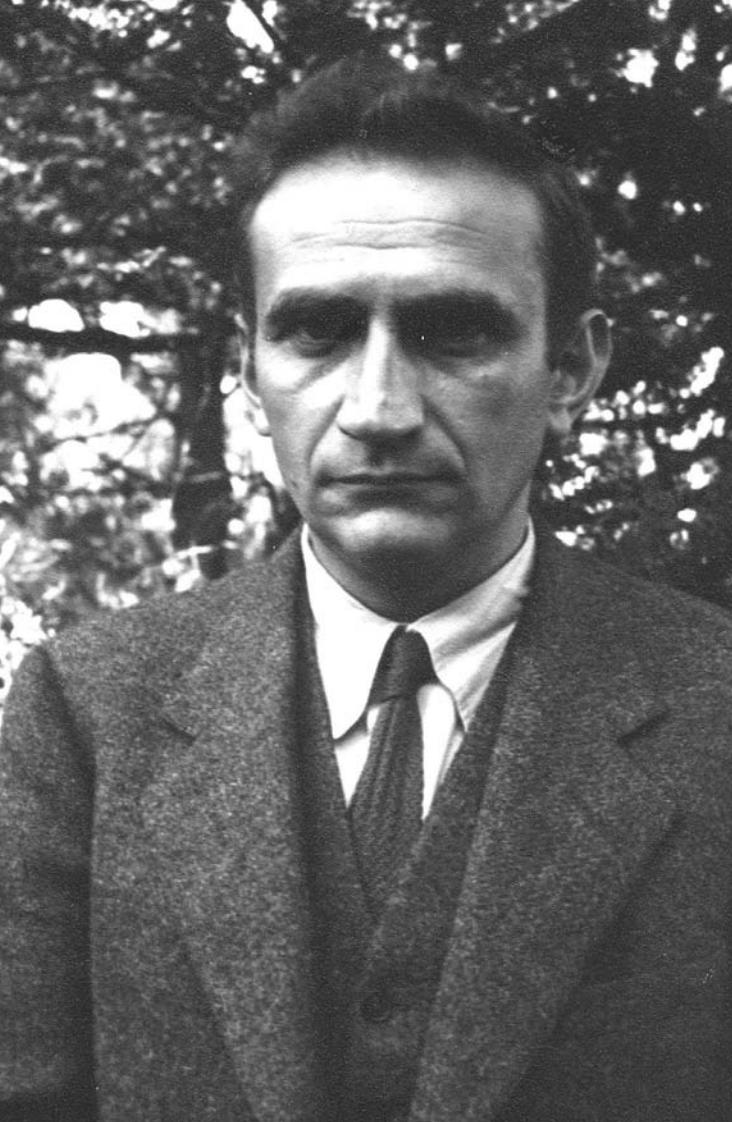
- Menke Katz in 1939
- Born: April 12, 1906; Svintsyan, Vilna Governorate, Russian Empire (now Švenčionys, Lithuania)
- Died: April 24, 1991 (aged 85); Spring Glen, New York, U.S.
- Occupations: Poet, writer
- Children: Dovid Katz, Troim Katz Handler

Menke Katz (Yiddish: מעינקע קאַץ; Yiddish pronunciation: [mɛɪnkə]; April 12, 1906 – April 24, 1991) was an award-winning Yiddish-language and English-language poet and writer of Lithuanian-Jewish descent. He was one of few Yiddish poets based in the United States whose original English poetry also gained prominence. He was an experimentalist of form and an opponent of rhyme, particularly in his English writing. He was the father of Dovid Katz.

== Biography ==
=== Early life ===
On the second night of Passover in 1906, Menke Katz was born in present-day Švenčionys in Lithuania, approximately 50 miles northeast of Vilnius, to father Hirshe-Dovid Katz and mother Badonna Gubersky. In 1914, his father immigrated alone to the United States through Ellis Island. During World War I, his family lived in Micháleshik (now Mikulishki, Belarus). His early poetic inspiration developed while in Micháleshik, influenced by his wartime struggles, the death of his eldest brother, and his near-death visions caused by the Spanish flu. These events provided the impetus for his remaining family to immigrate to New York City in 1920. Soon, his family was reunited with his father in Passaic, New Jersey.

As a teenager, he moved with a cousin to New York City's Lower East Side where he lived and worked for decades.

=== Life and career ===
Katz published his first poem in Spartak, a publication edited by Vladimir Mayakovsky. He later joined the leftist Yiddish writers' group that became Proletpen (Yiddish: פּראָלעטפּען). In 1932, he was expelled from the group for publishing his first book, a poetic drama with erotic themes, titled Dray shvester (Yiddish: דרײַ שװעסטער; "Three sisters"). In 1938, he published his two-volume epic, Brenendik shtetl (Yiddish: ברענענדיק שטעטל; "Burning village"), that featured descriptions of shtetl life and its lack of appreciation for socialist realism. His epic also described the experiences of immigration to New York City. He soon published a manifesto titled Der braver pakhdn (Yiddish: דער בראַװער פּחדן; "The brave coward"), advocating for nonpartisan Yiddish poetry.

Beginning in 1944, he started writing in more universal themes, notably with his book Inmitn tog (Yiddish: אינמיטן טאָג; "Midday") in 1954. It was around this time he began writing in English. In 1956, he published A Patched Window in Commentary. He also began publishing frequently in The Atlantic Monthly, The New York Times, and Poet Lore, alongside some other English publications.

In 1959, he was arrested in Israel for speaking Yiddish to his son in public.

In 1965, he published his first English book titled Land of Manna that spoke to the nature of both American city life and shtetl life.

He founded and was the longtime editor of Bitterroot Quarterly Poetry Magazine which sought unknown talent in poetry.

He published 18 books—9 in Yiddish and 9 in English. His works have been featured in 21 languages, including French, Greek, Hebrew, Italian, Japanese, Kannada, and Lithuanian. In 2005, Benjamin and Barbara Harshav translated his 9 Yiddish books into English in Menke: The Complete Yiddish Poems of Menke Katz.

He also worked as a Yiddish instructor. In 1978, he left New York City with his wife and moved to a mountain cabin in Spring Glen, New York where he lived for the remainder of his life.

=== Awards and nominations ===
In 1965, his book of poetry Land of Manna was nominated for a Pulitzer Prize. In 1970, he won his first Stephen Vincent Benét Narrative Poetry Award, receiving a second in 1974 for his World of Old Abe. His 1972 English work titled Burning Village was nominated for a Pulitzer Prize.

=== Death ===
At his home in Spring Glen, New York, Katz died from a heart attack at the age of 85 in his sleep.

== Works ==
Yiddish:

- Dray shvester (1932, the first of two editions through 1993)
- Der mentsh in togn (Yiddish: דער מענטש אין טאָגן; "Humanity at dawn") (1935)
- Brenendik shtetl (1938)
- S'hot dos vort mayn bobe Moyne (Yiddish: ס'האָט דאָס װאָרט מײַן באָבע מױנע; "Grandmother Mona takes the floor") (1939)
- Tsu dertseyln in freydn (Yiddish: צו דערצײלן אין פֿרײדן; "To tell it in happy times") (1941)
- Der posheter kholem (Yiddish: דער פּשוטער חלום; "The simple dream") (1947)
- Inmitn tog (1954)
- Tsfas (Yiddish: צפֿת; "Safed") (1979)
- Meynke sonetn (Yiddish: מעינקע סאָנעטן; "Menke sonnets") (1993)

English:

- Land of Manna (1965, the first of two editions through 2009)
- Rockrose (1970)
- Burning Village (1972)
- Forever and Ever and a Wednesday (1980)
- Two Friends (with Harry Smith) (1981)
- A Chair for Elijah (1985)
- Two Friends II (with Harry Smith) (1988)
- Nearby Eden (1990)
- This Little Land (1992)
