= Shaul Berezovsky =

Composer, pianist and music director (1908–1975)

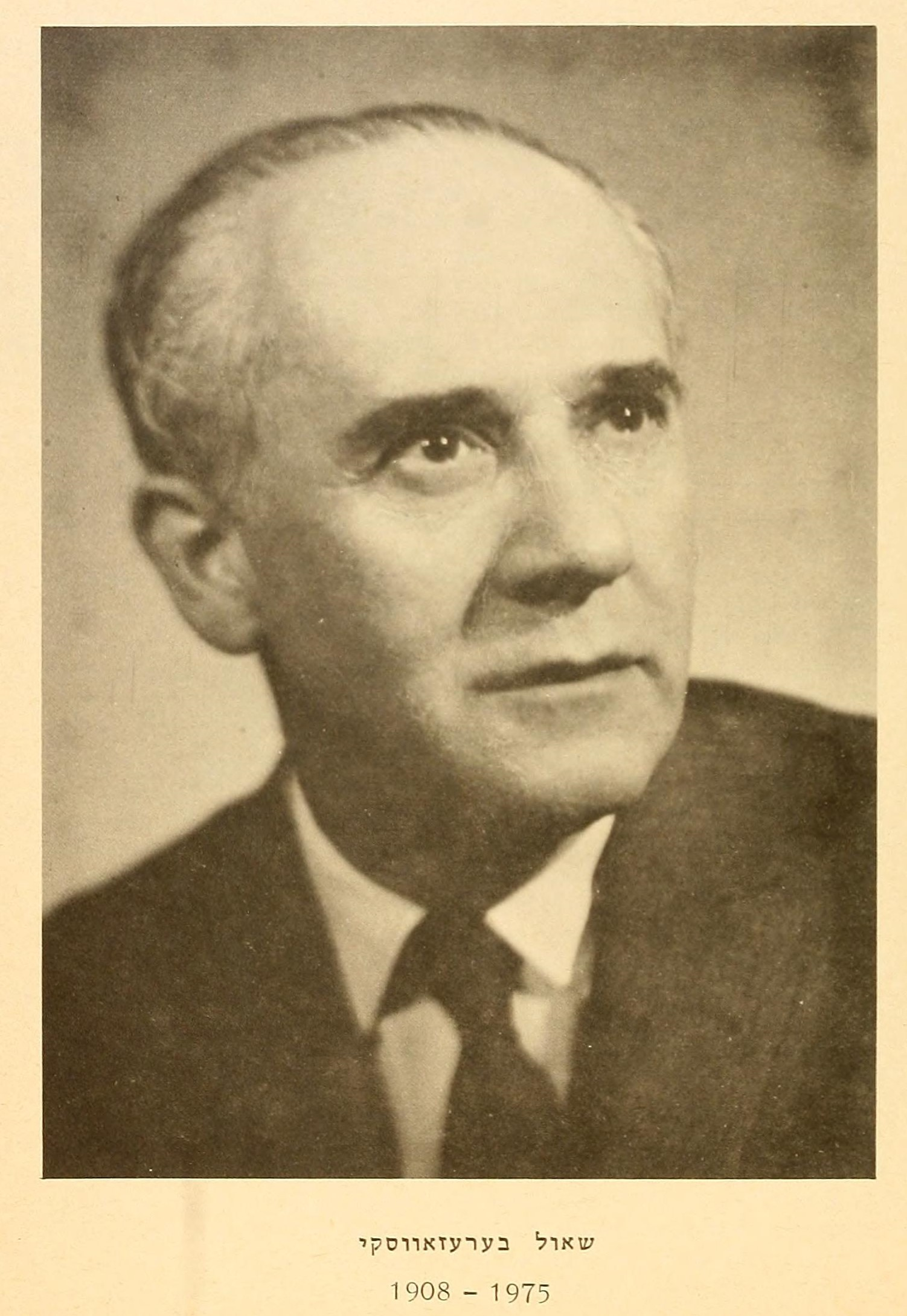
Shaul Berezovsky

Shaul Berezovsky (Yiddish: שאול בערעזאָװסקי, Hebrew: שאול ברזובסקי, Polish: Szaul Berezowski, 1908–1975) was a Polish and Israeli composer, pianist, and music director. He composed music for productions by many of the leading figures of the Polish Yiddish Theatre of the interwar and postwar period, including Shimon Dzigan and Israel Shumacher, Moishe Broderzon, and Ida Kamińska. He was also well known as a choir director and arranger.

== Biography ==
=== Early life ===
Berezovsky was born in Grodno, Grodno Governorate, Russian Empire (today located in Belarus) on 5 June 1908. He was born into a family of musicians; his grandfather was a Hazzan in Skidzyelʹ (a town near Grodno) and his father, Shraga-Fayvl Berezovsky, was a well known choir director and music teacher in Grodno. One of his earliest musical instructors was his own father, and after briefly studying the violin he was sent in 1916 to a local piano teacher in Grodno named Lilia Fidelman. Shaul's older brother Lyolye also became a pianist, studying at the Leipzig Conservatory and later becoming an instructor in Greece and then Israel. From 1926 to 1929 Shaul studied at the Warsaw Conservatory in Warsaw.

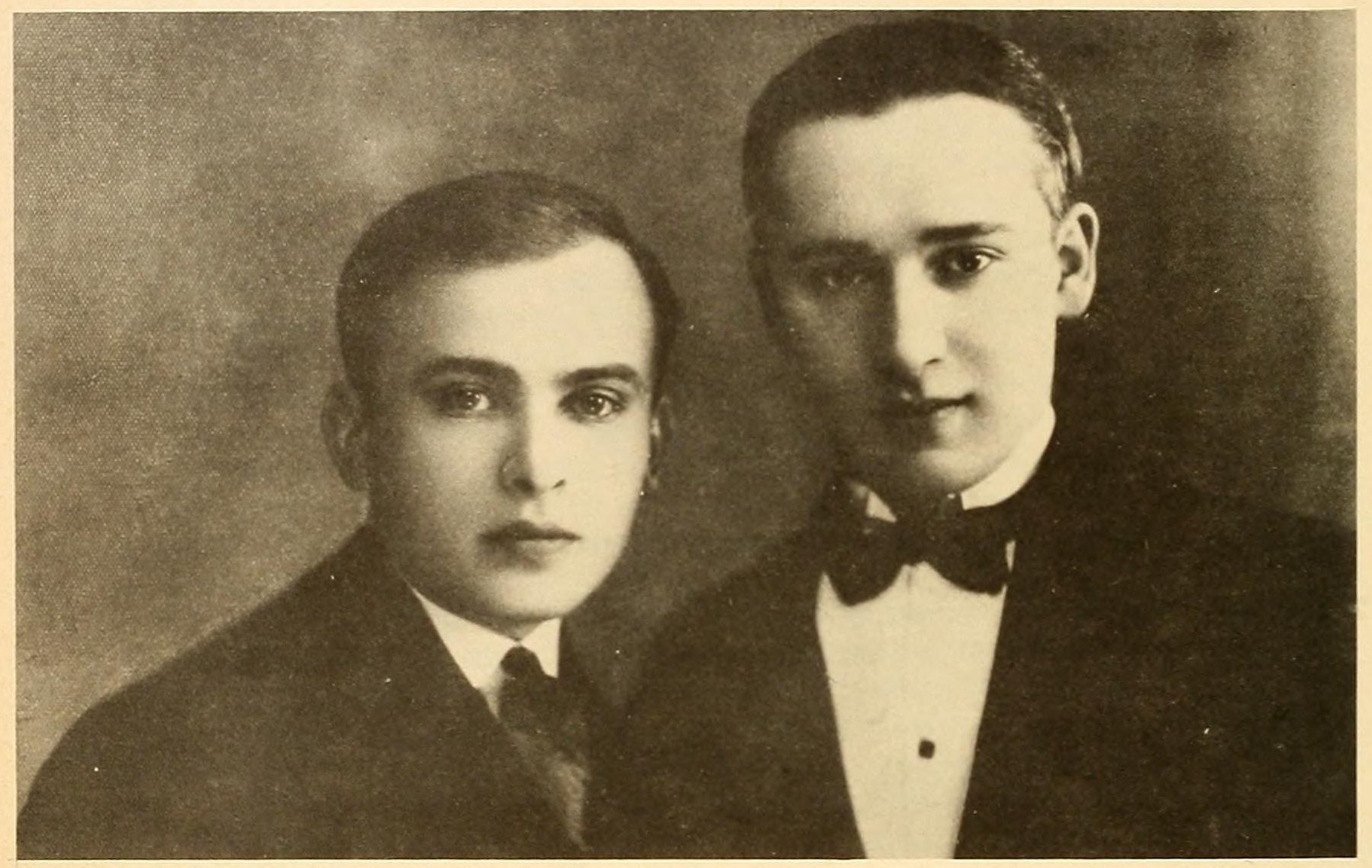
Shaul Berezovsky (left) and friend Stanislavsky, late 1920s

=== Music career ===
After finishing his schooling, he relocated to Białystok, where he began to work as a Yiddish theatre accompanist, directed the orchestra at the Apollo, and had a jazz band in the military. He also started to write music for theatre troupes such as Ararat. However, when his mother fell ill, he returned to Grodno and became a pianist in a silent film theatre for a time. During this time he also toured with Yiddish theater companies, directing the orchestras or as a piano accompanist. Berezovsky's younger brother Israel was killed in a Pogrom in Grodno in July 1935; he was 21 years old at the time. As the war approached, Shaul was drafted into the Polish army, being stationed in the 42nd infantry based in Białystok. During that time he organized an army string ensemble, and was also permitted leave at night to supplement his income by playing in ensembles in cafes.

He remained in Białystok after the Soviet invasion of Poland, and the city soon saw an influx of Yiddish theatre figures fleeing the German invasion of other Polish cities. Among them were Shimon Dzigan and Israel Shumacher, who became regular collaborators with Berezovsky. They performed in the Soviet Union during the war in a state-supported troupe called the Byalistoker melukhisher yidisher minyatur-teater, directed by Moishe Broderzon; of course, the troupe had to adhere to Soviet censorship standards and could not criticize the regime in their comedy skits. The troupe managed to stage two full shows in 1940: Zingendik un tantsndik (Singing and Dancing) and Rozhinkes mit mandlen (Raisins and Almonds). The troupe was in Odessa at the moment of the German invasion of the Soviet Union in 1941. The troupe fled first to Kharkiv and then to Central Asia; Dzigan and Shumacher fell afoul of Soviet authorities and were arrested, and the ensemble fell apart. After that Berezovsky became accompanist and arranger for the actor Anna Guzik, a position he held until the end of the war. During this period he also married his wife Regina (née Goldberg).

After World War II, many Polish Jews were repatriated from the Soviet Union to Poland, and after a brief time in Krawkow, Berezovsky and his wife settled in Łódź. At first he made his living playing in cafes, but he soon became an important figure in the revival of Jewish culture there in the city, which was rapidly becoming the centre of postwar Jewish life in Poland. A Yiddish Theatre with state support was founded under the direction of Ida Kamińska, who had recently returned from the Soviet Union as well; Berezovsky composed for it, in addition to running a folk choir and composing for films. He also directed the Russian-language Kalinka choir. Dzigan and Shumacher were also permitted to leave the Soviet Union and they returned to Poland and began to collaborate with Berezovsky again. During the following years Berezovsky was especially known for his ambitious and successful choral productions.

In 1950, he appealed to Polish authorities to emigrate to Israel, but it was denied. He was only permitted to do so in 1957 where he continued to work in Yiddish and Hebrew theater. He wrote music for theater and cinema (including the play and film adaptation of Abraham Goldfaden's di Tsvey kuni Leml (The Two Kuni Lemls) with Mike Burstyn, 1963), worked with Dzigan and Shumacher again, and conducted various orchestras.

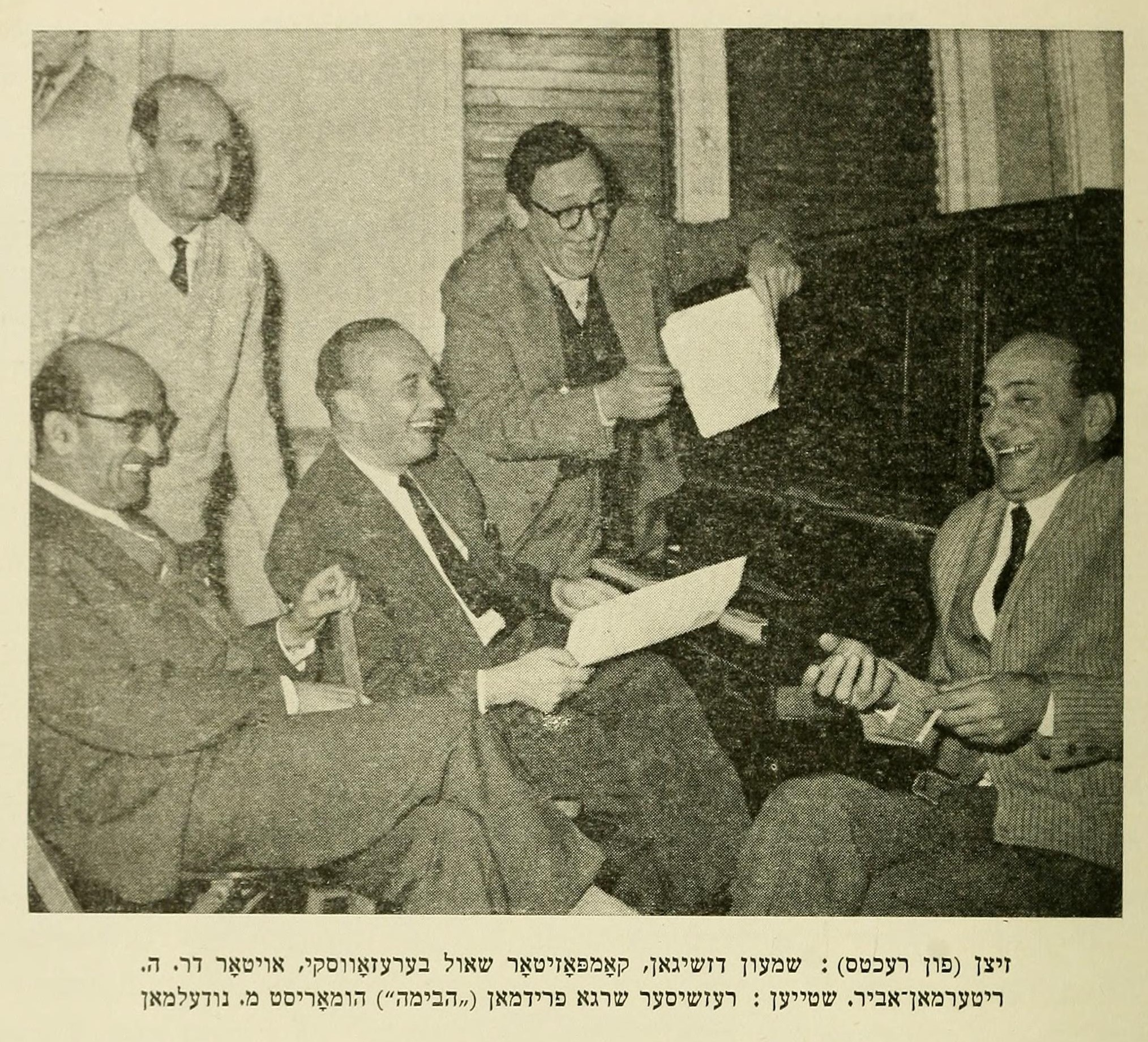
Shaul Berezovsky, Shimon Dzigan and other Yiddish theatre figures

He died on 2 April 1975 in Tel Aviv. Shortly after his death an anthology of his choral arrangements was published under the title Lider-bukh (Songbook).

A number of his compositions are still performed today. These include Unter di khurves fun Poyln (under the ruins of Poland, an adaptation of an Itzik Manger poem), Ikh bin mid (I am tired, also a Manger poem), In geto (adapted from a Mordechai Gebirtig poem), Dem Zeydns Nign (Grandfather's tune), and Baym Taykh (By the river, adaptation of a Mani Leib poem).
