= Shimon Redlich =

Israeli historian and Holocaust survivor (born 1935)

- שמעון רדליך
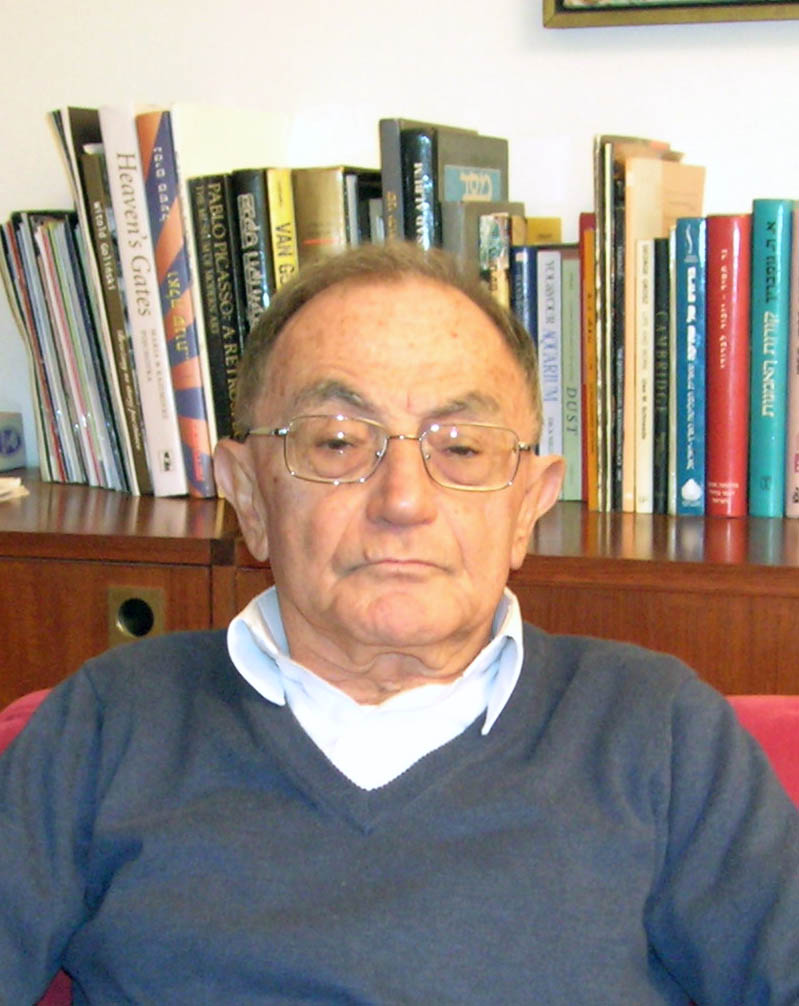
- Portrait of Redlich, 2007
- Born: 1935 (age 90–91); Lwów, Lwów Voivodeship, Second Polish Republic
- Occupation: Academic
- Title: Professor emeritus
- Spouse: Yehudit
- Father: Shlomo
- Awards: Order of Merit

Academic background
- Education: NYU

Academic work
- Discipline: History
- Sub-discipline: Modern history
- Institutions: BGU
- Main interests: Jewish history in Eastern Europe
- Military service
- Allegiance: Israel
- Branch: Israel Defense Forces
- Service years: 1954–1956

Shimon Redlich (Hebrew: שמעון רדליך; born 1935) is an Israeli historian and Holocaust survivor, professor emeritus at the Ben Gurion University, a specialist in the modern history of Jews in Eastern Europe, Russia and the USSR.

== Biography ==
Redlich was born in Lviv in 1935. He and his family moved to Brzezany, located in what is now Ukraine, the same year. In 1943 his father was killed during a round-up, and the family went into hiding with the help of a Polish and a Ukrainian families.

Redlich is one of the child survivors starring in the 1946 film Unzere kinder.

In 1950 he emigrated to Israel. He earned BA at Hebrew University, MA from Harvard University and PhD from New York University. In 1972 he began teaching at Ben Gurion University and retired as full professor in 2003.

== Works ==
=== Monographies ===
- Redlich, Shimon (1982). Propaganda and Nationalism in Wartime Russia: the Jewish Antifascist Committee in the USSR, 1941-1948. East European Monographs. Vol. 108. East European Monographs.
- Redlich, Shimon, ed. (1995). "Contents and Introduction" (PDF). War, Holocaust and Stalinism: A Documented Study of the Jewish Anti-Fascist Committee in the USSR. Psychology Press. ISBN 978-3-7186-5739-1.
- Redlich, Shimon (2002). Together and Apart in Brzezany: Poles, Jews, and Ukrainians, 1919-1945. Indiana University Press. ISBN 978-0-253-34074-0.
- Redlich, Shimon (2011). Life in transit: Jews in postwar Lodz, 1945-1950. Academic Studies Press. ISBN 978-965-536-085-1.
- Redlich, Shimon (2018). "Table of Contents and Preface" (PDF). A New Life in Israel: 1950-1954. Academic Studies Press. ISBN 978-1-61811-715-1.

=== Essays ===
- Redlich, Shimon (1971). "The Jews in the Soviet Annexed Territories 1939-41". Soviet Jewish Affairs. 1 (1): 81–90. doi:10.1080/13501677108577082.
- Redlich, Shimon (1971). "Jews in General Anders' Army in the Soviet Union 1941-42". Soviet Jewish Affairs. 1 (2): 90–98. doi:10.1080/13501677108577099.
- Redlich, Shimon (1974). "Jewish Appeals in the USSR: An Expression of National Revival". Soviet Jewish Affairs. 4 (2): 24–37. doi:10.1080/13501677408577192.
- Redlich, Shimon (1977). "Soviet uses of jewish nationalism during world war II: The membership and dynamics of the jewish antifascist committee in the USSR". Nationalities Papers. 5 (2): 136–166. doi:10.1080/00905997708407812.Redlich, Shimon (1979). "The Erlich-Alter Affair". Soviet Jewish Affairs. 9 (2): 24–45. doi:10.1080/13501677908577310.
- Redlich, Shimon (1989). "The Jews in the Soviet Annexed Territories 1939-41". In Marrus, M. R. (ed.). The Nazi Holocaust - Historical Articles on the Destruction of European Jews: Bystanders to the Holocaust. Berlin: de Gryter. pp. 1009–1020. doi:10.1515/9783110968682.1009. ISBN 978-3-598-21564-3.
- Redlich, Shimon (1990). "Metropolitan andrei sheptyts'kyi, Ukrainians and jews during and after the holocaust". Holocaust and Genocide Studies. 5 (1): 39–51. doi:10.1093/hgs/5.1.39.
- Redlich, Shimon (1992). "Discovering Soviet Archives: The Papers of the Jewish Anti-Fascist Committee". Jewish Quarterly Review. 39 (4): 15–19. doi:10.1080/0449010X.1992.10705883 (inactive 26 September 2025).
