= Gershon Winkler =

20th and 21st century Danish rabbi

Gershon Winkler is a Danish, non-denominational rabbi, scholar, teacher and author whose special interest is indigenous Judaism.

== Early life ==
Gershon Winkler was born in Denmark in 1949, where his grandfather and grandmother, Rabbi Michael Shalom Winkler and Esther Winkler, served as the spiritual leaders of the Haredi community of Machzikei Hadas. He was ordained as a rabbi in 1978 by the late Musar Master Rabbi Eliezer Benzion Bruk, Founder and Dean of Yeshivat Bais Yosef Novhordok (Russia) in Jerusalem. He has devoted most of his life to teaching and writing about the lesser promulgated ancient Hebraic and Aramaic mystery wisdom and is a pioneer in the restoration of the shamanic traditions of ancient Israel. He has also devoted much of his life to visiting state and federal prison camps, mostly across Colorado and West Virginia, and currently serves as the Jewish chaplain for a forensic state hospital in Southern California. In 1997, he founded the Walking Stick Foundation, an educational entity dedicated to the restoration of what he calls "Aboriginal Judaism," conducting retreats and seminars as well as special "Jewish Shamanic" tours across the Land of Israel. Author of fourteen books on Jewish law, lore, history and mystery, Rabbi Winkler also holds a doctorate in Jewish Theology and is known as much for his humor as he is for his erudite scholarship. He is also a Vietnam-War era Veteran, having served in the U.S. Army from 1967 to 1970 as a chaplain's assistant and as an infantryman with fourteen months of overseas duty in South Korea.

== Career ==
Winkler is a scholar in the fields of Jewish law, lore, history, theology, and mysticism.

He has received media recognition, including a front-page feature in The Wall Street Journal, a segment on the PBS series Religion and Ethics Newsweekly, and detailed coverage in Israel’s Ha’aretz, Chayyim Acherim Magazine, and The Jerusalem Post.

He has also served as spiritual teacher and life-cycle facilitator for Jewish communities across New Mexico, Colorado, West Virginia and Montana, including 8 years as rabbi of Congregation Har Shalom in Missoula, Montana, prior to its affiliation with the Reform Movement. and served full-time as a chaplain for California's Department of State Hospitals in a Forensic Mental Health facility.

In 1997, he founded the Walkingstick Foundation, a nonprofit organization dedicated to the recovery and preservation of indigenous Jewish spirituality.

== Other ==
Gershon Winkler is author of more than 14 books, most notably:

- The Invitation: Living a Meaningful Death (Ashina) with co-author Rabbi Dr. Miriam Maron
- Daily Kabbalah: Wisdom from the Tree of Life (North Atlantic Books),
- Sacred Secrets: The Sanctity of Sex in Jewish Law and Lore (Jason Aronson)
- The Soul of the Matter: A Jewish-Kabbalistic Perspective on the Human Soul Before, During, and After Life (Judaica Press)
- Travels with the Evil Inclination: A Rabble-rousing Renegade Rabbi's Story (North Atlantic Books)
- The Judeo-Christian Fiction (self-published Lulu.com)
- The Golem of Prague: A New Adaptation of the Documented Stories of the Golem of Prague (Judaica Press)
- Secret of Sambatyon (Judaica Youth Series, Judaica Press)
- Cabala 365/ Kabbalah 365: Un Fruto Del Arbol De La Vida Para Cada Dia (Daily Fruit from the Tree of Life) (Spanish Edition) (Norma SA Editorial)
- The Sacred Stones: The Return of the Golem (Judaica Press)
- Magic of the Ordinary: Recovering the Shamanic in Judaism (North Atlantic Books)
- They Called Her Rebbe: The Maiden of Ludomir (Israel Book Shop)
