= Proletpen =

Organization of US Yiddish-language writers

Proletpen (Yiddish: פּראָלעטפּען) was an organization of Yiddish language writers in the New York City, United States. Proletpen was founded on September 13, 1929 as a continuation of the Frayhayt Writers Association (which had suffered mass resignations after the newspaper Frayhayt denounced the role of Zionists in the 1929 Palestine riots). The name 'Proletpen', a Russian-style Yiddish concoction of proletarische pen ('Proletarian pen'), was projected as an antonym of the Yiddish PEN Club. The group was affiliated with the Moscow-based International Union of Revolutionary Writers. Proletpen predated the John Reed Clubs, a grouping of American English-language progressive writers, by a month.

Proletpen poets dealt with social issues, poverty and racism. Proletpen poets included Aaron Kurtz, Yuri Suhl, Martin Birnboim, Yosl Greenshpan, L. Miller, David Seltzer, Leyb Dinski, Ber Green (A. Prince), B. Fenster, B. Friedman, Isaac E. Rontch, Menke Katz and Moishe Shifris. Prose writers associated with Proletpen included Leon Yurman, Chaver Paver, L. Chanukoff, Leib Sobrin, Chaim Margoles-Davidson, David Kasher and S. Deiksel.

The leader of Proletpen was Alexander Pomerantz. Pomerantz spent 1933-1935 in Kyiv, and whilst in the Soviet Union he wrote a thesis in literary history on the Proletpen movement (Proletpén. Etyudn un materyaln tsu der geshikhte fun dem kamf far proletarisher literatur in Amerike).

Proletpen was disbanded in 1938, and replaced by the Yidisher Kultur Farband.
