= Yiddish PEN Club =

Yiddish PEN Club (ייִדישער פּען קלוב yidisher pen klub) was founded in 1927, with two branches in Poland, namely, in the capital of Warsaw and in Wilno (Vilnius, today in Lithuania), alongside the third branch in New York City. This PEN Club grew out from the Association of Jewish Writers and Journalists in Warsaw (פארײן פון יידישע ליטעראטן און זשורנאליסטן fareyn fun eydishe literatn aun zhurnalistn, 1916–1939).

PEN International did not foresee separate clubs for writers creating literature in languages that are not official in a state. Furthermore, the regulations did not allow for another PEN club in the same city. However, the American PEN Club was already based in New York and the Polish PEN Club in Warsaw. Hence, it was decided to make Wilno into the main headquarters of the nascent Yiddish PEN Club. Yet, after the first President Moyshe Kulbak's departure for the Soviet Union in 1928, Warsaw became the Yiddish PEN Center's effective headquarters.

In September 1939, Germany and the Soviet Union jointly attacked Poland and partitioned the country. As a result, the Warsaw branch of the Yiddish PEN Club was extinguished. Moscow passed Wilno and its vicinity to Lithuania, where the city was made into the country's capital of Vilnius. The subsequent Soviet occupation of Lithuania, in 1940, extinguished the Vilnius branch of the Yiddish PEN Club. The effort by Yiddish writers to revive this branch in London failed.

In the wake of World War II and the Holocaust that wiped out the Yiddish speech community (or Central Europe's Yiddishland), the Sovietization of Poland ended the brief revival of the Warsaw branch (1945–1948). Afterward, only the New York branch of the Yiddish PEN Club continued to function until, as part of the Congress for Jewish Culture, it went dormant during the first decade of the 21st century.

The Yiddish PEN Club's last organizational effort was the literary monthly די פּען di pen (The [Yiddish] Pen), published in 1994–1998 by the Alden Press in Oxford.

== Yiddish PEN Chairpersons ==
- Honorary President (1932–1957) Sholem Ash
- Warsaw Branch
  - 1930-1936 Arn Zeitlin
  - 1936-1939 Yehiel Yeshaya Trunk
  - 1946-1948 Rokhl Korn
- Wilno (Vilnius) Branch
  - 1927-1928 Moyshe Kulbak
- New York Branch
  - 1927-1946 David Pinski
  - 1946-1948 Halper(n) Leivick
  - 1948-1954 Froym Oyerbakh (Ephraim Auerbach)
  - 1956-1959 Shloyme Bikl
  - 1960s Aaron Glanz-Leyeles
  - 1960s Leon Feinberg
  - 1970s Samuel L. Shneiderman
  - 1970s/1980s Julian (Yehiel) Hirszhaut
  - 1990s/2000s Yonia Fain

== See also ==
- Proletpen
