= Jolly Paupers =

1937 film by Leon Jeannot

Jolly Paupers (original title in Yiddish: פריילעכע קבצנים, romanized: Di freylekhe kabtsonim; title in Polish: Weseli biedacy) is a 1937 Yiddish-language black and white comedy film shot in Interwar Poland by Kinor film company in 1937. It was directed by Léon Jeannot and Zygmunt Turkow and starred the popular Polish comic duo Shimon Dzigan and Israel Shumacher. The film was a satire on the life and culture of shtetl.

The film was restored in 1985, with English captions added.

== Plot summary ==
Shumacher and Dzigan play a pair of optimistic schlemiels, watchmaker Naftali and tailor Kopl from a shtetl, who find a depression soaked with spilled kerosene and think they struck oil. They start making great plans and tell their wives about their find under the pledge of the great secret. Next day the whole shtetl knows this, and a comedy of errors begins. Everybody wants to join the enterprise, including a local millionaire and an American tourist.

== Title ==
"Happy beggars" used to be a reference to Jewish people who did not try enough to escape poverty (cf.Luftmentsh) and "preferred walking and hanging around rather than working".

The following is an excerpt from the memoirs of Rabbi Reuven Agushevits:

The night before a wedding there was a custom to make a dinner for the poor [di oreme vetshere] – a dinner which was certainly no worse, and sometimes even better, than the dinner for the families and their guests. Don’t forget that with this dinner the idea was not to make an impression on [oystsufaynen] anybody, but to succeed with the Master of the Universe, upon Whose will the entire happiness of the young couple depends. Aside from this dinner, generous donations were set aside for the poor. At the dinner, poor people from the surrounding shtetls convened, among whom one could find usually also comic talents, merry beggars [freylikhe kabtsonim], who wanted to show off their stuff and thus regaled the entire crowd [oylem].

== Cast ==
- Shimon Dzigan, as Kopl, the tailor
- Israel Shumacher, Naftali, the watch mechanic
- Menashe Oppenheim, as "actor"
- Jenna Lovitch (or Jennie), as Gitele, Naftali's daughter
- Fela Garbarz as Feyge Mirl, wife of Kopl
- Ruth Turkov as Itke, daughter of Kopl
- Anna Appel
- Chana Levin as Gitele, mother of Naftali
- Szmulik Goldsztejn as matchmaker
