= Der Jude =

Ashkenazi cultural newspaper

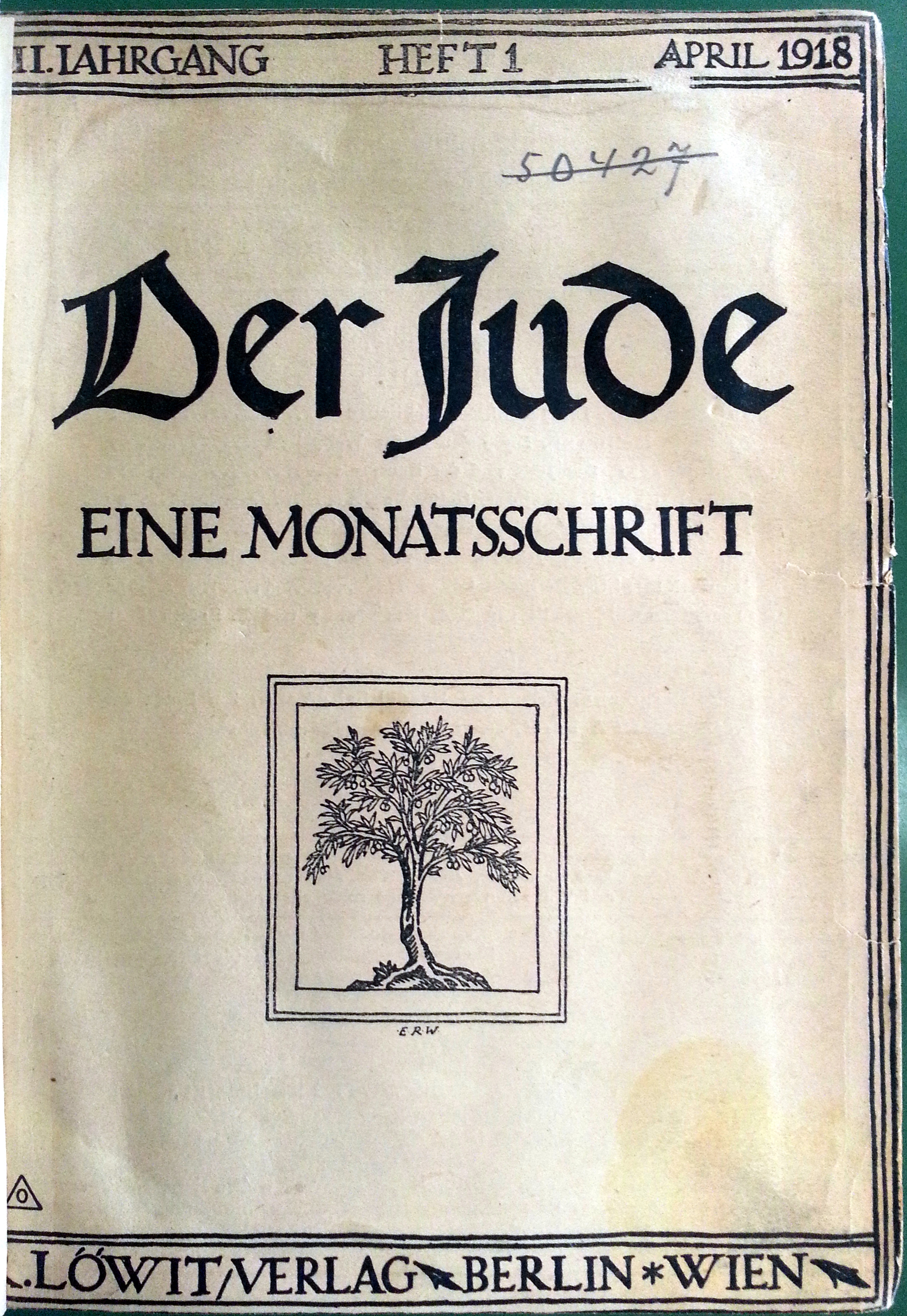
- Cover of the magazine, April 1918
- Former editors: Max Mayer, Max Mayer Präger, Gustav Krojanker, Ernst Simon, and Siegmund Kaznelson
- Frequency: Monthly
- Circulation: 3000–5000
- Publisher: Buber
- Founder: Martin Buber and Salman Schocken
- Founded: 1916
- Final issue: 1928
- Country: Germany
- Language: German

Der Jude ('The Jew') was a monthly magazine in German founded by Martin Buber and Salman Schocken. It was published from 1916 to 1928.

== History ==
The paper was established by Martin Buber. Contributors included Max Mayer, Max Mayer Präger, Gustav Krojanker, Ernst Simon, Siegmund Kaznelson, and dramatist Michał Weichert. It appeared monthly in 1916–1928, published by R. Löwit Verlag (Berlin/Vienna), with circulation in 3000–5000. The final two years saw more irregular publication.

Thus was the third magazine bearing the title. Gottfried Selig had published a different magazine from 1768 to 1772, and Gabriel Riesser edited a magazine of the same name from 1832. A fourth magazine of this name was published weekly in New York from 1895 in German.

Buber announced plans for a magazine by this name in 1903-1904, subtitled "Revue der jüdischen Moderne" (Review of Modern Judaism), which he hoped to put out together with Chaim Weizmann, Berthold Feiwel, Ephraim Moses Lilien, and Davis Trietsch under the auspices of Jüdischer Verlag. A prospectus, composed by Buber, was printed and distributed, but for financial reasons the plans for publication fell through.
