= Moishe Broderzon =

Yiddish poet and theater director (1890–1956)

- משה בראָדערזאָן
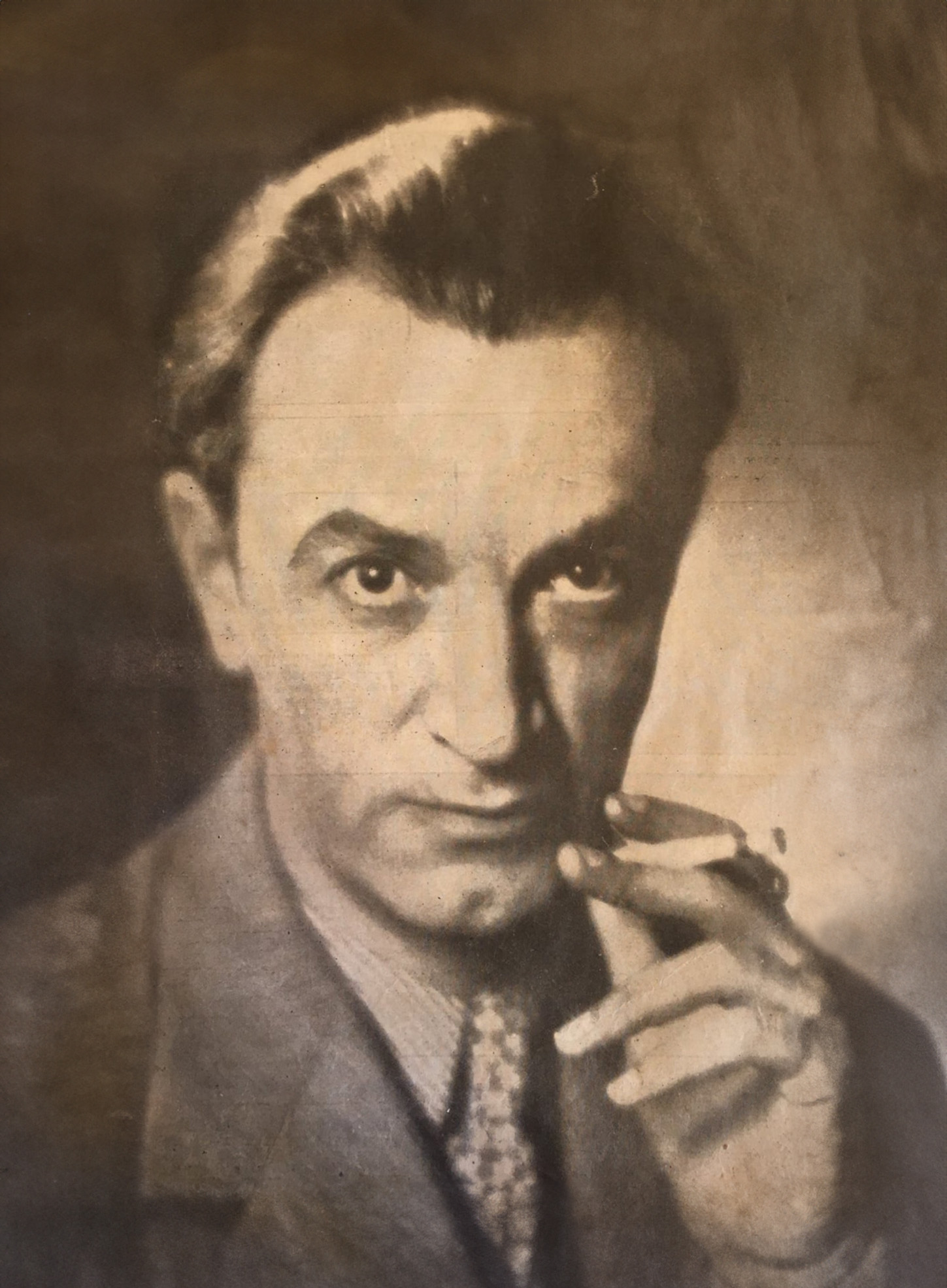
- Broderzon in 1938
- Born: 23 November 1890; Moscow, Moscow Governorate, Russian Empire
- Died: 17 August 1956 (aged 65); Warsaw, Polish People's Republic
- Burial place: Jewish Cemetery, Warsaw
- Occupations: Poet; theatre director; artist
- Years active: 1913–1939
- Known for: Yung-yidish
- Movement: Avant-garde; Expressionism; modernism

Moishe Broderzon (Yiddish: משה בראָדערזאָן; 23 November [O.S. 11 November] 1890 – 17 August 1956) was a Yiddish poet, theatre director, and the founder of the Łódź literary group Yung-yidish.

== Personal life ==
He was born 1890 in Moscow, but his family was among the Jews expelled in 1891. His father moved to Łódź; his mother took her children to her father's home in Nesvizh (now in Belarus). In 1900, the family was reunited in Łódź.

He became a bookkeeper and began writing short narratives in the Yiddish press in Łódź. In 1914 he issued a collection of his poems called Shvartse fliterlekh (Black Spangles). He was a founder of Yung-Yidish artists collaborative.

[Broderson's] extravagant appearance quickly made an impression on the Yiddish cultural circles organized around the tutelary figure of the Yiddish and Hebrew writer Yitschak Katzenelson. Broderzon had long, thick black hair, Pushkin-style sideburns, and a black shirt characteristic of a Russian worker. He was the only poet in Łódź to wear amber and coral necklaces, and rings on his fingers..

— Gilles Rozier, YIVO Encyclopedia, Moyshe Broderzon article

When the Germans invaded Łódź, Broderson moved to Moscow and began publishing his poetry in the Yiddish press. With friends he established the Krayzl fun Yidish Natsyonaler Estetik (Circle for Jewish National Aesthetic). In 1918 he founded (with El Lissitzky, and writers Daniel Tsharni, Gershon Broyde, and Menashe Halpern) the Moscow Circle of Jewish Writers and Artists.

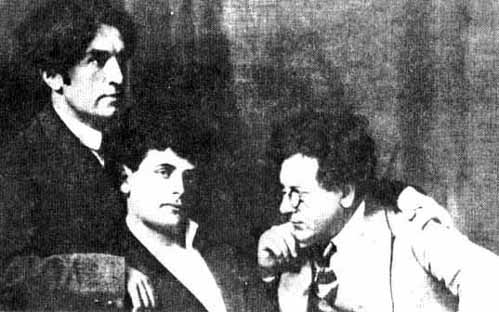
Moyshe Broderzon, Peretz Markish and Alter Kacyzne (left to right)

In 1918, at the age of 28, Broderzon returned to Łódź. He was a founder of the literary group Yung-yidish, which published a journal of the same name. The journal featured poetry, prose, and experimental art. His wife, Sheyne-Miryam, was an actress famed for a chasidic dance routine.

Broderzon also founded several theatres in Łódź: In 1922, with Yekhezkl-Moyshe Nayman, Yitschok Broyner, and Henech Kon he created the Yiddish Marionette Theater Khad Gadyo (Chad-gadye, Khad-gadye), and Shor habor, a variety theater. In 1924 he and Henekh Kon wrote the music for the first Yiddish opera performed in Warsaw, Dovid un Basheve (David and Bathseba), performed in Warsaw's Kaminski Theater; he also wrote a libretto for the opera Monish based on I. L. Peretz's epic romantic poem. In 1926 he began writing for the Azazel theater cafe in Warsaw. In 1927 he was one of the founders of the kleynkunst stage Ararat in Łódź, an experimental theater that featured the actors Shimon Dzigan and Israel Shumacher. He often wrote articles about Yiddish theater.

His final lyrics, which appeared in 1939 with the single letter Yud as title, comprise 50 poems of 16 lines each, laden with tragic premonitions of the end of Polish Jewry in a coming world catastrophe.

— Nanette Stahl, Judaica Collection, Yale University

He and his wife, Sheyne Miriam, escaped from Poland to the Soviet Union in 1939 after the Nazi invasion. They worked in the Yiddish theatre in Moscow and became Soviet citizens. He was arrested in April 1950, sentenced to ten years in prison, and sent to Siberia. After five years in a labor camp he was "rehabilitated" in September 1955 and was allowed to return to Poland in July 1956. There he was greeted by a small number of literati who had reunited after the war. He died of a heart attack in Warsaw on 17 August 1956. Moshe Broderson was buried in the Jewish cemetery at Okopowa Street in Warsaw. After the devastation of the grave, his daughter Anetta (born 1920) transported her father's ashes to Israel to the Kiryat Sha'ul cemetery in Tel Aviv. Posthumously, his texts were used in performances of the Jewish Theatre in Warsaw: Sure Szejndl from 1966 and The Great Win from 1972 and 1985.
