= Dzigan and Schumacher =

Polish-Jewish Yiddish comedy duo

Dzigan and Schumacher were a Polish Jewish comedy duo who worked primarily in Yiddish. Dzigan and Schumacher performed on stage for thirty years, countless times in Poland, later Israel, and across the globe, in many films and stage shows.

== Biographies ==
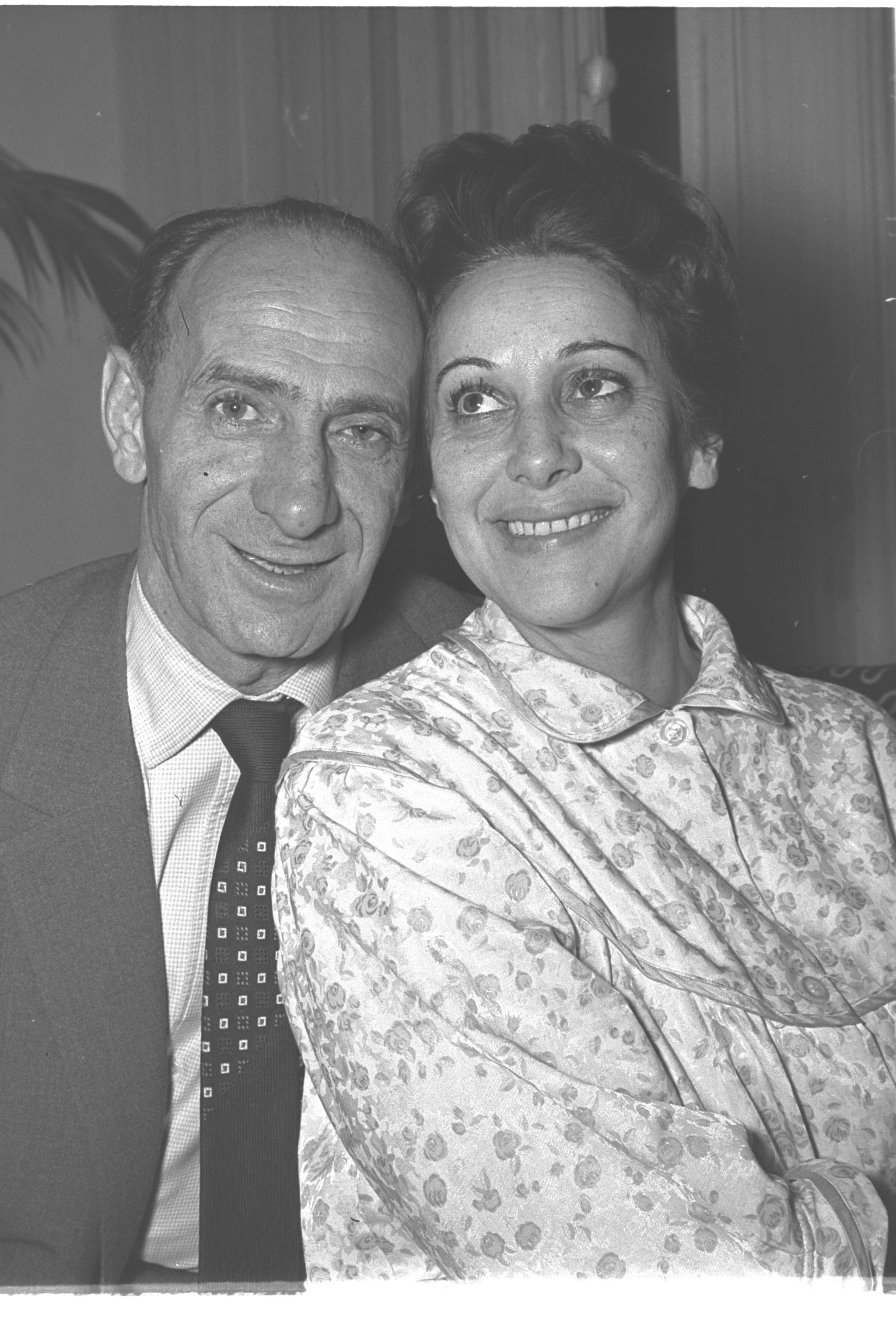
Shimon Dzigan and his wife Eva

Shimon Dzigan (Note: Yiddish: שמעון דזשיגאן, Polish: Szymon Dzigan) (1905 – April 14, 1980) and Israel Schumacher (Note: also spelled Shumacher) (1908 – May 21, 1961) were both born in Łódź. Dzigan's father was a soldier in the Imperial Russian Army. After the outbreak of World War I, Dzigan was apprenticed to a tailor to help the family make ends meet. Schumacher went to a Hebrew school.

== Career ==
Moishe Broderzon was impressed by Dzigan's improvised parodies in 1927, and invited him to join the Ararat literary kleynkunst (cabaret) theater that he was forming in Łódź with his friends. Dzigan met Schumacher there and they teamed up to form what would become the most famous Yiddish comic duo, "Dzigan and Schumacher". They first performed at Ararat before moving on to the Yidishe Bande. They founded their own cabaret company in 1935 at the Nowości Theater in Warsaw.

When Germany invaded Poland, they fled to Soviet-occupied Białystok, where they pulled their company back together and toured Minsk, Moscow, Leningrad, Kyiv, Kharkov, and other Soviet cities. Shaul Berezovsky composed music for their troupe during this period.

== Post war ==
Dzigan and Schumacher attempted to leave the Soviet Union with the Polish general Władysław Anders, but were arrested and spent four years in gulags. First in Tashkent and then in Oktyabrsky. They were permitted to perform, for Jews and the NKVD. They were released in 1946, rearrested in Lwów, and finally escaped to Warsaw in 1947. The duo played themselves in the Yiddish language Polish film, Unzere kinder, the first (semi-)documentary about the Holocaust in Poland.

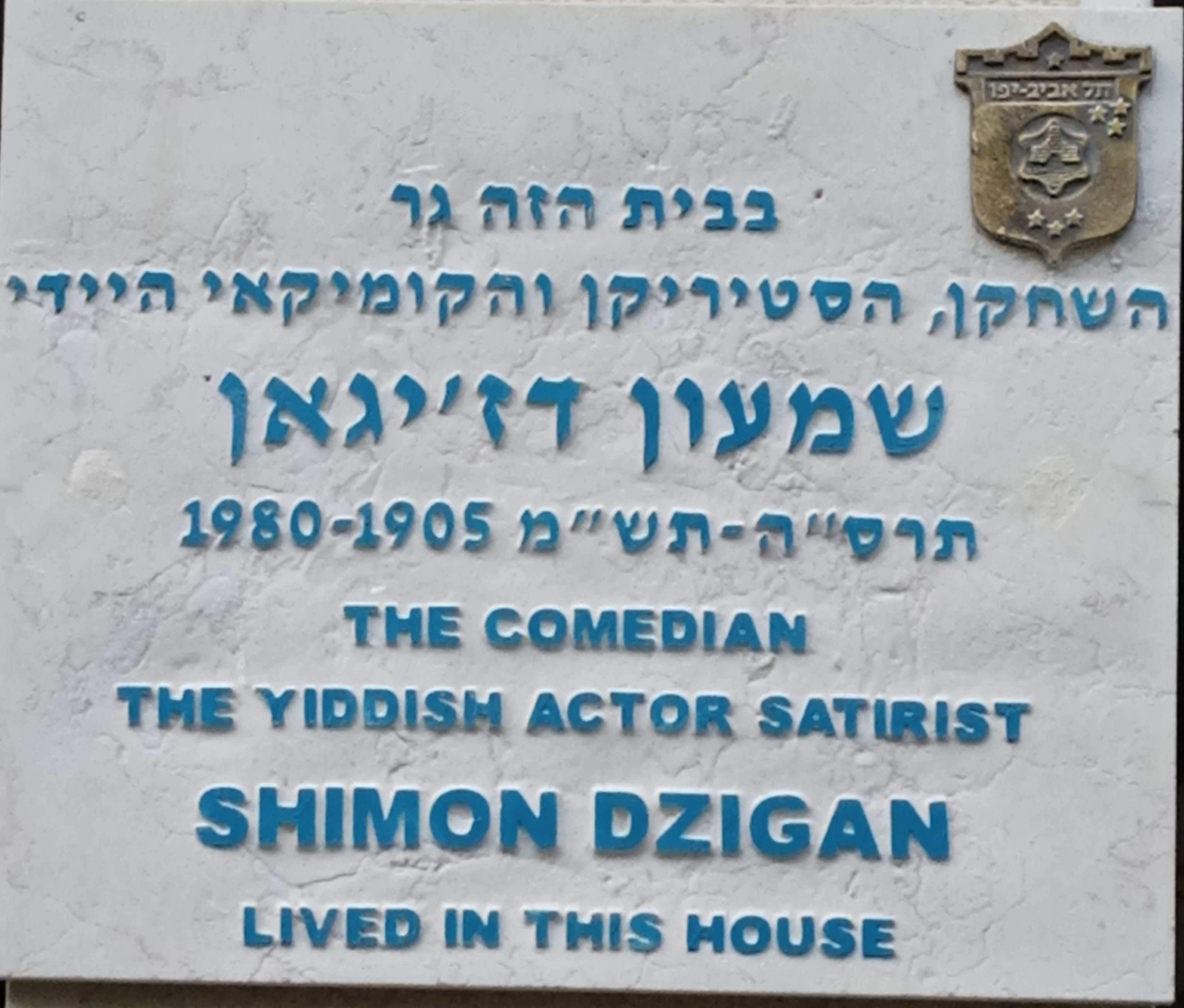
Shimon Dzigan memorial plaque in Tel Aviv

They emigrated to Israel in 1950 to rebuild their careers and faced anti-Yiddish sentiment, but managed to attract an audience and toured the world. They replaced Polish characters with Israeli ones. They managed their own theater in Buenos Aires from 1951 to 1952, before finally establishing their own in Tel Aviv in 1958. They broke up two years later. Schumacher died on May 21, 1961, and Dzigan went on performing solo until he died in Tel Aviv on April 14, 1980.

== Legacy ==
Their works were made into a historic Yiddish-language television program, broadcast in Israel in the 1970s, where they presented their own brand of humor. The duo's TV and live performance was Yiddish satire that focused on their experience in the gulag, fleeing Europe, and their experience as new immigrants to Israel.

A famous sketch, "Einstein Weinstein", plays a lot like Abbott and Costello's "Who's on First." The bit on the show explained Albert Einstein's theory of relativity with one explaining to the other "If you have seven hairs in your soup, it's a lot. If you have seven hairs on your head, it's very little. That's relativity."

== Filmography and Stage ==
- Al khet (I Have Sinned, film, 1936) Dzigan as Szamaj, Schumacher as Awrejmel
- Jolly Paupers (film, 1937) Dzigan as Kopl, Schumacher as Naftali
- On a heym (Without a Home, film, 1938) Dzigan as Motele, Schumacher as Fisele
- Unzere kinder (It Will Never Happen Again, film, 1951) as themselves
- On the Ship to Eretz Yisrael
