= Bergner =

Bergner is a surname. Notable people with the surname include:

- Amelia Bergner (1853–1923), American photographer
- Audrey Bergner (1927–2022), Israeli artist
- Austin Bergner (born 1997), American baseball player
- Christoph Bergner (born 1948), German politician
- Daniel Bergner, American writer
- David Bergner (born 1973), German association football manager
- Elisabeth Bergner (1897–1986), German actress
- Heinrich Bergner (1865–1918), German art historian
- Herz Bergner (1907–1970), Australian novelist
- Hinde Bergner (1870–1942), Yiddish-language writer from Galicia
- Ignacio Bergner (born 1984), Argentinian field hockey player
- Jeffrey Bergner (born 1946), American political operative, lobbyist, and official
- Joel Bergner, American street artist
- Julie Bergner, American mathematician
- Ola Bergner (born 1972), also known as Ola Schubert, Swedish flash animator
- Patrik Bergner (born 1962), Swedish actor, film director, and playwright
- Sasha Bergner (born 1974), also known as Sasha Carter, Canadian curler
- Yosl Bergner (1920–2017), Israeli painter
- Zechariah Choneh Bergner (1893–1976), real name of Melech Ravitch, Canadian Yiddish poet and essayist

== See also ==
- Bergner's, department store
