= Hinde Bergner =

- הינדא בערגנער
- Born: Hinde Rosenblatt; 10 October 1870; Radymno, Kingdom of Galicia and Lodomeria, Austria-Hungary
- Died: 1942? Belzec extermination camp, Poland
- Spouse: Efrayim Bergner (married 1891-1939)
- Children: Moshe Harari Zechariah Bergner Herz Bergner

Hinde Bergner (née Rosenblatt) (10 October 1870 – 1942) was a Yiddish-language writer from Galicia.

== Biography ==
She was born October 10, 1870, in Radymno, Galicia (then part of the Austro-Hungarian Empire), one of six children of Joseph and Bluma Rosenblatt. Her father owned a local granary, and Hinde was expected to help with the accounting of the family business growing up. She grew up in a Hasidic family, though her father was somewhat open to modern and secular innovations, paying for Hinde to learn Polish, German, and secular subjects. As a young girl, Hinde ran away to Jaroslaw to stay with an aunt when she thought her parents would forbid her from continuing her education.

In 1891, she married Efrayim Bergner, with whom she had three sons. Moshe Bergner (later Harari) was born in 1892, and later immigrated to Mandatory Palestine, where he attended the Bezalel art school before committing suicide at age 21. Zechariah Bergner (1893-1976), moved to Warsaw, and later Montreal, where he became a prominent Yiddish writer and poet under the pen name Melech Ravitch. His son Yosl Bergner (1920-2017), was a well-known Israeli painter. Her youngest son, Herz Bergner (1907-1970) was a Yiddish prose writer who immigrated to Australia prior to World War II.

During World War I, the family spent three years in Vienna as refugees. Her husband Efrayim tried several different occupations to remain financially stable, including liquor distillation and typesetting, before his death in 1939. With the onset of the Second World War, Hinde fled to the Soviet Union, first to Rawa Ruska (Rava-Ruska), Przemyśl, and then to Przemyślany (Peremyshliany), near Lemberg (Lwów/Lviv). She is believed to have died in 1942 in Belzec extermination camp.

Before her death she desperately sent a message to her son, through Red Cross, “I am very weak … it will soon be too late.”

== Writing ==
Hinde began writing a family memoir in 1937, which she mailed to her sons in installments. Her last correspondence was in 1941. Her memoir, In di lange vinternekht, mishpokhe-zikhroynes fun a shtetl in galitsye, 1870-1900 (In the long winter nights, family memoirs from a town in Galicia, 1870-1900) describes the experience of modernization and secularization, and the tensions that followed, in her childhood shtetl. It is significant for its female perspective on cultural change and modernization within the Jewish community. It was published posthumously in 1946, with a foreword by her sons. The book was later translated from Yiddish by Justin Cammy. A Hebrew translation by Arye Aharoni, titled Belelot haḥoref haarukim, zikhronot mishpaḥa meayara begalitsya, was published in 1982. Otto Müller published a German translation in 1995. An English translation, with an introduction by Justin Cammy, was published by Harvard University Press in 2005.
