= Di Chaliastre =

Jewish avant-garde literary and artistic group

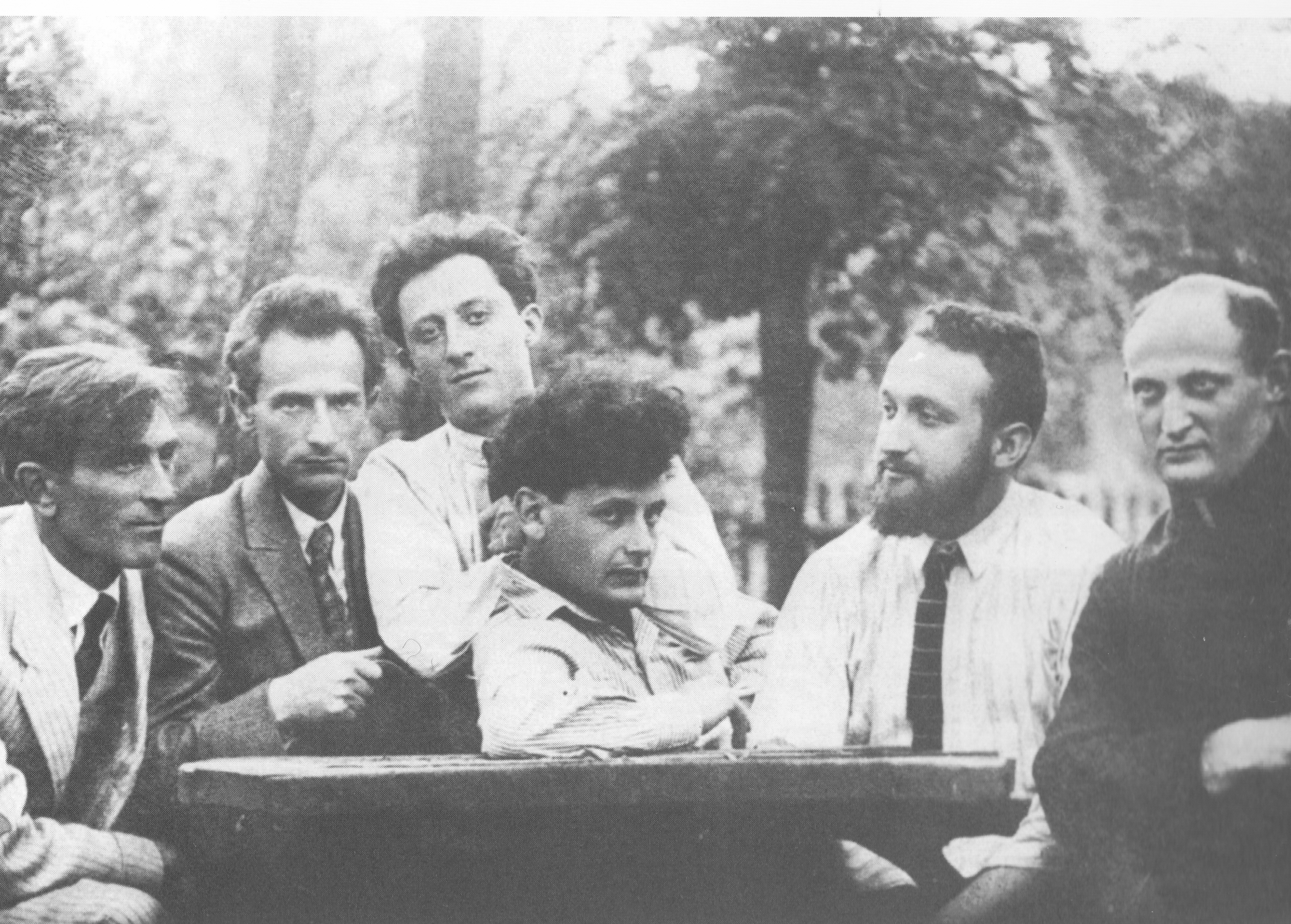
Poets from the group in Warsaw. From the left: Mendel Elkin, Peretz Hirschbein, Uri Zvi Greenberg, Peretz Markish, Melech Ravitch, Israel Joshua Singer (1922)

Di Chaliastre or Khalyastre (די כאַליאַסטרע, from Polish "halastra" - gang) was a Jewish avant-garde expressionist-futuristic group of poets, who worked in Warsaw between 1919 and 1924. The poets wrote in Yiddish and published a namesake magazine.

The name of the group comes from the term Hillel Zeitlin used for them in the newspaper Der Moment. The group was formed around 1922 around Michał Weichert's literary and artistic monthly magazine "Ringen", published since 1921. Its main contributors were Peretz Markish, Melech Ravitch and Uri Zvi Greenberg.

Poets Issac Kipnis, Moisei Khashevatsky, and David Hofstein also became a part of the group.

== History ==
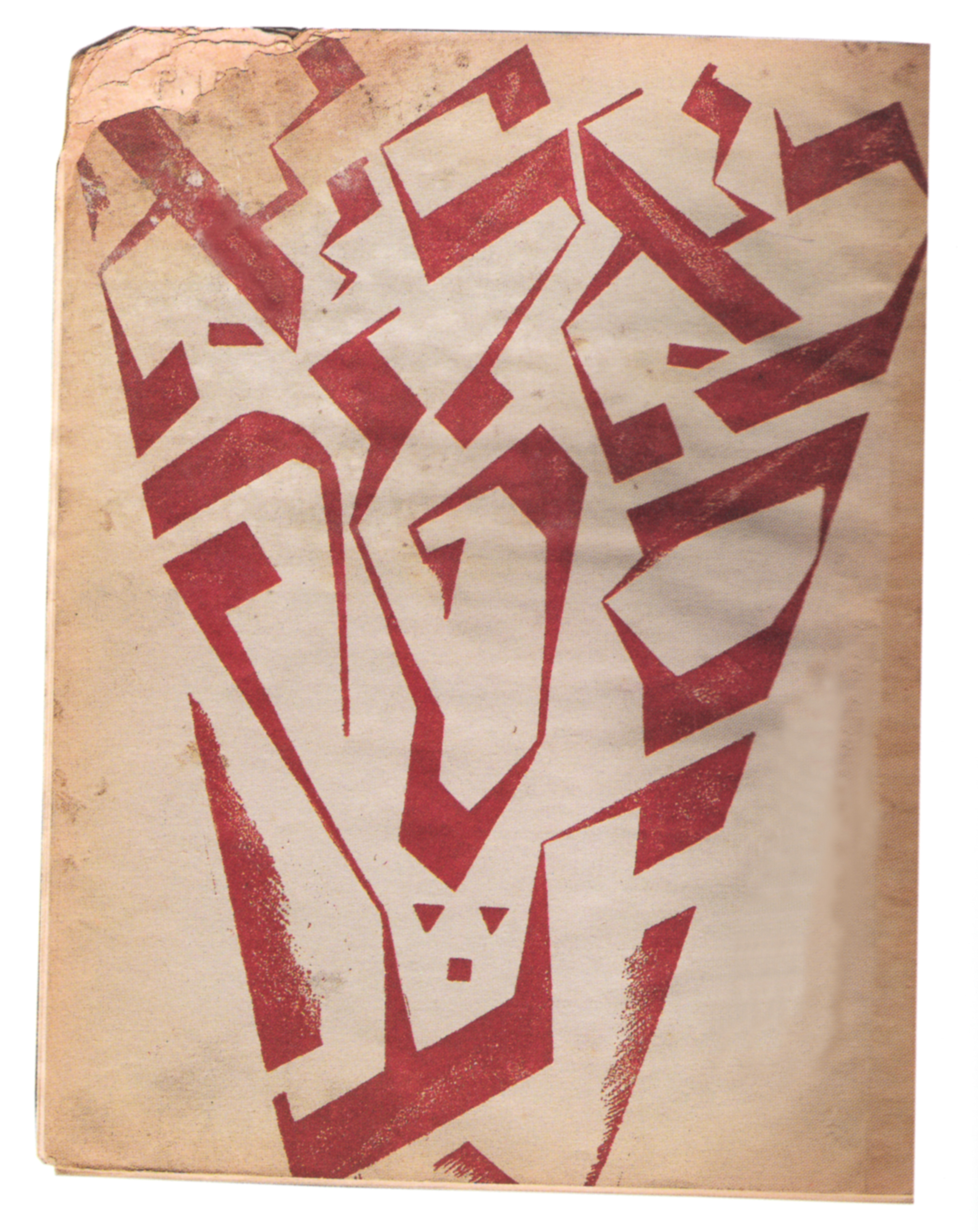
Cover of the first issue of Khalyastre, created by Władysław Wajntraub, 1922

Seth L. Wolitz divided the group's history into three periods:

(1) the year 1919, with the Łódź group associated with Yung-yidish; (2) the transitional period 1921–1922, with the group surrounding Mikhal Vaykhert (Michał Weichert) and Alter-Sholem Kacyzne's Ringen; and (3) the golden period of 1922–1924, which spawned Di Khalyastre, Vog (The Scales; edited by Melech Ravitch), and Albatros, the most thoroughly avant-garde expressionist journal of Uri Tsevi Grinberg.

The first edition of the almanac with the title "Khalyastre" was published in Warsaw in 1922; the editors were Peretz Markish and Israel Joshua Singer. The second issue came out in Paris in 1924; editors: Markish and Oser Varshawski, artist - Marc Chagall.

Moishe Broderzon's poem was chosen as a motto of the journal. "Mir yungen, mir a freylekhe tsezungene khalyastre / Mir geyen in an umbavustn veg, / In tife moreshkhoyredike teg / In nekht fun shrek / Per aspera ad astra!" (We, the young, a happy, boisterous gang / We're trodding on an unknown path / through deeply melancholic days / through nights of fright / Per aspera ad astra!). The poem was first published in Moshe Broderzon's journal Yung-yidish in Łódź, 1919.

The almanac "Albatross" was also published under the editorship of Greenberg; (issue 1, Warsaw, 1922; issue 2, Berlin, 1923).

The books of the leaders of "Khalyastre" caused a wide resonance - "Nakete Lider" ("Naked Poems", 1921) by Melech Ravitch, "Mephisto" ("Mephistopheles", 1922) by Uri Zvi Greenberg, and "Di Coupe" ("Heap", 1922) by Peretz Markish, in which the theoretical propositions proclaimed by the group - the renewal of the poetic language, the exaltation that explodes verse and the "revolution of the spirit" - are expressed with vivid artistic force.

Beginning in 1923, the paths of the members of the group diverged and its activity began to die down. The main reasons were political disagreements and emigration of its members from Warsaw.

== Sources ==
- Tarnowska, Magdalena (2003). Oprac. Zofia Borzymińska, Rafał Żebrowski (ed.). Polski słownik judaistyczny. Dzieje – kultura – religia – ludziem, Vol. 1. Warsaw: Prószyński i S-ka. ISBN 83-7255-126-X.
- Марк Шагал (2009). Мой мир: первая автобиография Шагала : воспоминания, интервью. ISBN 978-5751607746.
- Светлана Амосова, ed. (2019). Вещь – символ – знак (Object – Symbol – Sign ) (PDF). Moscow: Sefer. p. 151. ISBN 978-5-7576-0430-5.
