= Alter Kacyzne =

Yiddish writer and photographer (1885–1941)

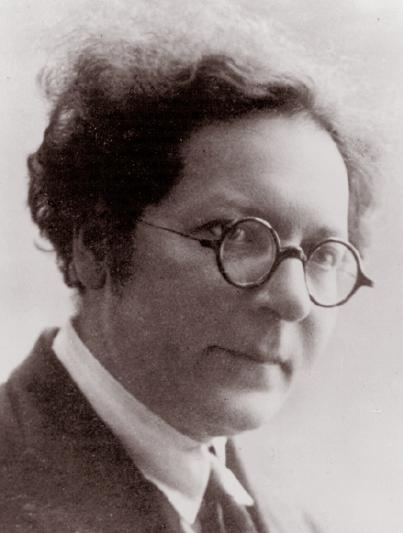
- Born: 31 May 1885; Vilnius, Russian Empire, (now Lithuania)
- Died: 7 July 1941 (aged 56); Ternopil, Occupied Polish Territories (Now in Ukraine)
- Occupations: Photographer, writer

Alter Kacyzne (Yiddish: אַלטער קאַציזנע, Alter Kacizne; 31 May 1885 in Vilnius, Russian Empire – 7 July 1941 in Ternopil, General Government for the Occupied Polish Territories) was a Jewish (Yiddish) writer, poet and photographer, known as one of the most significant contributors to Jewish-Polish cultural life in the first half of the 20th century. Among other things, he is particularly known as a photographer whose work immortalised Jewish life in Poland in the 1920s and 1930s.

== Biography ==
=== Early life and education ===
Alter-Sholem Kacyzne was born on 31 May 1885 to a poor working-class family in Vilna in the Russian Empire (now Vilnius, Lithuania), within the Pale of Settlement (the mandatory territory allowed as residence for Jews). His father worked as a bricklayer and his mother worked as a seamstress. Kacyzne spoke Yiddish at home and was educated in a cheder and in a Russian-Jewish school. An avid reader, he taught himself Hebrew, Russian, Polish, German and French.

Following the death of his father in 1899, when Kacyzne was fourteen, he went to work as an apprentice in his uncle's professional photography studio in Ekaterinoslav, Novorossiya (now Dnipro, Ukraine). While engaged in self-education, he began to write short stories in Russian. He also wrote poems and sent some of these to the Yiddish author S. Ansky.

=== Adult life and career ===
Alter Kacyzne with his wife Khana and daughter Sulamita in Warsaw, Poland ca. 1930.

Around this time he married Khana Khachnov. In 1910, greatly attracted by the Yiddish works of I. L. Peretz, he moved to Warsaw, where he developed a close relationship with Peretz, who became his literary mentor. In Warsaw he opened a photographic studio.

In the 1920s, he worked as a photojournalist for the New York City-based newspaper Forverts (Forward). He travelled as a photographer to Poland, Romania, Italy, Spain, Palestine and Morocco. In the years 1927–1928 Kacyzne's photographs, accompanied by his travel essays, were published in the Warsaw magazine Our Express.

His work as a photographer was combined with his literary work. As a critic and essayist, he published articles on literary and social issues in Warsaw and Vilna. He was co-editor of several journals.

In the early 1920s he founded the literary series The Ark (Di Teyve, 1920, together with David Einhorn), the short-lived magazines Bells (Glokn, 1921) and The Links (Ringen, 1921–1922, in cooperation with Michal Veiherte ). In 1924 he became co-founder of the magazine Literary Pages (Literarishe Bleter, 1924–1939; together with Israel Joshua Singer, Peretz Markish, Melech Ravitch and Nachman Mayzel).

In 1930 he participated in newspapers with a communist orientation: Literary Tribune (Literarishe Tribune; 1930–1933), Tribune (1934), Comrade (Der Fraynd, 1934–1935, Yiddish: דער פֿרייַנד), Literature (Literatur; 1935) In 1937–1938, he issued the fortnightly magazine, My film speaks (Mayn redndiker film), the contents of which were critical articles, translations and satires.

=== War and death ===
In 1939, after the Nazi occupation of Poland, he fled with his family to Soviet-occupied Lvov (today Lviv, Ukraine). He was put in charge of the literary section of the Lvov State Jewish Theatre. When Germany went on to attack the Soviets in 1941, Kacyzne tried to escape the Nazis and moved farther east to the also Soviet-occupied city of Tarnopol (today Ternopil, Ukraine). By the time he arrived, the Nazis had already occupied Tarnopol. Kacyzne was beaten to death by Ukrainian collaborators during a pogrom directed against the town's Jewish population on 7 July 1941. His wife Khana was murdered in the Belzec extermination camp. Their daughter Sulamita (1927–1999) survived by hiding in Poland as a non-Jew. She later married the Italian diplomat Eugenio Reale.

== Photography ==
Arriving in Warsaw in 1910, Kacyzne opened his own photography studio. Originally it was located on Długa street; the address changed several times. Kacyzne worked at portraits, shooting memorable events (weddings, bar mitzvahs), and soon became a well-known photographer. The turning point in his professional career as a photographer began in 1921, when he was commissioned by the Hebrew Immigrant Aid Society (HIAS), a charitable organisation based in the United States of America, to make a series of images dedicated to the life of Jews in Polish cities and towns, including the eastern lands that were part of the territory of Poland – Galicia and Volhynia. As a result, Kacyzne travelled to more than 120 Polish settlements. These images so impressed Abraham Cahan, Chief Editor of the New York newspaper Forward, that he suggested that Kacyzne document Jewish life in Poland for his publication.

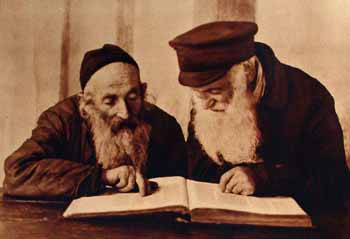
Reading the Mishnah. Pinsk. 1924

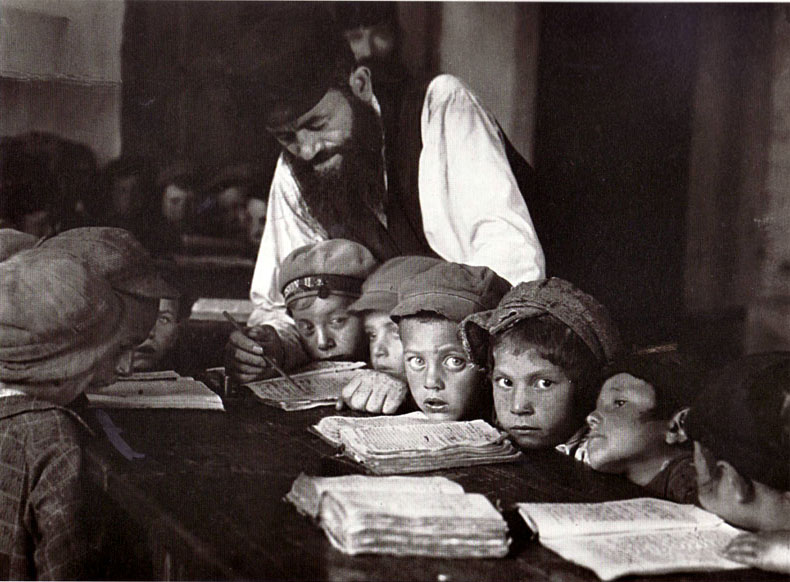
The cheder (Jewish primary school). Lublin. 1924

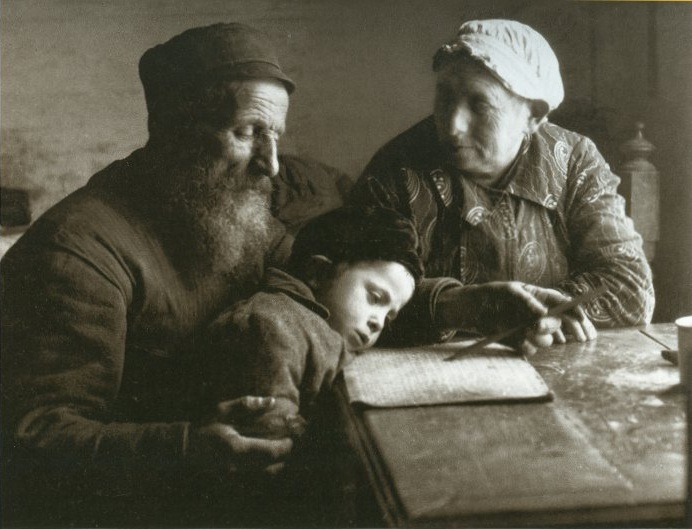
Wolf Nachowicz, the gravedigger, teaches his grandson to read, while the boy's grandmother looks on with pleasure. (Biala Podlaska, Lublin province).

Kacyzne's precious historical collection was almost entirely destroyed during the Nazi occupation; only a selection of 700 photographs survived. After the Holocaust, the imagery acquired not only artistic, but also historical value, documenting the pre-war life of the Polish Jewish community. These photographs, which are an important part of Kacyzne's work, are now kept in the YIVO Archive (Institute for Jewish Research) in Manhattan and in the Bibliothèque Medem of Paris.

Due in large part to Sulamita Kacyzne-Reale's efforts, the following of her father's books were published after the war: Geklibene shriftn ("Selected Writings"; 1951), Shtarke un shvakhe ("Strong and Weak"; 1954), Gezamelte shriftn ("Collected Writings"; four volumes, 1967–1972), and Shvartsbard (1980), about Sholem Schwartzbard, who assassinated the Ukrainian nationalist Symon Petliura in 1926.

== Published works ==
- Poyln: Jewish Life in the Old Country (Metropolitan Books, 1999) ISBN 0-805-05097-3

== Awards ==
- 1999: National Jewish Book Award in the Yiddish Literature category for Poyln: Jewish Life in the Old Country

== See also ==
- Roman Vishniac (1897-1990), Jewish photographer of similar fame; photographed traditional Jewish life in Eastern Europe in 1935-39
