= Blood Harvest =

Blood Harvest may refer to:

- Blood Harvest (Dicks novel), a novel by Terrance Dicks, based on the British television series Doctor Who
- Steel and Iron, a 1927 novel by Israel Joshua Singer, previously translated as Blood Harvest
- Blood Harvest (film), a 1987 American slasher film
- "Blood Harvest", a campaign in the 2008 video game, Left 4 Dead
- The Curse of Audrey Earnshaw, a 2020 film released under the title Blood Harvest in the United Kingdom
