= Belarusian Canadians =

Belarusian Canadians Беларусы Канады Canadiens biélorusses
- (Belarusian Democratic Republic) (Canada)
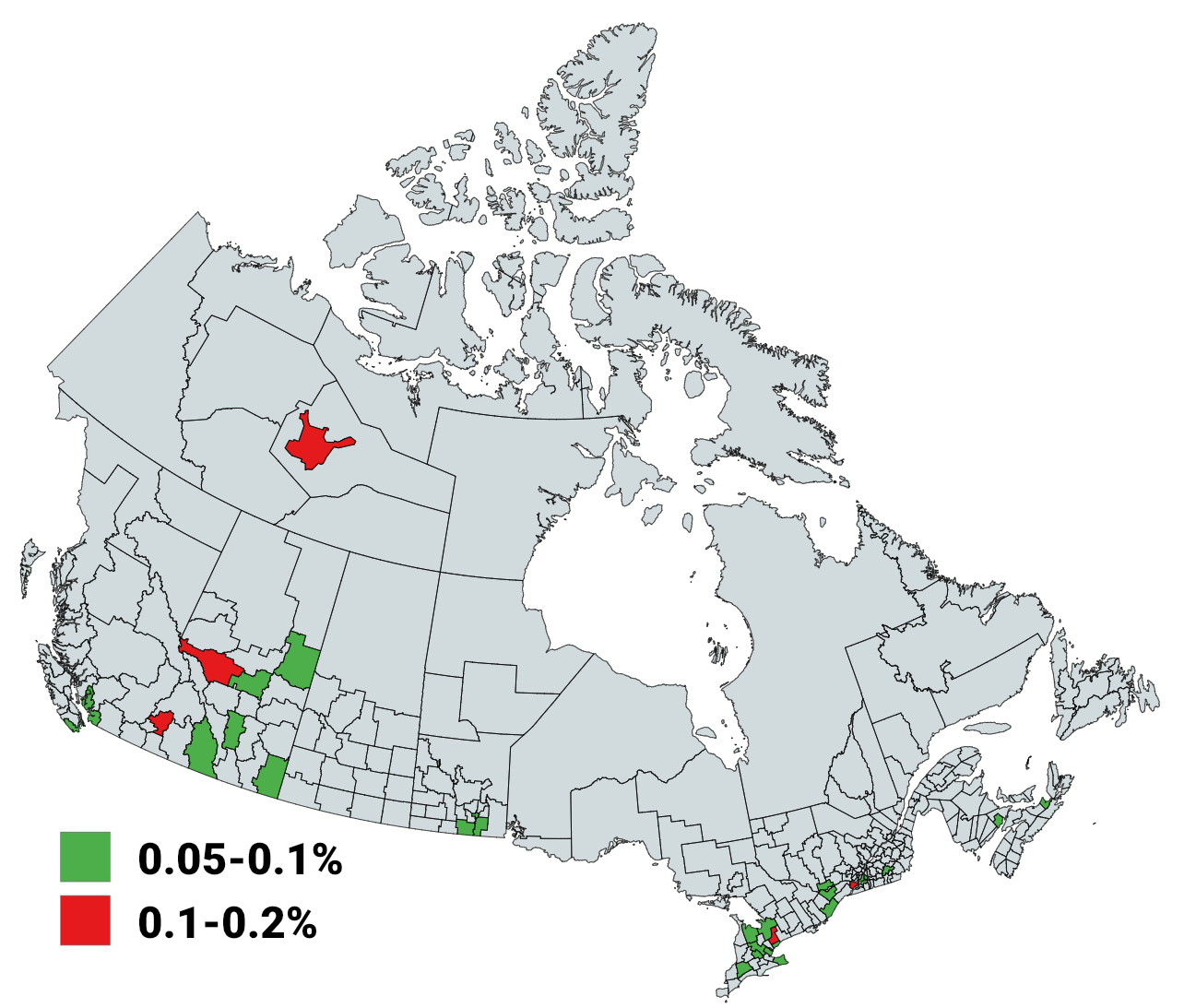
- Belarusian Canadians as a percent of population by census division (2021)

Total population
- (18,850, (by ancestry, 2021 Census) 0.05% of total population)

Regions with significant populations
- Ontario and Quebec

Languages
- Canadian English · Canadian French · Belarusian

Religion
- Christianity · Judaism

Related ethnic groups
- Russian Canadians · Ukrainian Canadians

Belarusian Canadians (Belarusian: Беларусы Канады, romanized: Biełarusy Kanady; French: Canadiens biélorusses) are Canadian citizens of Belarusian descent or Belarusian-born individuals who reside in Canada. According to the 2021 Census, there were 18,850 Canadians who claimed Belarusian ancestry.

Vincent Žuk-Hryškievič estimated the number of Belarusians in Canada in late 1959 at about 40,000, with a majority of Russian Empire era Belarusian immigrants being listed as Russians or Poles because Belarusians were not present as a separate category in Canadian documents. Belarusian became an option on the Canadian census in 1971.

Victor Turek, a Polish-born scholar, wrote that the first Belarusians came to Canada in 1817 along with members of De Watteville's Regiment who settled in the Red River Colony in what became Manitoba. Turek noted 10 Poles were among the settlers, and argued three of them were actually Belarusians. Belarusian immigrants likely first started coming to Canada at the end of the nineteenth century. Their numbers increased at the start of the twentieth century, though they were often classified as Poles or Russians. This further increased in the aftermath of the First World War, with scholar John Sadouski estimating that some 16,600 Belarusians came to Canada between 1927 and 1930 alone.

The oldest Belarusian diaspora organization in Canada, Belarusian Canadian Alliance, was established by Kastus Akula in 1948 in Toronto.

== Notable individuals ==
- Kastuś Akuła (1925–2008), writer
- Valery Fabrikant (1940–2026), academic and mass shooter
- Albert Gretzky (born 1942), Conservative Party politician
- Walter Gretzky (1938–2021) philanthropist and former professional ice hockey player
- Wayne Gretzky (born 1961), former professional ice hockey player and coach
- David Lewis (1909–1981), labour lawyer and social democratic politician
- Barys Rahula (1920–2005)
- Esther Shumiatcher-Hirschbein (1899–1985), Yiddish-language poet and screenwriter active in New York City and Los Angeles.
- Ivonka Survilla (born 1938), President of the Rada of the Belarusian Democratic Republic since 1997
- Vincent Žuk-Hryškievič (1903–1989), President of the Rada of the Belarusian Democratic Republic between 1970–1982

== See also ==
- Belarus–Canada relations
- Belarusian diaspora
- Immigration to Canada
- Belarusian Americans
- Russian Canadians
- Ukrainian Canadians
