= Pinchas Goldhar =

- Born: 14 June 1901; Lodz, Poland
- Died: 25 January 1947 (aged 45); Melbourne, Victoria, Australia
- Writing career
- Language: Yiddish
- Period: 1931–1947

Pinchas Goldhar (14 June 1901 – 25 January 1947) was a Polish and then Australian writer and translator, who wrote mainly in the Yiddish language.

== Early life and career ==
Pinchas Goldhar was born in Lodz, Poland, then part of Russia, on 14 June 1901, the oldest of four siblings of Jacob Goldhar (1878 - 1945), a dyer, and Rachel Goldhar (née Hirshkowitz). Pinchas had a Jewish high school and university education.

By 1922 Goldhar was working for the daily Lodz Yiddish newspaper Lodzsher Togblat ("The Lodz Daily"). Around this time Yiddish literature was experiencing somewhat of a renaissance in Poland, and Goldhar quickly became a Yiddish writer of note. He translated many German and French novels into Yiddish. One of the stories he translated was The Weavers by the German writer Gerhart Hauptmann. After Goldhar translated this story it became a favorite of the Yiddish stage.

== In Australia ==
In Poland anti-Semitism was increasing, and to escape it, Jacob Goldhar, now a widower, took his four children to Australia in 1926. By 1928 the family was settled in Melbourne, Victoria, and Jacob Goldhar started a small dyeing business, in which Pinchas initially joined.

On 16 June 1931, Goldhar became inaugural editor for about three years of the first Yiddish newspaper in Australia. The name of the paper was Australier Leben ("Australian Life") and was produced at the time by printer and stationer David Altshul until 1933, when the newspaper was sold to Leslie Rubinstein. In 1937 Goldhar contributed to the first Yiddish book published in Australia, the Australian Jewish Almanac. In 1939 he contributed to the second published book Stories from Australia. These books attracted worldwide reviews and even caught the attention of Bashevis Singer, a favorable noted critique. Some of the stories that were written have been translated into modern day English.

In 1934, Goldhar married Ida Shlezynger and they had three children. He died of a coronary thrombosis on 25 January 1947.

Throughout his life Goldhar translated many stories including those of Henry Lawson, Susannah Pritchard, Frank Dalby Davison, Alan Marshall and Vance Palmer. He was very interested in the quality at which the Australian literature was written. His essay about Australian literature was later translated by Nita Bluthal and Stephen Murray-Smith and published in the Melbourne University Magazine in 1947. Also throughout his life he built a circle of friends, both Jewish and non-Jewish.

== Legacy ==
William Rubinstein and Hilary L. Rubinstein dedicated their book The Jews in Australia (1986) to Goldhar.

In 2016, an important collection of Goldhar's stories was published in English translation, The Collected Stories of Pinchas Goldhar: A Pioneer Yiddish Writer in Australia. Along with the republished version of Between Sky and Sea by Herz Bergner, it was the subject of "a major survey of Yiddish-Australian literature" written by Louis Klee for the Sydney Review of Books in 2018. Goldhar has also been the subject of a number of scholarly essays.

Goldhar Place, a small laneway running off Lygon Street in Carlton, Victoria, is named in his honour.
