= Peretz Markish =

Ukrainian Jewish poet and playwright writing mainly in Yiddish

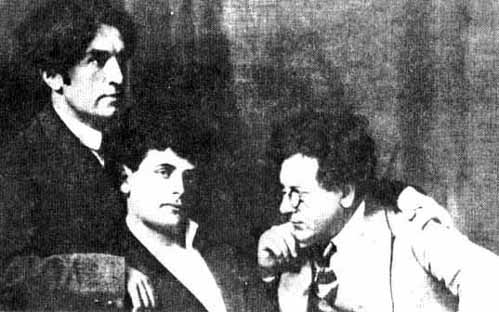
- Left to right: Moishe Broderzon, Peretz Markish, Alter Kacyzne
- Born: Peretz Davidovich Markish; 7 December 1895 (25 November OS); Polonne, Volyn Governorate, Russian Empire
- Died: 12 August 1952; Lubyanka Prison, Moscow, Soviet Union

Peretz Davidovich Markish (Yiddish: פּרץ מאַרקיש) (Russian: Пе́рец Дави́дович Ма́ркиш) (7 December [O.S. 25 November] 1895 – 12 August 1952) was a Russian Jewish poet and playwright who wrote predominantly in Yiddish.

== Early years ==
Peretz Markish was born in 1895 in Polonne, the Russian Empire (now Ukraine) to a Sephardi Jewish family. As a child he attended a cheder and sang in the choir of the local synagogue. He served as a private in the Russian Imperial Army during World War I. He was discharged from the army after the Russian Revolution, and settled in Ekaterinoslav (now Dnipropetrovsk), Ukraine. In 1918, he relocated to Kyiv.

== Life ==
Markish's first poetry collection, Shveln ("Thresholds"), published in Kiev in 1919, established his reputation. His poetry cycle Di kupe ("The Heap"; 1921) was written in response to the Ukrainian pogroms of 1919–20.

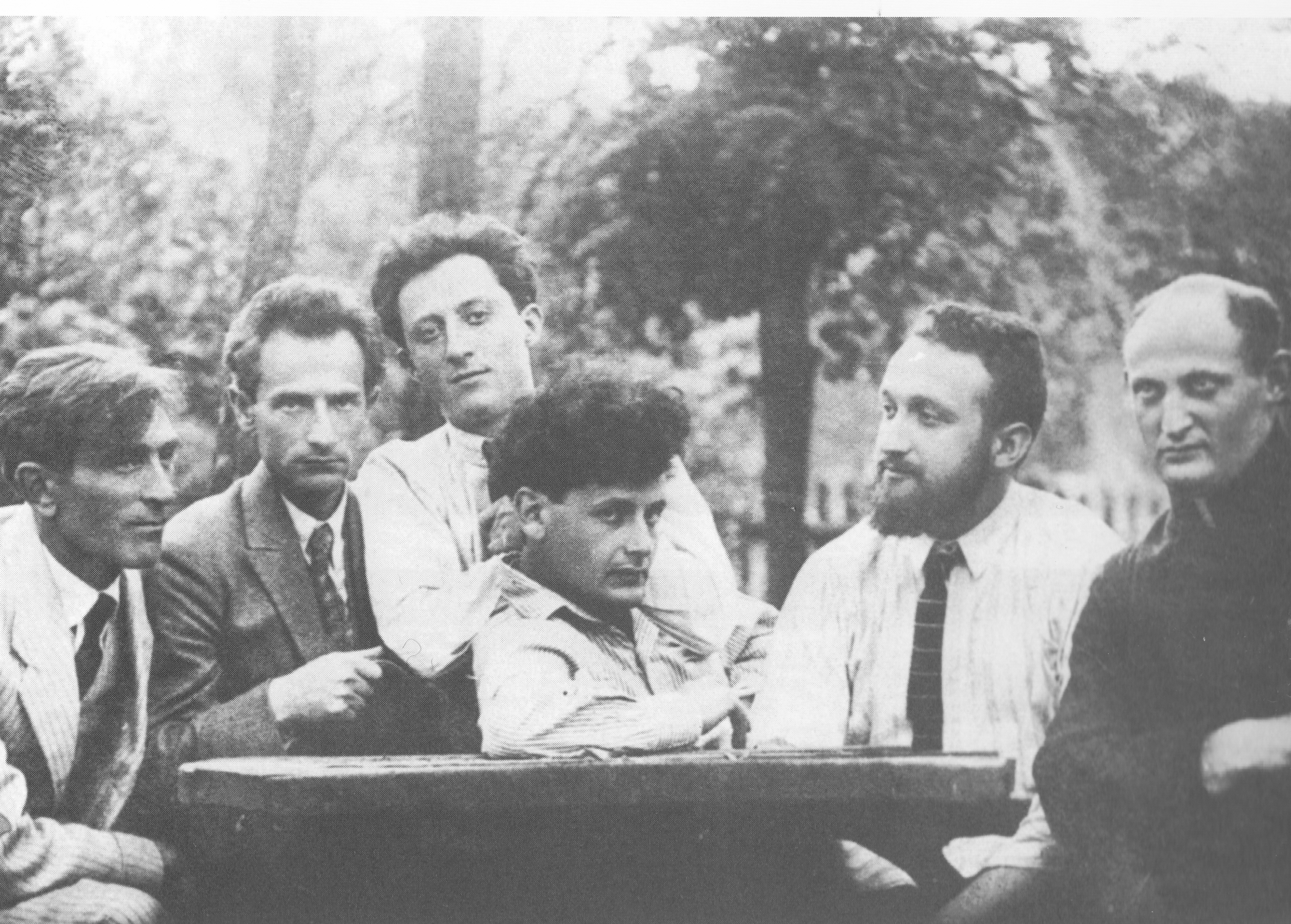
Peretz Markish (in centre), with Mendl Elkin, Peretz Hirschbein, Uri Zvi Greenberg, Melech Ravitch and I. J. Singer in 1922.

In the early 1920s, he was a member of the Kiev group of Yiddish poets that included David Hofstein and Leib Kvitko. After a series of pogroms took place in Ukraine, he moved to Warsaw and in Western Europe. While in Warsaw, he co-edited with I. J. Singer the expressionist literary anthology Di Chaliastre ("The Gang"; 1922). Uri Zvi Grinberg and Melech Ravitch edited other literary publications. A second and final volume of Halyastre, edited with Oser Varshawski, appeared in Paris in 1924 with a cover illustration by Marc Chagall. In 1924 he was a co-founder and editor of the Literarishe Bleter in Warsaw.

In 1926, Markish returned to the Soviet Union. There he published a number of optimistic poems glorifying the communist regime, including Mayn dor ("My Generation"; 1927) and the epic Brider ("Brothers"; 1929). His novel Dor oys, dor ayn ("Generation After Generation"; 1929), about the genesis of revolution in a small Jewish town, was condemned for "Jewish chauvinism." As a co-founder of the Soviet School of Writers he was awarded the Order of Lenin in 1939.

Markish joined the Soviet Communist party in early 1942 when he took a job at the International Division of Sovinformburo, while a colleague Teumin was the press agent. The bureau head Lozovsky banned them from any further contact with JAC; effectively cutting them off from the international socialist element altogether. The monitors started looking through their post, investigating the articles they wrote. In April 1942, Stalin had ordered the formation of the Jewish Anti-Fascist Committee designed to influence international public opinion and organize political and material support for the Soviet fight against Nazi Germany, particularly from the West. Solomon Mikhoels, a popular actor and director of the Moscow State Jewish Theater, was appointed its chairman. They wrote texts and petitions almost as cries for help against the Nazi pogroms; among other countries the texts were printed in U.S. newspapers. The JAC also raised funds. In 1946, he was awarded the Stalin Prize, and wrote several paeans to Joseph Stalin, including a 20,000-line epic poem Milkhome ("War") in 1948.

However, Stalin soon changed policy towards the liquidation of the Jewish Anti-Fascist Committee and against the remnants of official Jewish cultural activity in the Soviet Union. Solomon Mikhoels was murdered by the secret police in January 1948, to avoid a show trial. Other writers were accused of treason, and other "crimes", and arrested. Markish was accused of being a "Jewish nationalist", and arrested in January 1949, and shot with other Jewish writers during the Night of the Murdered Poets in August 1952.

After Stalin's death, Markish's widow Esther and his sons, literary scholar Shimon Markish and prose writer David Markish, actively set out to redeem his memory. Following Markish's official rehabilitation in November 1955, several comprehensive editions of his poems, translated into Russian by Anna Akhmatova, were published in 1957. His oldest child, daughter Olga Rapay-Markish by his first wife, Zinaida Joffe, was a Ukrainian ceramicist.

== Writings ==
Markish wrote a number of poems and plays, as well as several novels.

Markish is one of the three heroes, with his fellow Yiddish poets Uri Zvi Grinberg (1896–1981) and Melekh Ravitsh (1893–1976), of Gilles Rozier's novel D'un pays sans amour.

== Selected works ==
- Shveln ("Thresholds"), 1919
- Stam ("Just So"), 1920 (2nd Ed, Warsaw 1922)
- Pist und Pas, 1920
- Inmitn veg ("Midway"), 1920
- Wohlin, Vilna 1921 (Poem)
- Die Kupe ("The Heap"), Kiev 1922 (Poem about the pogroms in Ukraine)
- Chaliastre Almanach (Scrapbook, 1922)
- Owentschu'en, Kiev 1922
- Radio, Warsaw 1923 (Poem)
- Sang-Gesang ("Sang-song"), about 1926 (Song series that picks up the four seasons)
- Der Galaganer Hahn ("The Galaganer Rooster"), drawings of Joseph Tchaikovsky, first in Yiddish Berlin 1922. In Yiddish and German translation included in: David Bergelson, Leib Kvitko, Peretz Markisch, Ber Smoliar. Yiddish children's book Berlin, Yiddish and German.
- Varbeige'endik, ca. 1927 (Collected essays)
- Brider ("Brothers"), 1929 (epic poem glorifying the sacrificial death of two proletarian brothers who gave their lives to the revolution)
- Dor oys, dor ayn ("Generation After Generation"), 1929 (about the comings and goings of generations in the Russian shtetles)
- Eins oif eins ("One on One"), 1934 (novel about the heroic story of a Jewish Mason who leaves America to help build the socialist Russia)
- Poeme wegn Stalinen ("Ode to Stalin"), 1940
- Milkhome ("War"), 1948 (his main work, on which he had worked for years. Epic of World War II)
- Yerushe ("Heritage"), 1959 posthumously, an incomplete epic poem
- Trot fun doyres ("Footsteps of the Generations"), novel written in 1947–48 and published posthumously in 1966, chronicling the heroism of Polish Jews during World War II
