= Winter Story =

Winter Story or A Winter Story may refer to:

== Books ==
- Winter Story (Brambly Hedge) 1980 children's picture book in Jill Barklem's Brambly Hedge series
- Eit vintereventyr (A Winter Story), debut novel of Norwegian writer Jan Roar Leikvoll 2008

== Film and TV ==
- Winter Story, animated film in The Enchanted World of Brambly Hedge VHS 1998
- A Winter Story, 2001 animated Flash film by Ola Schubert
- A Winter Story, a 1986 TV series, see Calon

== Music ==
=== Albums ===
- Winter Story (album), a 2003 album by Shinhwa
- Winter Story, a 2007 album by Mandy Chiang
- Winter Story, a 2000 album by Miki Gavrielov

=== Songs ===
- "A Winter Story", a 1986 single by Aled Jones
- "Winter Story", a 2003 single by Saeko Chiba
- "Winter Story", a 2005 single by Harisu

== See also ==
- The Winter's Tale is a play by William Shakespeare
- The Johnny Winter Story, Johnny Winter 1969
