= Bergler =

Bergler is a surname. Notable people with the surname include:

- Edmund Bergler (1899–1962), Austrian-American psychoanalyst
- Joseph Bergler (1753–1829), Austrian painter and engraver
- Stephan Bergler (c. 1680 – 1738), German classical scholar and antiquarian

== See also ==
- Bergel
- Bergner
