= Literarishe Bleter =

Warsaw literary periodical (1924–1939)

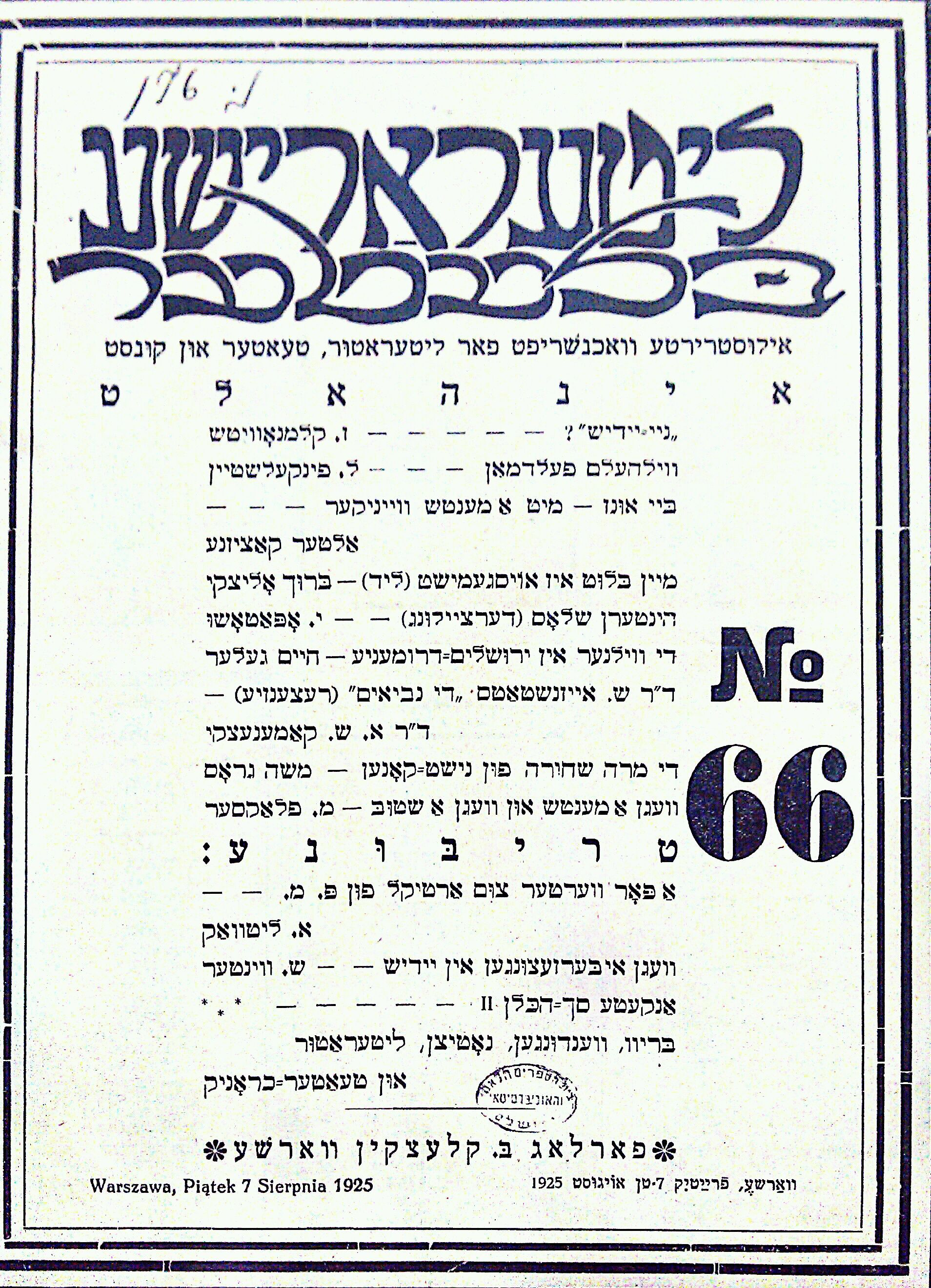
- Issue 66 (7 August 1925)
- Type: Weekly
- Publisher: Nakhmen Mayzel (1925–1935)
- Editor-in-chief: Boris Kletskin (1925–1939)
- Founded: 1924
- Ceased publication: 1939
- Language: Yiddish
- City: Warsaw, Poland
- OCLC number: 145390841

The Literarishe Bleter (Yiddish: ליטערארישע בלעטער, lit. 'Literary Pages') was a Yiddish weekly literary and cultural periodical published in Warsaw from 1924 to 1939.

== History ==
=== Background and creation ===
In the aftermath of the Russian Revolution of 1905, the Russian Empire's restrictions on the use of the Yiddish language were lifted, leading to a flourishing of Yiddish arts, literature, and culture within the Pale of Settlement. The Czernowitz Conference of 1908 proclaimed Yiddish a Jewish national language, leading to the emergence of the Yiddishist movement, opposed to linguistic assimilationism and the Hebraist movement.

In Warsaw, the capital of Russian Poland, an informal community of Yiddish writers emerged, initially centered around the home of playwright I. L. Peretz. In 1924, the publication of the Polish literary journal Wiadomości Literackie inspired Yiddish writers to pursue their own literary journal. The paper was born as a partnership between four writers — novelist Israel Joshua Singer, avant-garde poets Peretz Markish and Melech Ravitch, and publisher Nakhmen Mayzel.

=== Publication ===
All the paper's founders besides Mayzel left the board soon after its formation. Alter Kacyzne and then Moyshe Zilburg both briefly served as assistant editors, but soon Mayzel was again left as the sole editor. In March 1925 (at the paper's 44th issue), publisher Boris Kletskin purchased the periodical after moving from Vilnius to Warsaw. Mayzel maintained his position as the paper's editor-in-chief. In an effort to increase circulation, the paper cooperated with YIVO and the Warsaw Yiddish PEN club, publishing their bulletins alongside the paper.

The Kletskin press went bankrupt in 1935, rendering the Bleter once again self-published. The editorial staff soon founded their own small publishing house. Mayzel left Poland in 1937; journalist Moyshe Kitay succeeded him as editor, although Mayzel was still officially the editor-in-chief. Following its independence and increasing economic worries throughout the 1930s, the paper turned to fundraising campaigns. These were only marginally effective; on June 30, 1939, the paper published its final issue. The end of the paper seemingly came as a surprise, as no information was released about the folding of the paper. Despite occurring only two months before the Invasion of Poland, its discontinuation was unrelated.

== Content ==
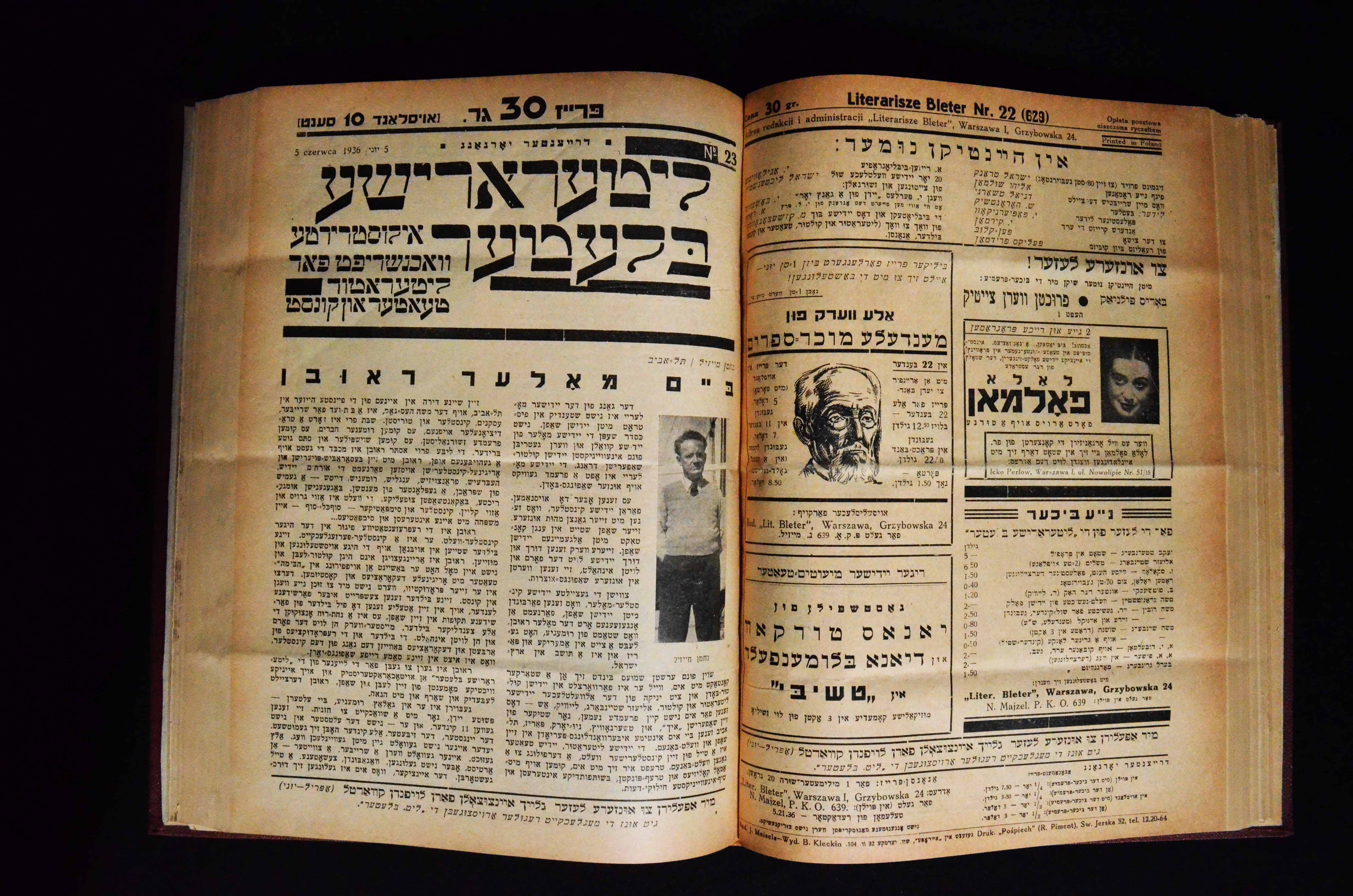
1936 bound volume of the Bleter

The weekly issues of the Literarishe Bleter ranged in pages; for its first year and a half, it was a 6–8 page broadsheet. After issue 66, this was changed to a smaller format paper of 16 to 24 pages. A bound indexed volume was produced every year, and were commonly held at Yiddish libraries. The paper featured creative works, reviews, and coverage of recent literary events. Its content was focused on Yiddish literature and culture, it also included coverage of broader literary developments in Europe, including interviews with authors. Editorials covering Yiddish cultural issues were common throughout the paper.

The paper was a strong promoter of Yiddish books and literature, with various publishing houses advertising their catalogues in the paper. Discussions on the marketing and publishing of Yiddish literature were commonly ran in the paper. The paper occasionally included supplementary issues featuring translations of foreign literature. Between 1932 and 1933, the paper ran a series of special issues on Yiddish culture and literature outside of the main regions of settlement, including installments covering Germany, Galicia, Vilna, and Argentina.

=== Politics ===
Although the editorship of the Bleter was largely seen as pro-Communist by the broader Jewish community in Poland, they criticized the Bund and related socialist movements. This politically isolated the paper, likely preventing it from cooperation with Bundist organizations.
