= The Brothers Ashkenazi =

1935 novel by Israel Joshua Singer

- Title page for The Brothers Ashkenazi (1937)
- Author: Israel Joshua Singer
- Original title: די ברידער אַשכּנזי
- Translator: Maurice Samuel
- Language: Yiddish
- Publisher: Alfred A. Knopf
- Publication date: 1934-35 (serialised); 1936 (in book form)

The Brothers Ashkenazi (Yiddish: די ברידער אַשכּנזי Di brider Ashkenazi) is a 1936 novel by Polish-Jewish writer Israel Joshua Singer. Written in Yiddish, it first appeared serially in the Jewish daily Forward between 1934 and 1935, after Singer had left Poland and moved to New York. It was published in book form in Poland in 1936, the same year in which Knopf published an English translation by Maurice Samuel. It was at the top of New York Times Best Seller list along with Margaret Mitchell's Gone With the Wind. In 1980 a new translation was published by the author's son, Joseph Singer.

== Plot ==
Most of the novel takes place in the Polish city of Łódź, mostly among the large Jewish community that lived there before World War II. It follows the changes from the 19th century through the insurrection of 1905 and ends just after World War I. The main character is Max Ashkenazi, who moves away from his Hasidic Jewish upbringing and becomes a successful industrialist. In the process he destroys all his personal relationships. The upheaval of World War I, the Russian Revolution, and the creation of the Second Polish Republic ruin him financially. Max is consumed by a desire to be more successful than his fraternal twin Jacob. In the last years of his life, Max realizes he was always driven by greed and does his best to restore the family relationships he lost.

This is a historical novel about Jews in Poland, the Industrial Revolution, and the beginnings of Communism. Moreover, it is a story about a man doing what he does best and chasing false idols, ideologies, and glory; Max longs to be called the King of Łódź, and his figure is partly modeled on Izrael Poznański.

== See also ==
- The Promised Land (novel) by Władysław Reymont
