= Esther Shumiatcher-Hirschbein =

Belarusian-Canadian Yiddish poet and screenwriter (1899–1985)

- Эстар Шумячар-Гіршбейн; אסתר שומיאַטשער־הירשבײן
- Born: Esther Shumiatcher; October 21, 1899; Homyel, Gomel Governorate, Russian Empire
- Died: 1985 (aged 85–86); New York City, New York, US
- Other name: Ethel Smith
- Citizenship: American (from 1958)
- Occupations: Poet; screenwriter
- Spouse: Peretz Hirschbein (m. 1918; died 1948)
- Children: 1
- Writing career
- Language: Yiddish; English

Esther Shumiatcher-Hirschbein (Belarusian: Эстар Шумячар-Гіршбейн; Yiddish: אסתר שומיאַטשער־הירשבײן; October 21, 1899 – 1985) was a Belarusian-Canadian Yiddish-language poet and screenwriter active in New York City and Los Angeles.

== Early life and family ==
Shumiatcher was born Esther Shumiatcher (Belarusian: Эстар Шумячар; Yiddish: אסתר שומיאַטשער) on October 21, 1899 (Note: Also cited as 21 Oct 1900.) in Homyel, Gomel Governorate (present-day Belarus) to tenant farmers Judah Shumiatcher and Chasia Shumiatcher. One of eleven siblings, Shumiatcher-Hirschbein and her family emigrated to Calgary, Alberta in 1911. In Canada the family adopted the surname "Smith" and Shumiatcher-Hirschbein anglicized her first name to "Ethel".

Following graduating high school, Shumiatcher-Hirschbein worked as a waitress and at a meat-packing plant. In 1918, Shumiatcher-Hirschbein met her future husband the Yiddish-language playwright Peretz Hirschbein whilst he was on tour in Calgary. On 11 December 1918, Shumiatcher-Hirschbein married Hirschbein with whom she later had the son Omus Hirschbein, a classical music impresario. (Note: Shumiatcher-Hirschbein's name is listed as "Ethel Smith" on the marriage index.)

== Career ==
Hirschbein exposed Shumiatcher to the Yiddish literary community, which inspired her to start writing in Yiddish as well. The couple settled in New York, but traveled extensively around the world, going through places such as the South Pacific, Asia, and Eastern Europe. In the 1920s they lived in Warsaw, Poland, where Shumiatcher's poetry was well received and published in modernist journals of the time. One such journal based in Berlin took its name, Albatros, from one of her poems.

Shumiatcher wrote groundbreaking poems addressing pregnancy and motherhood following the birth of the couple's son in 1934. Shumiatcher moved to Los Angeles in 1940 where her husband had an offer to write film scripts, of which one was produced. Her husband died in 1948 from lateral sclerosis, after which Shumiatcher primarily gave lectures. She also wrote about widowhood and grief following her husband's death. Other themes reflected eros, nature, and politics. Although she did not write much after 1956, her later works are more highly regarded. Some of her poetry has been translated by Myra Mniewski.

She appears in Ezra Kerman's anthology of Yiddish female poets and is included among a group of Litvak women poets whom Dovid Katz credits with "building" Yiddish poetry outside Eastern Europe.

== Personal life ==
On May 15, 1958 Shumiatcher-Hirschbein became an naturalized American citizen. She eventually moved back to New York City, where she died in 1985.

== Selected works ==
- In Tol (1920)
- Pasn Likht (1925)
- In Shoen Fun Libshaft (1930)
- Ale Tog (1939)
- Lider (1956)
