= Peretz Hirschbein =

Yiddish-language writer (1880–1948)

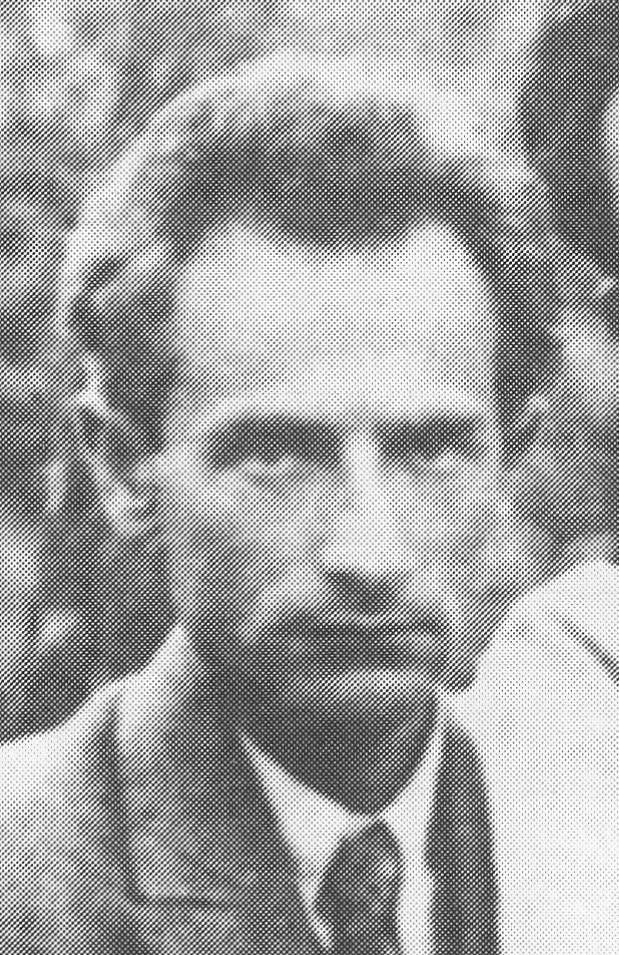
- Hirschbein in 1922
- Born: November 7, 1880; Mielnik, Grodno Governorate, Russian Empire
- Died: August 16, 1948 (aged 67); Los Angeles, California, US
- Spouse: Esther Shumiatcher-Hirschbein (m. 1918)
- Children: 1

Peretz Hirshbein (Yiddish: פרץ הירשביין); November 7, 1880 – August 16, 1948) was a Yiddish-language playwright, novelist, journalist, travel writer, and theater director and producer. Because his work focused more on mood than plot, he became known as "the Yiddish Maeterlinck". His work as a playwright and through his own short-lived but influential troupe, laid much of the groundwork for the second golden age of Yiddish theater that began shortly after the end of World War I. The dialogue of his plays is consistently vivid, terse, and naturalistic. Unusually for a Yiddish playwright, most of his works have pastoral settings: he had grown up the son of a miller, and made several attempts at farming.

== Biography ==
Hirschbein was born November 7, 1880 in the village of Mielnik, Grodno Governorate (present-day Poland) to Sheyne Hirschbein (Note: Also cited as Sheyne Hollander.) and Lippe Hirschbein (Note: Also cited as Lippe der Milner.), a miller. Hirschbein attended cheder in Kleszczele and Brest-Litovsk, before settling in his mother's home shtetl of Milejczyce where he was introduced to secular Yiddish literature.

Hirschbein eventually made his way to Grodno and then Vilna, where he joined a circle of yeshiva students who studied the Bible, Hebrew grammar, and Jewish history together. Hirshbein began giving Hebrew lessons to support himself while publishing Hebrew poetry and writing Yiddish stories. He also began to shift from writing lyrical poetry to naturalist drama, starting with Miryam (1905), which he first wrote in Hebrew, later translated into Yiddish, and later still revised in Yiddish under the title Barg arop (Downhill). During the early 1900s, Hirshbein continued writing naturalist dramas in Hebrew, including Nevelah (Carcass), which in Yiddish (Di neveyle) became one of Hirshbein's most successful works. Olamot bodedim (Lonely Worlds; 1906) marked a new symbolist phase in his career, as well as the end of his practice of writing originally in Hebrew. His symbolist Yiddish plays of this period include the one-act Kvorim-blumen (Grave Blossoms), Di erd (The Earth), In der finster (In the Dark), and Der tkies-kaf (The Handshake). He was instrumental in the revival of Yiddish theater in Russia shortly after the 1904 lifting of the 1883 ban on theatrical performances in that language. Prior to his involvement in Yiddish theater, he wrote several plays in Hebrew; these were published in the periodical Hazman, but there was no audience at that time for Hebrew-language theater.

In 1908 Hirshbein moved to Odessa, where he wrote the drama Yoyel (Joel). Soon afterward, Af yener zayt taykh (On the Other Side of the River), his first Yiddish drama, was produced in Russian in Odessa. In 1909, Ben-Ami met Jacob Ben-Ami and together founded the Hirschbein Troupe on the encouragement of Bialik and by students from an acting conservatory in Odessa. It was the first Yiddish company to devote itself exclusively to "better" Yiddish theater. The troupe toured through Imperial Russia for two years, staging his own plays, as well as works by Sholem Asch, David Pinski, Sholem Aleichem, and Jacob Gordin, as well as translations of plays by Semen Iushkevich and Herman Heijermans. The troupe's high literary standards and high standards of ensemble acting strongly influenced the later Vilna Troupe and Maurice Schwartz's New York-based Yiddish Art Theater.

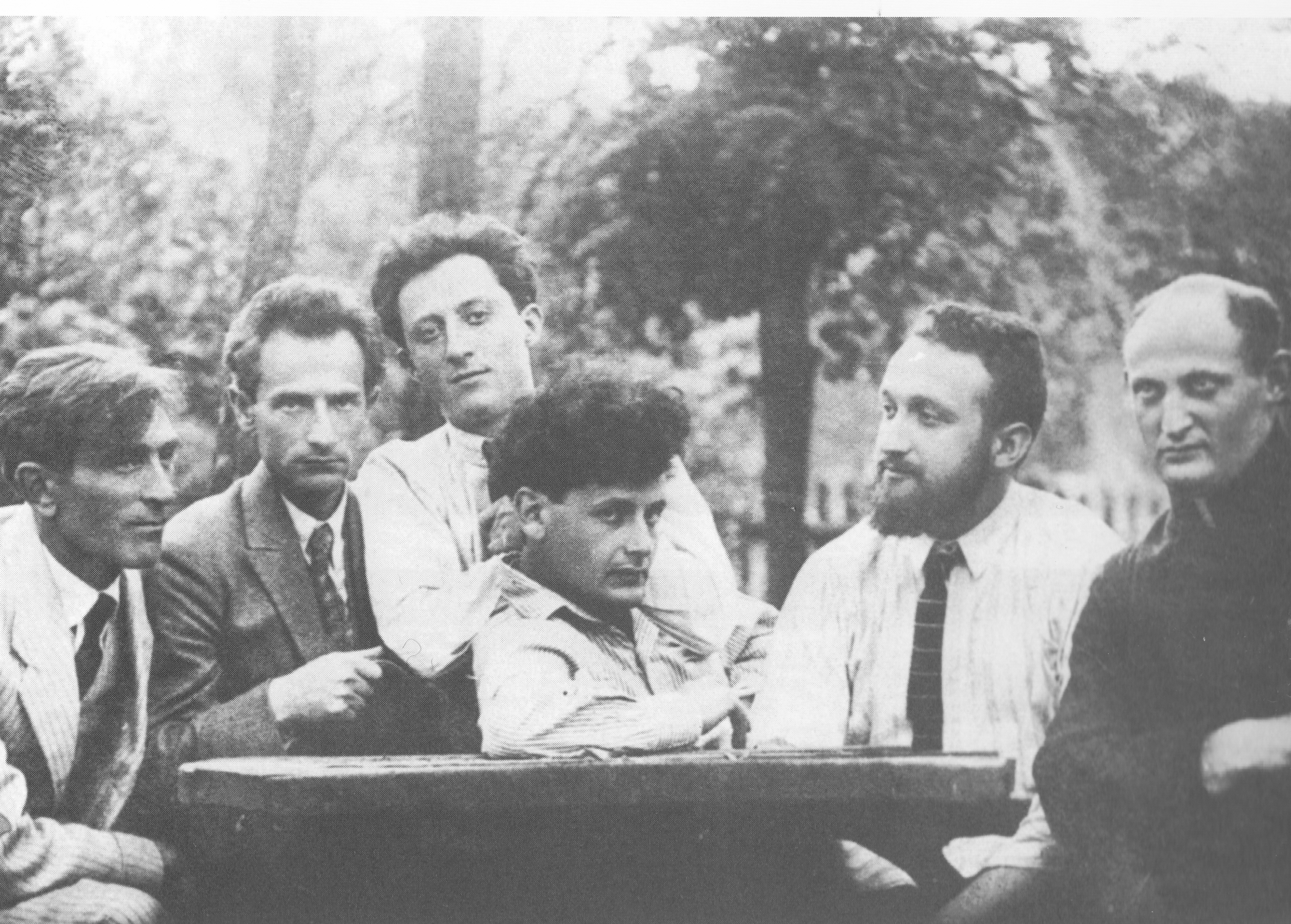
Peretz Hirschbein (second from left), with Mendl Elkin, Uri Zvi Greenberg, Peretz Markish, Melech Ravitch and I. J. Singer in 1922.

The troupe disbanded in 1910 for financial reasons, at which point Hirschbein published what Jacob Glatshteyn (In tokh genumen [Sum and Substance], 1976, p. 77) has called "the four greatest plays in the Yiddish repertoire": A farvorfn vinkl (A Forsaken Corner; 1912), Di puste kretshme (The Empty [Deserted] Inn; 1913, written in America), Dem shmids tekhter (The Blacksmith's Daughters; 1918) and Grine felder (Green Fields; 1916). In these and other dramas, Hirshbein abandoned symbolism and returned to his rural roots, dramatizing the lives and loves of rural Jews. The understated quality of these works appealed to directors including Maurice Schwartz and Jacob Ben-Ami, and they became regular productions in the repertoire of artistically ambitious Yiddish theaters. His popularity extended to other cultures and genres, and his plays were performed in Russian, Hebrew, English, German, Spanish, and French. Indeed, the 1937 American film Grine felder (Green Fields), based on Hirshbein's play, is among the most beloved of all Yiddish films, and the play continues to be often anthologized and staged.

Hirshbein traveled extensively; in 1911 alone, he visited Vienna, Paris, London, and New York City. For a while in 1912, he tried farming in New York's Catskills (later, home to the Borscht Belt); he then returned briefly to Russia, and went from there to Argentina for another attempt at farming, this time in a Jewish agricultural colony. At the start of World War I he was en route to New York on a British ship, which was sunk by a German cruiser. He was briefly taken captive, then let off in Brazil, from where he eventually reached New York. He spent the succeeding decades traveling, accompanied by his wife,

== Personal life ==
In 1918, Hirschbein met his future wife Esther Shumiatcher-Hirschbein, a Yiddish-language poet and playwright, whilst on tour in Calgary. On 11 December 1918, Hirschbein married Shumiatcher-Hirschbein (Note: Shumiatcher-Hirschbein's name is listed as "Ethel Smith" on the marriage index. The Shumiatche family emigrated from Homyel, Gomel Governorate (present-day Belarus) to Calgary, Alberta in 1911 and adopted the surname "Smith", with Shumiatcher-Hirschbein anglicizing her first name to "Ethel".) with whom he later had the classical music impresario Omus Hirschbein.

Hirschbein died August 16, 1948, in Los Angeles from ALS.

== Works ==
Yiddish-language plays, unless otherwise noted.

- Miriam (a.k.a. Downhill, 1905, in Hebrew)
- Oif Yener Zeit Taikh (On the Other Side of the River, 1906)
- Die Erd (Earth, 1907)
- Tkias Kaf (Contract, a.k.a. The Agreement 1907)
- Oifn Shaidveg (Parting of the Ways, 1907)
- Neveyle (Carcass, 1908)
- Die Puste Kretshme (The Haunted Inn, 1912)
- A farvorfen Vinkel (A Neglected Nook or A Hidden Corner, 1912)
- Griene Felder (Green Fields, 1916)
- Dem Schmids Tekhter (The Smith's Daughters, 1918 or earlier)
- Where Life Ends
- Joel
- The Last One
- The Infamous
- A Lima Bean
- Roite Felder (Red Fields, 1935, novel)
- Hitler's Madman (screenplay for 1943 English-language film, the American debut of director Douglas Sirk)
