= Battle of Radymno =

- Part of the Eastern Front of the First World War
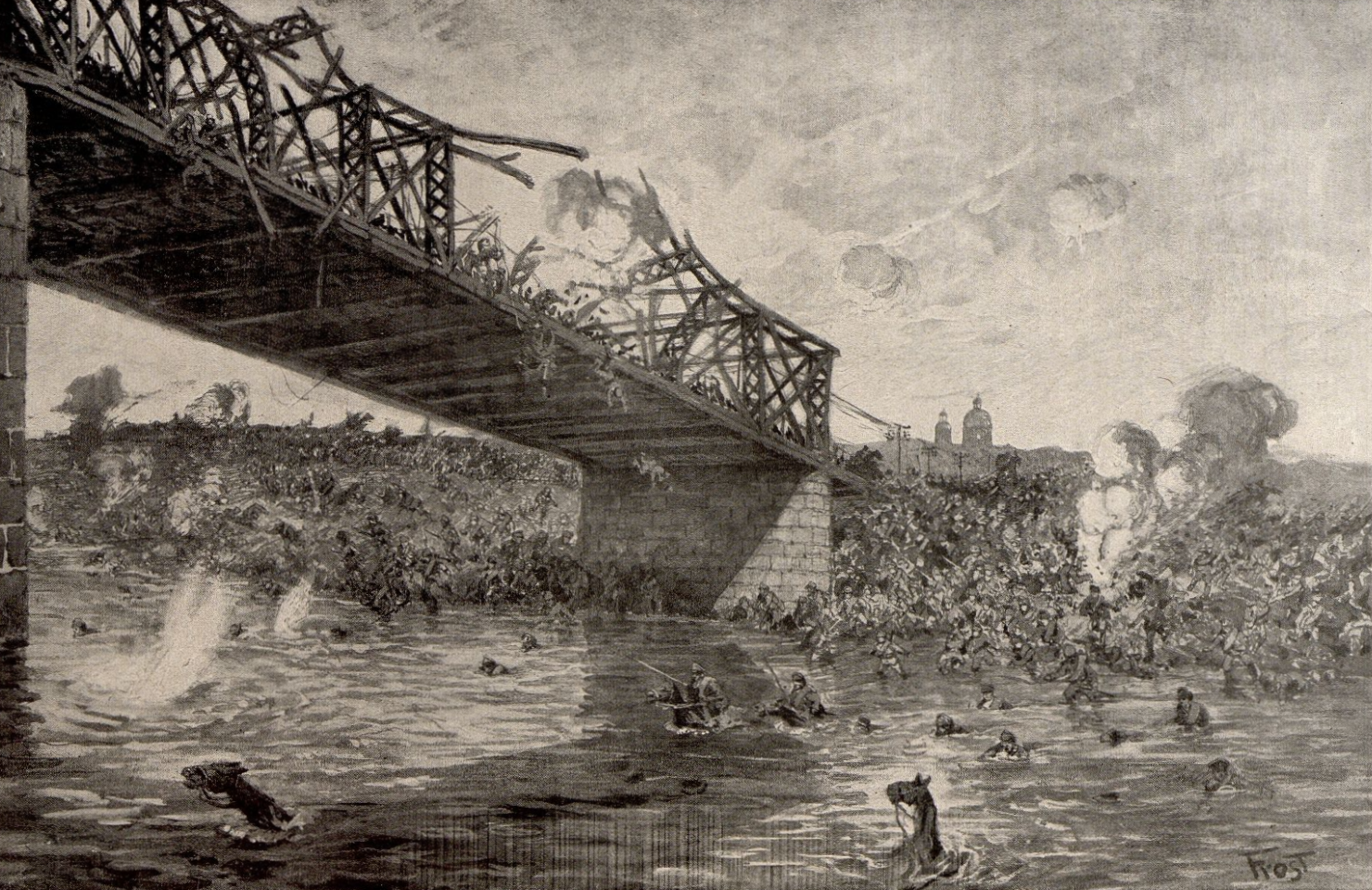
- A 1915 illustration depicting the battle.
Date	23–25 May 1915
Location	Radymno, Kingdom of Galicia and Lodomeria, Austria-Hungary (now part of Poland)
Result	German victory

Belligerents
German Empire	Russian Empire

Commanders and leaders
(German Empire) August von Mackensen	Leonid Lesh

Units involved
11th Army	3rd Army

The Battle of Radymno (Polish: [raˈdɘ̟.mnɔ]) was fought from 23 to 25 May 1915, during the First World War, in Radymno, Kingdom of Galicia and Lodomeria, Austria-Hungary (now part of Poland), between the Russian 3rd Army, led by infantry general Leonid Lesh, and the German 11th Army, led by general August von Mackensen. It resulted in the German victory, and a large devastation of Radymno.

== History ==
Following the beginning of the First World War, from 2 to 23 August 1914, the barracks in Radymno, then in the Kingdom of Galicia and Lodomeria, housed the headquarters the 4th Army of Austria-Hungary, commanded by Moritz von Auffenberg. Additionally, at the nearby fields were also stationed the 8th Aviation Company.

On 20 September 1914, following long skirmishes between Austria-Hungary and Russia for the beachhead on the road and railroad bridges on the San, and following their destruction, the Austro-Hungarian company tasked with their defence, commanded by major Szabo, retreated to Przemyśl.

Following a short presence of Russian troops in Radymno, from 23 to 25 May 1915 a battle was fought, between the Russian 3rd Army, led by infantry general Leonid Lesh, and the German 11th Army, led by general August von Mackensen. It resulted in the German victory, and a large devastation of Radymno.
