= Melech Ravitch =

Canadian writer (1893–1976)

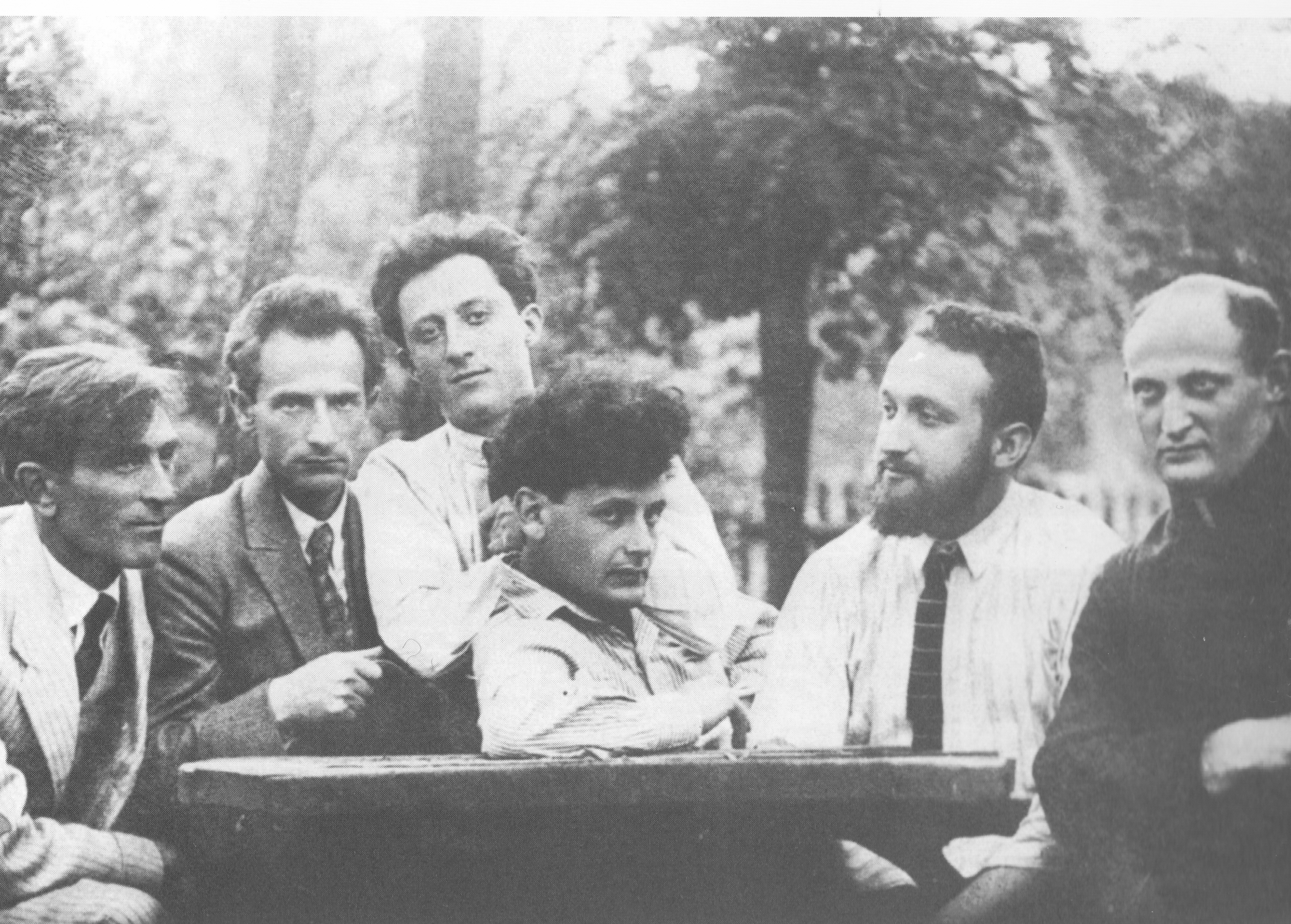
- Melech Ravitch (second from right), with Mendl Elkin, Peretz Hirschbein, Uri Zvi Greenberg, Peretz Markish and I. J. Singer in 1922.
- Born: Zechariah Choneh Bergner; 27 November 1893; Redem, Galicia, Austria-Hungary
- Died: 20 August 1976 (aged 82); Montreal, Quebec, Canada
- Occupations: Writer, literary scholar, poet, historian of literature
- Spouses: Fanya Hartstein; Rachel Eisenberg
- Children: Yosl Bergner (son)
- Relatives: Herz Bergner (brother)
- Writing career
- Language: Yiddish
- Notable works: Di Lider fun mayne lider ('The Poems of My Poems', 1954)

Zechariah Choneh Bergner (Yiddish: זכריה חנא בערגנער, romanized: Zekharye Khone Bergner; 27 November 1893 – 20 August 1976), better known by his pen name Melech Ravitch (Yiddish: מלך ראַוויטש), was a Yiddish poet and essayist. Ravitch was one of the world's leading Yiddish literary figures both before and after the Holocaust. His poetry and essays appeared in the international Yiddish press and in anthologies, as well as in translation.

== Life ==
=== Life in Poland ===
Bergner was born in 1893 to Efrayim and Hinde Bergner in Radymno, Eastern Galicia. Leaving home at age 14, he served in the Austrian army in World War I and lived in Lemberg and Vienna. Emboldened by the 1908 Czernowitz Language Conference, he became involved in the Yiddishist movement and began writing poetry. Together with a fellow poet Shmuel Yankev Imber, he strove to promote the aesthetic ideals of neo-romanticism in Lviv Jewish literary centres, inspired by Jewish writers such as Arthur Schnitzler and Stefan Zweig. His earliest poetry appeared in Der yidisher arbeyter in 1910. Other work of the period included the 1912 collection Oyf der Shvel (On the Threshold) and 1918's Spinoza.

From the early 1920s he was an active contributor of poems and essays to major Yiddish periodicals, under the name Melech Ravitch. Moving to Warsaw in 1921, he belonged to Di Chaliastre ("The Gang"), a modernist literary group which included Uri Zvi Greenberg and Peretz Markish. He was a co-founder of the Yiddish literary journal Literarishe Bleter and served as secretary of the Yiddish Writers' Union, which then included Sholem Asch, Isaac Bashevis Singer, and I. J. Singer.

He was a vegetarian and patron of the Jewish Vegetarian Society.

=== Life in Australia and Canada ===
Ravitch visited Australia in 1933 to raise funds for the Tsentrale Yidishe Shul Organizatsye (TSYSHO), an organisation of Yiddish schools in Poland, and to investigate the feasibility of resettling European Jewish refugees in the Northern Territory. In 1935 he moved to Melbourne, where he edited the First Australian Jewish Almanac and helped establish the city's first Yiddish school, of which he served as headmaster.

After 1938, he moved to Argentina, Mexico, New York City, and Israel, before settling in Montreal, where he lived until his death. He briefly served as head of the Jewish Public Library and revived the Yidishe Folks-Universitet (Jewish People's Popular University), which he ran from 1941 to 1954.

== Selected publications ==
- Oyf der shvel. Lemberg: Sh. Levin. 1912.
- Roinengroz. 1917.
- Spinoza. 1918.
- S. S. Frug. Vienna: Der kval. 1920.
- Gegen dem kritik Dovid Aynhorn [Against the Critic David Einhorn]. 1920.
- Nakete lider [Naked Songs]. Vienna: Der kval. 1921.
- Der kern fun ale mayne lider. Warsaw: Di tsayt. 1922.
- Blut oyf der fon. Vilna: B. Kletskin. 1929.
- Di fir zaytn fun mayn velt [The Four Sides of My World]. Warsaw: B. Kletskin. 1929.
- Vayb un man: dray familyen drames [Wife and Husband: Three Family Dramas]. Warsaw: B. Kletskin. 1931.
- Kontinentn un okeanen [Continents and Oceans]. Warsaw: Literarishe bleter. 1937.
- Lider un baladn fun di letsṭe dray-fir yor [Songs and Ballads from the Past Three to Four Years]. Mexico: Der veg. 1940.
- Mayn leksikon [My Lexicon]. 1945–1982.
- 67 lirishe, satirishe, natsyonale, sotsyale un filozofishe lider fun di letste finf-zeks yor. 1946.
- Eynems Yidishe makhshoves in tsvantsikstn yorhundert [Jewish Thought in the Twentieth Century]. Buenos Aires: David Lerman. 1949.
- Di kroynung fun a yungn Yidishn dikhter in Amerike. 1953.
- Di lider fun mayne lider. Montreal: Yidisher folks bibliyotek. 1954.
- Dos mayse-bukh fun mayn lebn [The Storybook of My Life]. Tel Aviv: I. L. Peretz Publishing House. 1962–1975. ISBN 9780657002886.
- Iker shokhakhti: lider un poemes fun di yorn 1954–1969. Montreal: Yidisher folks bibliyotek. 1969.
- Eseyen [Essays]. Jerusalem: Nes. 1992.
- Night Prayer and Other Poems. Translated by Mayne, Seymour; Augenfeld, Rivka. Oakville: Mosaic Press. 1993. ISBN 9780889625631.
