= Between Sky and Sea =

Novel by Herz Bergner

Between Sea and Sky
- First English edition
- Author: Herz Bergner
- Original title: Zwishn Himl un Waser
- Translator: Judah Waten
- Language: English
- Genre: Novel
- Publisher: Dolphin Publications
- Publication date: 1946
- Publication place: Australia
- Media type: Print
- Pages: 169 pp.

Between Sky and Sea is a novel by Polish-born Australian writer Herz Bergner.

The novel was originally published in serial form in Jewish Youth magazine between August and October 1946. It was then published in 1946 by Dolphin Publications, translated from Yiddish to English by Judah Waten. This Dolphin Publications edition contained a foreword by Vance Palmer and illustrations by V. G. O'Connor.

== Synopsis ==
The novel concerns a group of Jewish refugees sailing for Australia on a dilapidated Greek tramp steamer just before World War II. Conditions on board the ship are terrible and are made even worse when a typhus outbreak occurs.

== Publication history ==
After the novel's initial serialisation in Yiddish, and then translation for the Dolphin Publication's edition in 1946 it was later republished as follows:

- Text Publishing, 2010
- Text Publishing, 2016

== Critical reception ==
Writing about the 2010 edition in Australian Book review reviewer Richard Freadman hailed "Bergner’s mastery of narrative point of view" which enabled him to bring "his characters so vividly to life while at the same time tracking the group’s fragile dynamics, its oscillating moods and shifting patterns of conflict and alignment."

In his review of the same edition in The Weekend Australian Alan Gold found it to be "Beautifully written with extraordinary insight into the frailties of humanity".

== Award ==
The novel received the Australian Literature Society Gold Medal in 1948.

== Notes ==
- Arnold Zable wrote a foreword to the 2010 Text Publishing edition. An excerpt of this foreword was published by The Age.
