= Kastuś Akuła =

Belarusian writer

Kastuś Akuła (Belarusian: Кастусь Акула, November 16, 1925 - January 29, 2008) was a Belarusian writer. After serving in the military during World War II, in 1947 he moved to Canada, where he was one of the founders of the Belarusian Canadian Alliance, and its first chairman. He was a prolific contributor to the magazine Zvažaj!. His first work of prose, Zmaharnyja darohi, reveals an insight into Belarusian life during World War II. In the Belarusian Soviet Socialist Republic, the publication of his works was banned: many Belarusian Soviet writers wrote open letters against him, calling him “an agent of the CIA,” “paid liberator of Belarus,” and “crazy anti-Soviet.” During the Expo 67 exhibition in Montreal, Kastus organized a protest against the USSR, starting to shout anti-Soviet slogans and scatter brochures. This was noted by Alexei Kosygin, and the police soon detained him. In 1992, he visited his historical homeland for the first time, but after 1995 his books again ceased to be published.

He died on January 29, 2008, in Toronto.

== See also ==
=== Archives ===
There is a Kastus Akula fonds at Library and Archives Canada. The archival reference number is R4885.
