= Audrey Bergner =

Australian-born Israeli artist (1927–2022)

Audrey Bergner אודרי בֶּרגנֶר
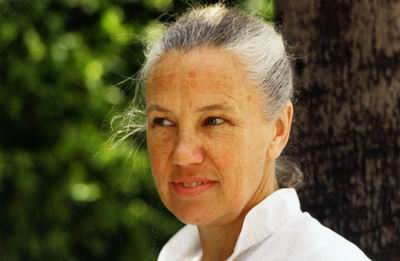
- Audrey Bergner, 2005
- Born: 1927; Sydney, New South Wales, Australia
- Education: National Gallery of Victoria Art School Melbourne, Victoria, Australia
- Known for: Painting
- Movement: Israeli art

Audrey Bergner (Hebrew: אודרי בֶּרגנֶר; May 1927 - 9 May 2022) was an Australian-born Israeli artist.

== Biography ==
Audrey Bergner was born in Sydney and grew up in Melbourne. In 1950, she immigrated to Israel with her partner, the artist Yosl Bergner. They initially settled in Kibbutz Gvat, but left the kibbutz for Tel Aviv. After her marriage to Bergner, they moved to Safed. In the 1960s, they returned to Tel Aviv.

Bergner's themes are nature and Israel's Bedouin minority. She has illustrated books and created theater backdrops and costumes for a number of plays, among them Itzik Manger's Megilla Lieder (1965) and Hanoch Levin's Neurei Vardaleh (1974). She worked with playwright and theater director Nissim Aloni on Doda Liza (1969), performed by Habima, and Sa'ir Ehad La'azazel (1973) and Tzayia Yatza Latzud Batzad (1979), mounted by the Cameri Theater. Bergner lived in Tel Aviv-Yafo. She died on 9 May 2022 and was buried in Kibbutz Einat cemetery.

Audrey Bergner's works can be found in public spaces including "Characters in the Desert" from 1983, displayed on Mount Scopus Campus while another of the series is displayed in the General Reading Room of the National Library in Jerusalem.

== Gallery ==
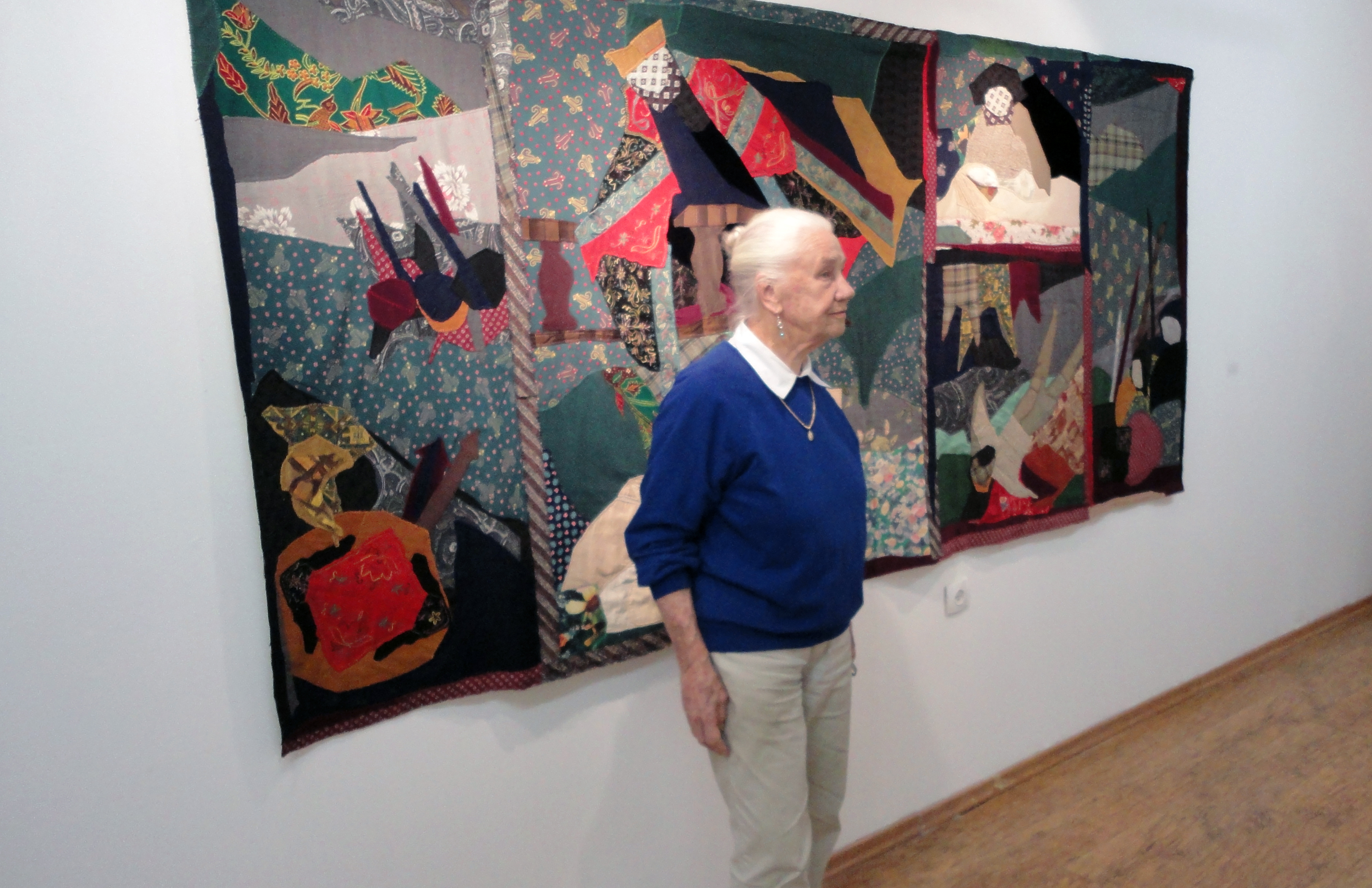
Bergner in the exhibition "Carpets and Shells" (2013)

== Education ==
- 1943–1948 National Gallery of Victoria Art School, Melbourne, Australia.

== Solo exhibitions ==
- 1949 The Assembly Hall, Melbourne, Australia
- 1952 Katz Gallery, Tel Aviv-Yafo
- 1956 Bezalel National Museum, Jerusalem
- 1956 Museum of Modern Art, Haifa
- 1963 Beit Zvi, Ramat Gan
- 1966 Bineth Gallery, Jerusalem
- 1967 Negev Museum, Jerusalem
- 1969 Bineth Gallery, Jerusalem
- 1971 Zuri Gallery, Neve Magen
- 1976 Givon Fine Art, Tel Aviv-Yafo
- 1979 Asaf Gallery, Tel Aviv-Yafo
- 1980 Watercolors, Gordon Gallery, Tel Aviv-Yafo
- 1982 Paintings 1980–82, Gordon Gallery, Tel Aviv-Yafo
- 1984 Travel Notes, Zvi Noam Gallery, Tel Aviv-Yafo
- 1985 Watercolors, Armadale Galleries, Melbourne, Australia
- 1987 Paintings, Gould Galleries, Melbourne, Australia
- 1988 Dvir Gallery, Tel Aviv-Yafo
- 1989 Ayers Rock, Contemporary Art Gallery, Melbourne, Australia
- 1990 Ayers Rock, Ephrat Gallery, Tel Aviv-Yafo
- 1993 Deserts, Contemporary Art Gallery, Melbourne, Australia
- 1996 People Walking, Gordon Gallery, Tel Aviv-Yafo
- 1996 "People Walking, Helengory Gallery, Melbourne, Australia
- 2001 Time and the Thylacine, Span Galleries, Melbourne, Australia
- 2003 Time and the Thylacine, Dan Gallery, Tel Aviv-Yafo
- 2004 Birds, Span Galleries, Melbourne, Australia
- 2007 Birds, Bernard Gallery, Tel Aviv-Yafo
- 2013 Tall tales and Carpets and Shells, Hanina Contemporary Art, Tel Aviv-Yafo

== See also ==
- Visual arts in Israel
