= Herz Bergner =

Novelist (1907–1970)

- Born: 1907; Radymno, Austria-Hungary
- Died: 1970 (aged 62–63); Melbourne, Australia
- Occupation: writer
- Writing career
- Language: Yiddish/English
- Years active: 1928–1966
- Notable works: Between Sky and Sea
- Notable awards: ALS Gold Medal

Herz Bergner (1907–1970) was a novelist who was born in Radymno, Kingdom of Galicia and Lodomeria in 1907. His family moved to Vienna, Austria, at the start of World War I, and returned to Poland at the end of the war. Bergner's brother, Melech Ravitch, a Yiddish writer, emigrated to Australia in 1933. Herz Bergner followed him in 1938, originally to raise funds for Jewish secular schools in Poland. Once in Australia Bergner met Pinchus Goldhar and other Yiddish writers and, together with Abraham Schulman and Goldhar, began the literary publication Oyfboy which was published in Melbourne.

In 1948 Bergner was awarded the ALS Gold Medal for his novel Between Sky and Sea.

Herz Bergner died in 1970.

== Bibliography ==
=== Novels ===
- Between Sky and Sea (1946)
- A shtot in poyln (A City in Poland, 1950)
- Light and Shadow (1963)

=== Short story collections ===
- Shtubn un gasn (Homes and Streets, 1935)
- The New House (1941)
- Dos hoyz fun dzheykob ayziks (The House of Jacob Isaacs, 1955)
- Where the Truth Lies (1966)
- M’darf zayn a mentsh, dertseylungen (One must be a good person, 1971)

== Awards ==
- 1948 winner ALS Gold Medal – Between Sky and Sea
