= Amelia Bergner =

American photographer

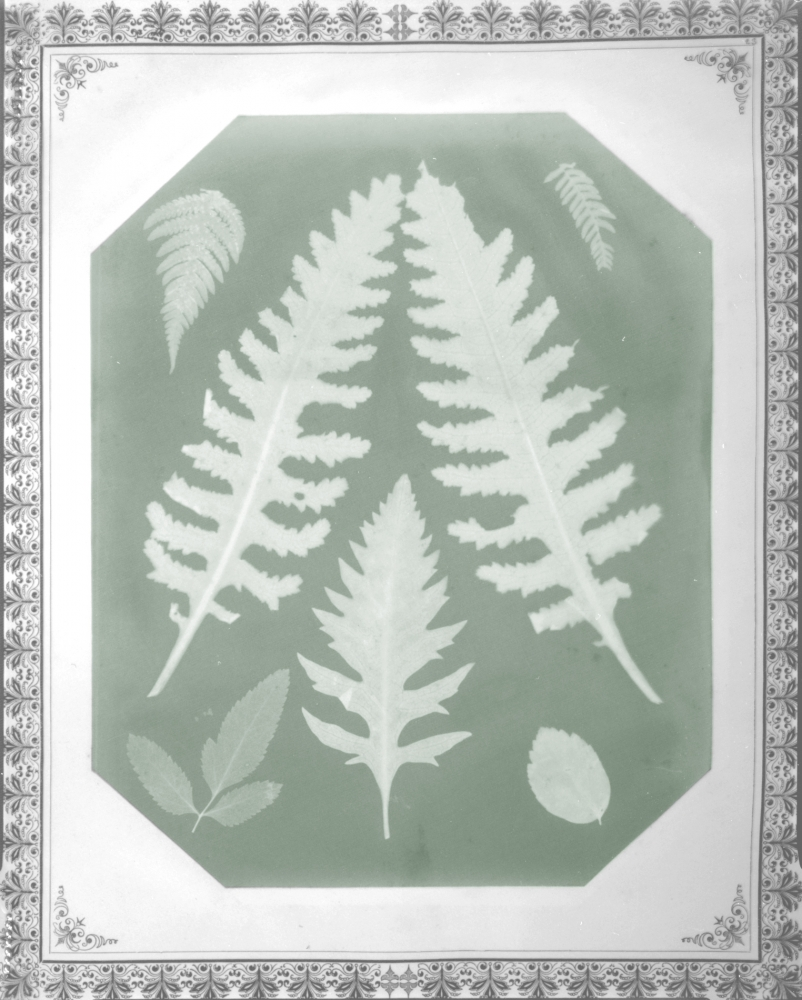
Seven Botanical specimens, 1877 photogram by Amelia Bergner.

Amelia Bergner (1853–1923) was an American photographer. Bergner is known for her photograms of leaves and botanical subjects, created in the 1870s.

Her work is included in the collections of the Musée d'Orsay in Paris, the Raclin Murphy Museum of Art] in South Bend, the Museum of Fine Arts Houston, the Art Institute of Chicago, the San Francisco Museum of Modern Art, the Philadelphia Museum of Art, and the Nelson-Atkins Museum of Art in Kansas City.
