= Steel and Iron =

1927 novel by Israel Joshua Singer

Shtol un Ayzn (שטאָל און אײַזן) is a 1927 Yiddish language novel by Polish-Jewish novelist Israel Joshua Singer. The plot follows the travels of Benjamin Lerner, a deserter from the Imperial Russian Army, in the Kingdom of Poland and Russia immediately before the outbreak of the Russian Revolution. It was translated into English as Blood Harvest in 1935, and re-translated as Steel and Iron in 1969.
