= Yosl Bergner =

Israeli painter

Yosl Bergner יוסל ברגנר
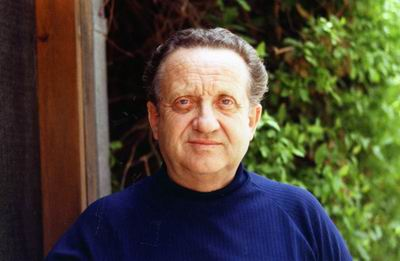
- Born: 13 October 1920; Vienna, Austria
- Died: 18 January 2017 (aged 96); Tel Aviv, Israel
- Known for: Painting, drawing

Yosl Bergner (Hebrew: יוסל ברגנר; 13 October 1920 – 18 January 2017), also known as Josl, was an Israeli painter. He was born in Vienna, Austria, grew up in Warsaw, Poland, lived in Melbourne, Australia from 1937 until 1948, when he moved to Israel.

== Biography ==
Yosl Bergner was born in Vienna, Austria, in 1920 and grew up in Warsaw, Poland.

With rampant anti-Semitism in Europe, the Freeland League for Jewish Territorial Colonization was formed in the United States in July 1935, to search for a potential Jewish homeland. Soon afterwards a pastoral firm in Australia offered the League about 16,500 square kilometres (6,400 sq mi) in the Kimberleys, stretching from the north of Western Australia into the Northern Territory. As history showed, the plans went nowhere. But for a time, the Australian idea was at least worth considering. Bergner's father, Melech Ravitch, became involved in a serious investigation of the Kimberley Plan.

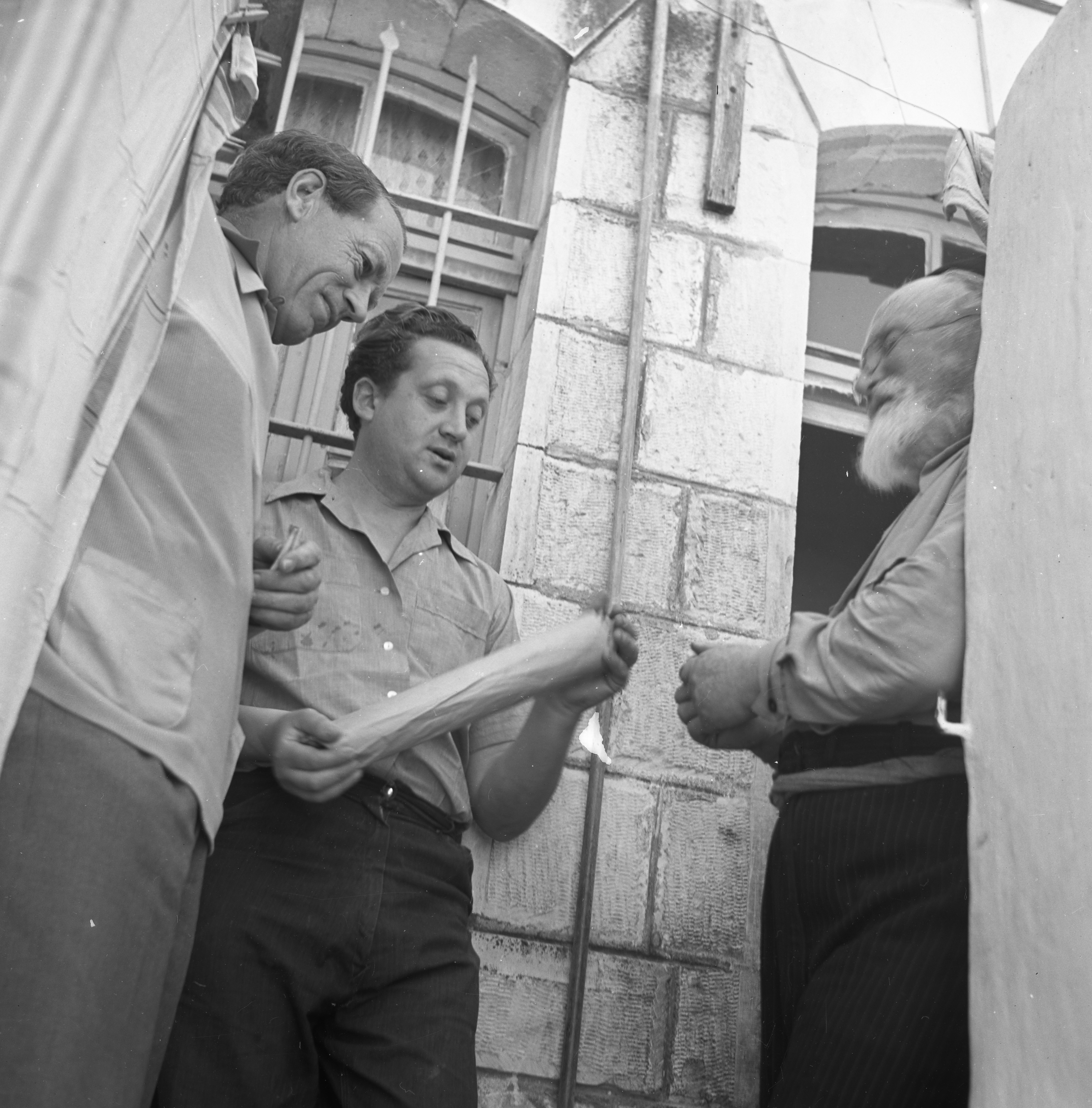
Yosl Bergner in Safed's artists quarter

In this way the Bergner family moved to Australia. Yosl emigrated to Australia in 1937 and studied in the National Gallery School in Melbourne until the outbreak of World War II. He served for four and a half years in the Australian Army, and later continued his studies at the Art School.

In Melbourne from 1937–48, Bergner befriended many of the local artists who now epitomize modern 20th century Australian art: Sidney Nolan, Albert Tucker, John Perceval and Arthur Boyd. Adrian Lawlor moved with his wife to a cottage at Warrandyte, an outer suburb of Melbourne, where they lived for 30 years. Bergner was a frequent visitor at their Warrandyte home. All the men socialized together. Bergner encouraged them to go beyond their traditional landscape style and introduced a more radical concern for working families, thus having an important impact on Australian art.

Bergner may not have been prepared for the plight of many struggling Australians. Yet he felt a strong connection between the suffering of people everywhere, whether they were the Jews that he remembered from Europe, landless blacks in the heart of Australia or hungry children in inner urban Melbourne.

He left Australia in 1948 and after two years of travelling and exhibiting in Paris, Montreal and New York City, he settled in Israel. He lived in Safed, where he encouraged and befriended artist Shalom Moskovitz. In 1957, he moved to Tel Aviv with his wife, the artist Audrey Bergner.

== Works ==
Bergner designed scenery and costumes for the Yiddish and Hebrew theatres, particularly for the plays of Nisim Aloni, and has illustrated many books. The acme of Bergner's paintings is his allegorical works; he uses kitchen tools such as squashed pots, oil lamps, wrecks and cracked jugs and he anthropomorphizes them. These old instruments symbolize distorted and poor world of wars, secrets and darkness. one of his student was Nurit Shany, a painter and a multidisciplinary Israeli artist.

== Awards ==
- In 1956, Bergner was a co-recipient of the Dizengoff Prize for painting.
- In 1980, he was awarded the Israel Prize for painting (with Anna Ticho and Pinchas Litvinovsky).

== See also ==
- Painting the Town. Documentary film about Bergner
- List of Israel Prize recipients
