= Ola Schubert =

Swedish Flash animator (born 1972)

Ola Schubert (formerly Ola Bergner; born 19 March 1972 in Täby) is a Swedish Flash animator whose films have won awards in film festivals and on popular internet sites such as Newgrounds and FWA. In 2019 he lost a copyright suit against the Hatten company over the design for the babblers and was ordered to pay 2.5 million Swedish kronor.

== Filmography ==
- 1999—A Christmas Tale
- 2000—A Winter Story
- 2001—Gooberstory
- 2002—Nim's Winter Tale
- 2005—Sumo the Bamboo Man
- 2007—Captain Flame
- 2014— Bath House, co-animator with Johanna Schubert and Niki Lindroth von Bahr

== Awards ==
- 2002—2nd place Jury Award in the Linear Category at Flash Award 2002 for Gooberstory
- 2003 (28 May)—Nim's Winter Tale wins Favorite Website Awards
- 2003 (7 June)—Gooberstory wins FWA One award
- 2003 (10 July)—Gooberstory wins the Story category in Flashforward 2003 in New York; Nim's Winter Tale is nominated.

== See also ==
- Flash cartoon
