= Radymno =

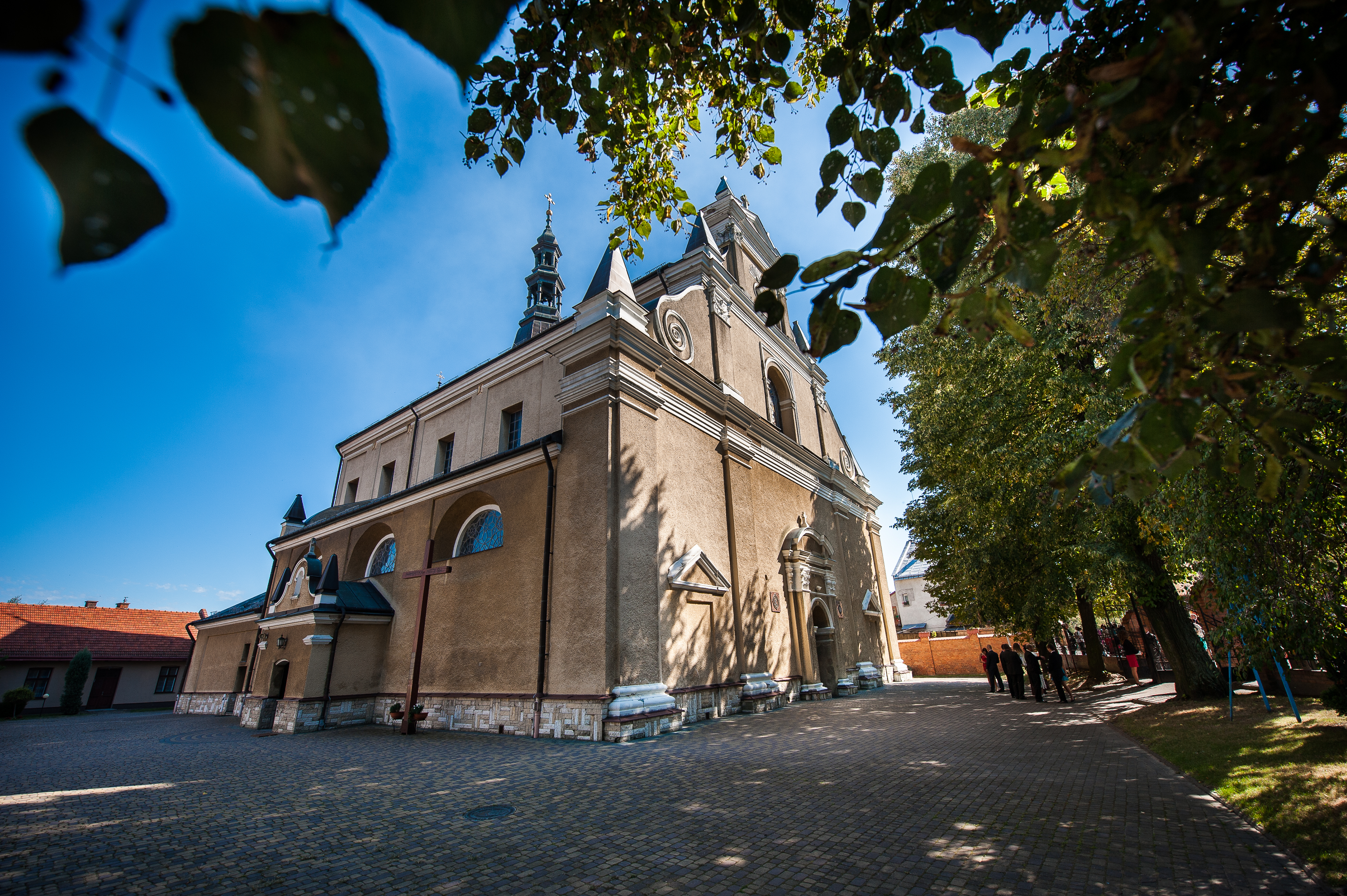
- Church of Saint Lawrence

- Coat of arms

- Location within Poland
- Coordinates: 49°57′0″N 22°48′59″E
- Country: Poland
- Voivodeship: Subcarpathian
- County: Jarosław
- Gmina: Radymno (urban gmina)
- Founded: 1366
- Town rights: 1431

Government
  - Mayor: Mieczysław Piziurny (Ind.)

Area
  - Total: 13.59 km^{2} (5.25 sq mi)
- Elevation: 202.5 m (664 ft)

Population (2013)
  - Total: 5,501
  - Density: 404.8/km^{2} (1,048/sq mi)
- Time zone: UTC+1 (CET)
  - Summer (DST): UTC+2 (CEST)
- Postal code: 37-550
- Car plates: RJA
- Website: http://www.radymno.pl/

Radymno [raˈdɨmnɔ] (Note: Ukrainian: Ради́мно Radymno, Yiddish: רעדעם Redem) is a town in south-eastern Poland with 5,543 inhabitants (02.06.2009). It has been part of the Podkarpackie Voivodeship since its creation in 1999. Radymno was previously in the Przemyśl Voivodeship between 1975–1998.

== History ==
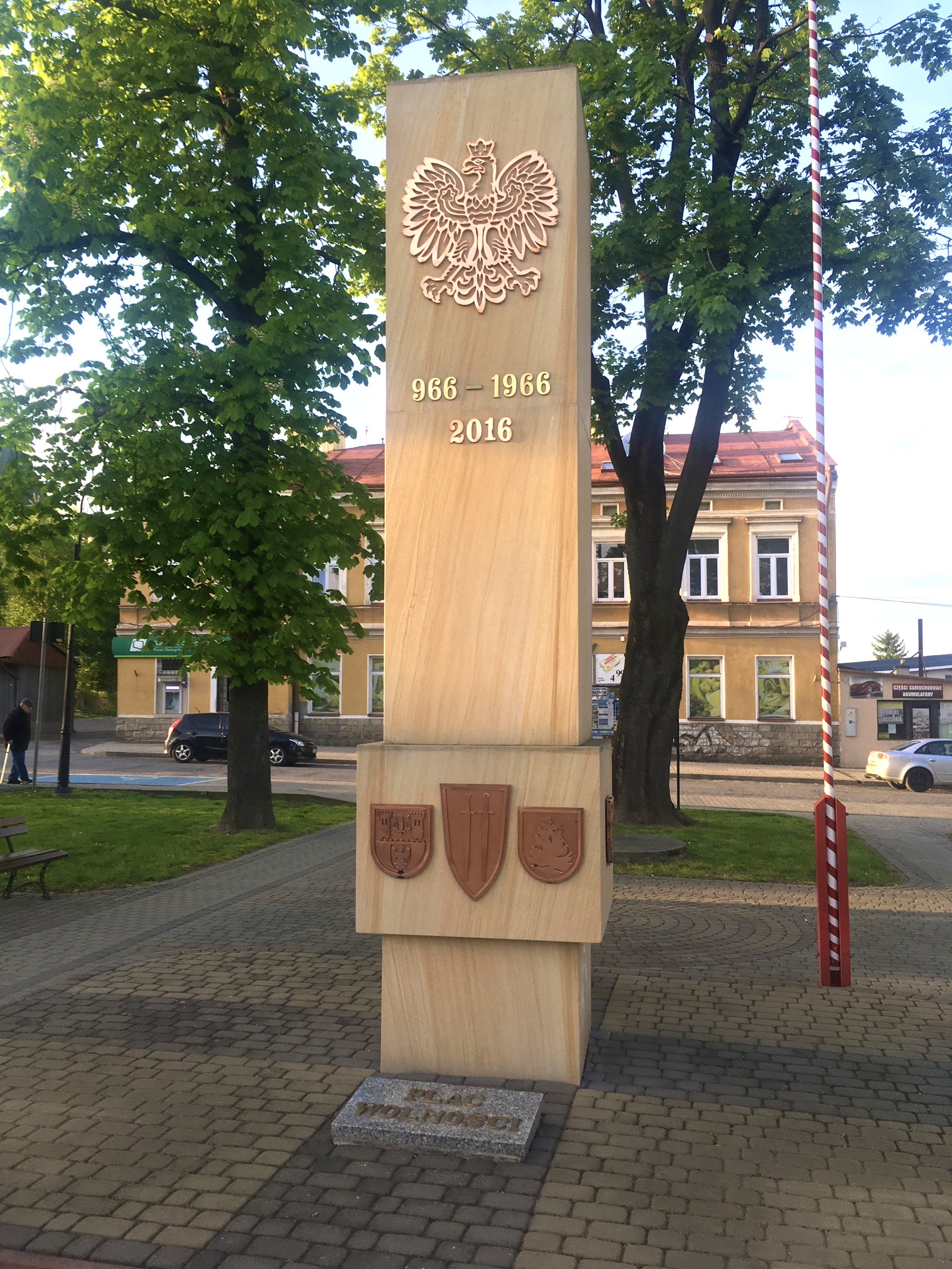
Monument commemorating the thousand-year anniversary of the Baptism of Poland

First traces of human settlement in what today is Radymno date back to the Neolithic times, as in 1958, archaeologists found remains of a 2nd-century settlement. In the early Middle Ages, the area was part of the Polish state ruled by Mieszko I, but in 981, it was seized by Kievan Rus'. The area was then captured and lost by Poland two more times. In the mid-13th century it fell under Mongol suzerainty, and afterwards it was eventually captured by Polish King Casimir III the Great in mid-14th century.

In 1366, a nobleman Bernard of Szynwałd received permission from Casimir III to establish a settlement in the fields. In 1384, Radymno was presented to the Bishops of Przemyśl, and in 1431 King Władysław II Jagiełło gave town charter to the village. Due to its location by the San, and along a busy merchant route, Radymno was an important trade and market center. The town, however, was looted by Wallachians (1488) and Crimean Tatars (1502, 1624). Furthermore, it burned in fires (1603, 1638, 1647). To protect it from further raids, Radymno was fortified in 1625, but in 1656 it was captured by Swedes, and in 1657 by Transilvanians during the Swedish invasion of Poland. Swedish wars left Radymno in ruins, and the town for many years did not recover from widespread destruction. In late July 1683, the army of Hetman Stanisław Jan Jabłonowski camped near Radymno, on its way towards Vienna (see Battle of Vienna).

In the second half of the 18th century, before the Partitions of Poland, the population of Radymno was 1200, with 154 houses, three churches, hospital, parish school, two brickyards, and a residence of the Bishops of Przemyśl. In the middle of 18th century, Radymno had a population of 860 Roman Catholics, 196 people of Greek Catholic faith, and 26 Jews.

As a result of the First Partition of Poland (Treaty of St-Petersburg dated 5 July 1772), Radymno was annexed by the Habsburg monarchy. It was part of the Bezirkshauptmannschaft Jaroslau (Jarosław County). It formed part of the newly formed Kingdom of Galicia and Lodomeria (Austrian Partition of Poland), within which it remained until November 1918, when Poland regained independence and control of the town.

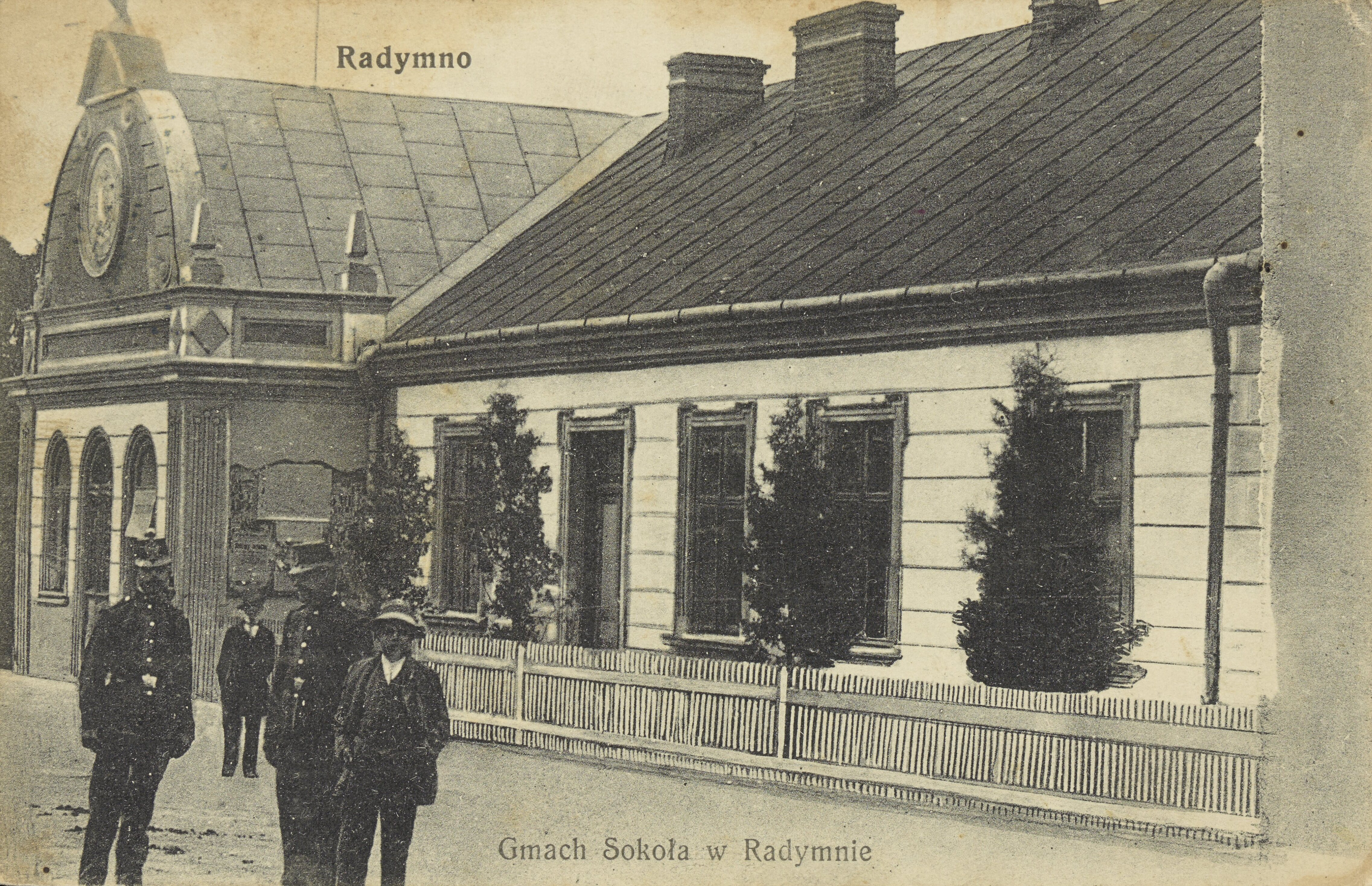
Seat of the local branch of the Sokół Polish Gymnastic Society in 1912

In 1860, Radymno received rail connection with Przemyśl. Austrian government for a while considered construction of a fortress here, but changed their minds and created Przemyśl Fortress instead. In 1857–1867 Radymno was the seat of a county. In the late 19th century, the town had a population of 2,700.

On 24 May 1915, the Battle of Radymno took place between Russian 8th Army of General Aleksei Brusilov, and German-Austrian 8th Army under General August von Mackensen. The town was almost completely destroyed.

In the Second Polish Republic, Radymno belonged to the Jarosław County in the Lwów Voivodeship. According to the 1921 census, it had a population of 1,907, 54.3% Polish and 42.4% Jewish.

=== World War II ===
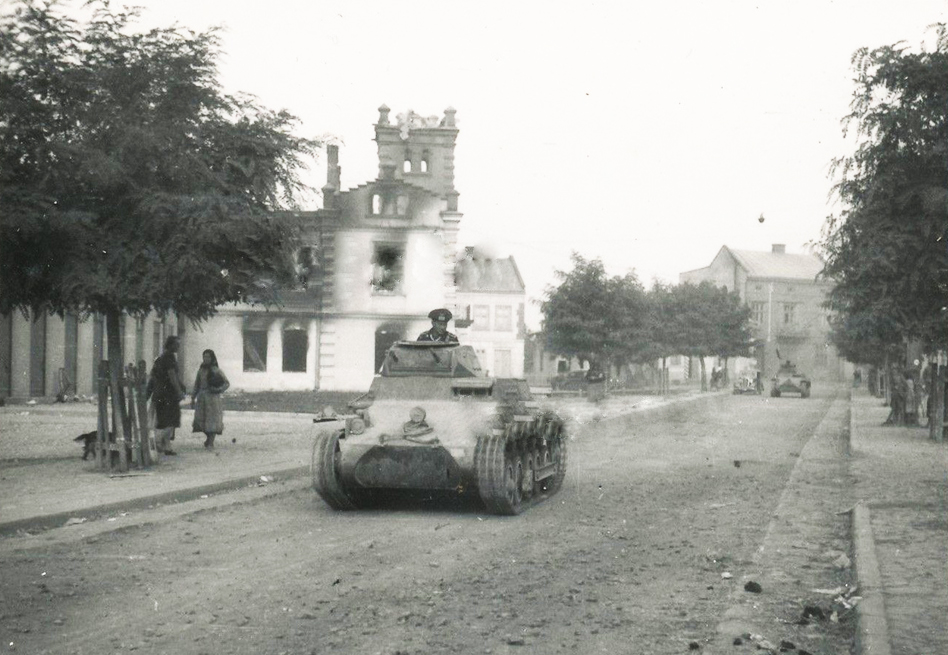
German tanks in Radymno in 1939

On 10 September 1939, during the Invasion of Poland, which started World War II, German 4th Light Division crossed the San here, after a very light resistance and barely any battle with Polish Army's Jarosław Group under Colonel Jan Wójcik, who just escaped to the East as quickly as he could leaving Poland to defend itself. According to the memoir of Dov Hister, during the German invasion of Radymno three Polish Army Youth took out a position in the Council's tower, the Germans blown the tower with one cannon shot and killed and buried the three boys under the tower's rubble.

Radymno fell under German occupation, and the Einsatzgruppe I entered the town to commit various atrocities against the populace. Officers of the local Polish military unit were among the victims of the large Katyn massacre, which was carried out by the Russians in April–May 1940.

During the war, groups of the Organization of Ukrainian Nationalists, which operated in the area, murdered 59 Poles, including 29 killed in the village of Michałówka. Of the estimated 1,200 Jews in Radymno prior to the World War II only a handful survived, many were handed over by the Ukrainian's collaborators to the Germans and their Nazi regime. Some of the Jews were murdered by the Nazis outside the town in September 1939. The Germans operated a forced labour camp for Jews in the town in 1942–1943. The story of the Jewish residents of Radymno is documented in Dov Hister book The Power of Survival.

Radymno was captured by the Red Army on July 26, 1944, after heavy fighting with German armoured units, and afterwards it was restored to Poland.

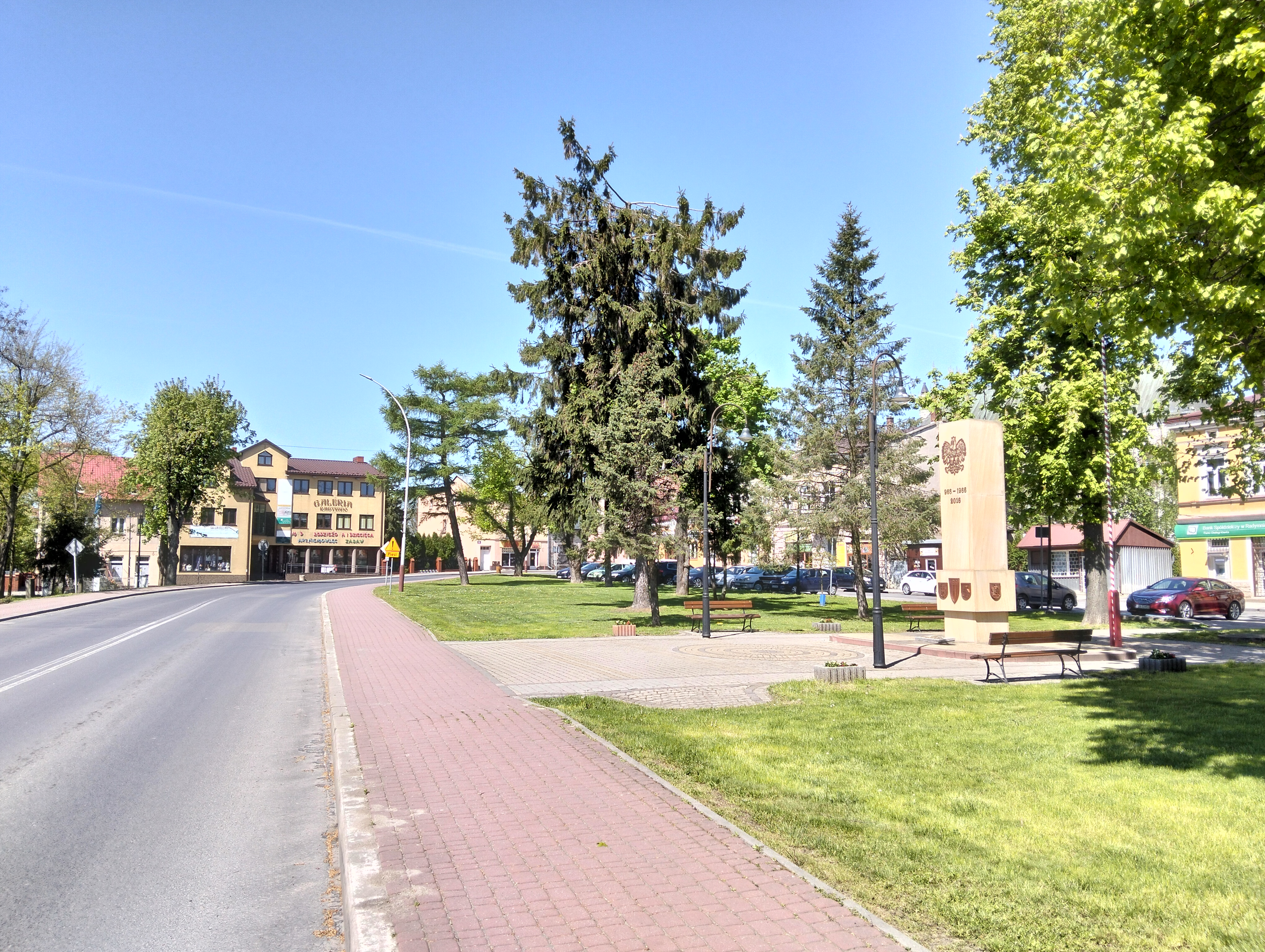
Town square in Radymno

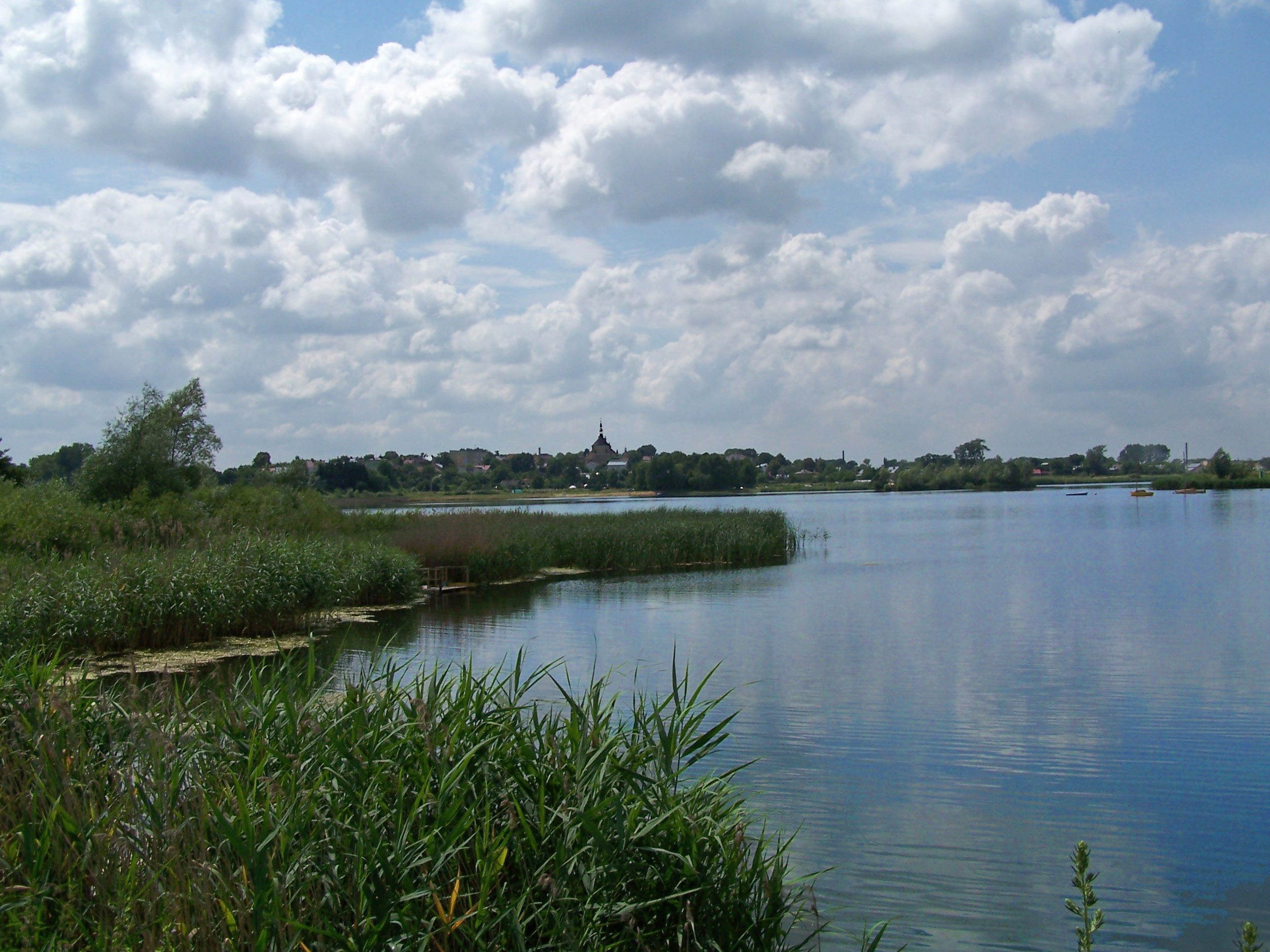
ZEK reservoir
