= Israel Joshua Singer =

Polish-Jewish novelist

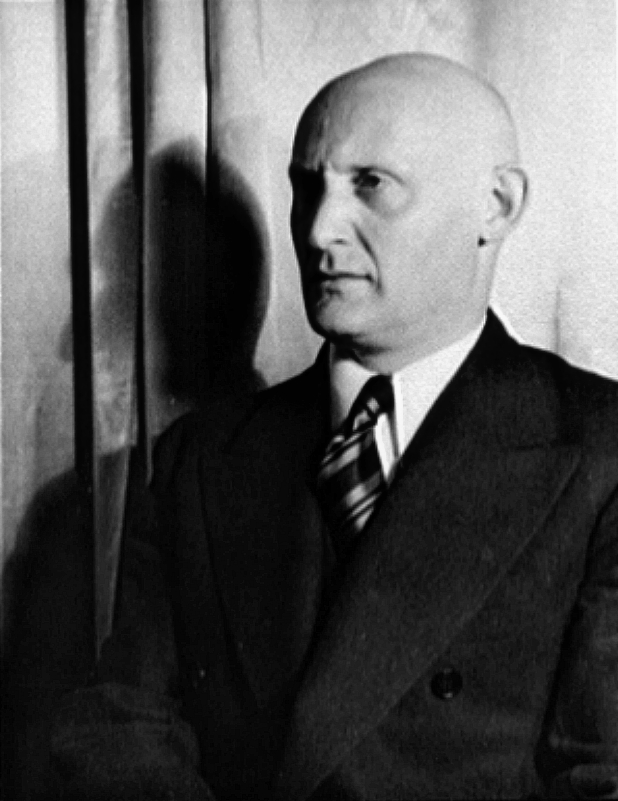
- Israel Joshua Singer photographed by Carl Van Vechten in 1938
- Born: November 30, 1893; Biłgoraj, Congress Poland
- Died: February 10, 1944 (aged 50); New York City, US
- Citizenship: United States
- Occupation: Novelist
- Writing career
- Language: Yiddish
- Genre: fictional prose
- Notable work: The Brothers Ashkenazi

Israel Joshua Singer (Yiddish: ישראל יהושע זינגער; November 30, 1893, Biłgoraj, Lubelskie, Congress Poland — February 10, 1944, Manhattan, New York) was a Polish-Jewish novelist who continued to write in Yiddish after he emigrated in 1934 to the United States with his wife and children. They settled in New York where he also worked for The Forward.

== Biography ==
He was born Yisruel Yehoyshye Zinger, the son of Pinchas Mendl Zynger, a rabbi and author of rabbinic commentaries, and Bas Szewa Zylberman. He was the elder brother of novelist Isaac Bashevis Singer and rabbi Moshe Singer.

The older sister of the brothers married and became known as novelist Esther Kreitman. She and her husband lived in Antwerp until early in the Great War, when they moved to London.

I. J. Singer married Genia Kupferstok. Their eldest son, Yasha, died at 14 of pneumonia before the family emigrsted to America in 1934.

Their younger son, Joseph Singer, became the translator of both his father's works and those of his uncle Isaac Bashevis Singer. Joseph, a painter and writer like his father, married June Flaum, who also became a writer. They had four children: Sharon (Singer) Salinger, Brett Singer, I.J. Singer and Valerie Singer. The three daughters followed in the 'family business' and became published poets and novelists.

Singer contributed to the European Yiddish press from 1916. In 1919, he and his wife Genia went to Ukraine, where he found work on The New Times, and was considered one of the "Kiev Writers". Then they moved to Moscow, where he published articles and stories. After two hard years, in 1921 they returned to Warsaw.

In 1921, after Abraham Cahan noticed his story Pearls, he hired Singer as a correspondent for the American Yiddish newspaper The Forward. Singer's short story Liuk appeared in 1924, illuminating the ideological confusion of the Bolshevik Revolution. He published his first novel, Steel and Iron, in 1927.

In 1934 I.J. Singer emigrated with his family to the United States, where he wrote for The Forward in New York. Eventually, Israel Joshua invited his younger brother, Isaac Bashevis Singer, to New York and arranged a job for him with The Forward. The younger man later won the Nobel Prize for Literature.

"Had it not been for Joshua, Abraham Cahan would have fired him", Genia Singer later told I. B. Singer's son Israel Zamir.

I. J. Singer died of a heart attack at age 50 at his home in New York City, at 258 Riverside Drive, on February 10, 1944.

== Works ==
- Fun a velt vos iz nishto mer (English: Of a World That is No More (1946)). This was published posthumously, with an English translation published by Vanguard Press in 1971.
- Shtol un Ayzn (1927); translated into English as Blood Harvest (1935) and as Steel and Iron (1969)
- Nay Rusland (Eng: New Russia) (1928)
- Yoshe Kalb (1932). Translated as The Sinner, Liveright Pub., NY (1933), and the same translation was published as Yoshe Kalb in 1937. In his introduction to the latter, I. B. Singer called The Sinner "an insipid title".
- The Brothers Ashkenazi (1936)
- Friling (1937)
- East of Eden (originally titled Khaver Nachman) published by Alfred A. Knopf (1939)
- The Family Carnovsky (1969) (originally titled Di mishpokhe Karnovski) (1943)
- The River Breaks Up, stories published by Alfred A. Knopf (1938); republished by Vanguard Press, NY (1966)
- Dertseylungen (English: Stories); published posthumously, 1949

In the introduction to A Treasury of Yiddish Stories, Irving Howe and Eliezer Greenberg stated that Singer's books are organized "in a way that satisfies the usual Western expectations as to literary structure. His novels resemble the kind of family chronicle popular in Europe several decades ago [that is, the turn of the century]".

A translation in Russian by Yisroel Nekrasov: На чужой земле [In the Alien Land], short story collection

== Sources ==
- Norich, Anita (2000). "Singer, Israel Joshua". American National Biography. New York: Oxford University Press.
- Novak, Maximillian (2015). The Writer as Exile: Israel Joshua Singer. New York: AMS. ISBN 978-0-404-67002-3.
