= Shirley Ulmer =

American screenwriter (1914–2000)

Shirley Kassler Ulmer (June 12, 1914 – July 6, 2000) was an American screenwriter.

== Early life ==
Shirley Beatrice Kassler was born in New York in 1914. After her banker father lost his saving in the Wall Street crash of 1929, the family moved to California.

== Career ==
While living in California, Kassler "met picture people" and began working as a script supervisor in Hollywood. She married Max Alexander, nephew of Universal Studios' founder Carl Laemmle, in 1933.

While working on The Black Cat (1934) as a script supervisor, Kassler met Edgar G. Ulmer. The two began a relationship after work on the film finished, and Kassler started divorce proceedings while living with Ulmer in the Hotel Christie on Hollywood Boulevard. The relationship angered Kassler's uncle-in-law, Laemmie. He blacklisted Kassler and Ulmer, preventing either from getting jobs in Hollywood. Kassler's final work on a Hollywood film was Thunder Over Texas (1934), which she wrote, Ulmer directed, and her then-husband, Alexander, produced.

After leaving Hollywood, Kassler and Ulmer married in early 1935, a few months before Kassler's 21st birthday, and moved to New York, where Shirley modeled hats and Edgar worked as a cameraman for Pathé News. The couple went to Canada in 1936, when they were hired by producer William Steiner to film a thriller called From Nine To Nine. The two were paid poorly, making essentially no money after Shirley developed appendicitis and required medical care. Their next project, Natalka Poltavka, was more successful, and Shirley played a small role in the film after an actress no-showed.

While living in New York, the couple were encouraged to make films for the large Yiddish-speaking population there. Their first film, Green Fields (1937), was a success, leading to subsequent films. Shirley Ulmer continue to worked on scripts for her husband's films, including The Light Ahead (1939), American Matchmaker (1940), Girls in Chains (1943), Jive Junction (1943), Strange Illusion (1945), and Detour (1945).

Ulmer also worked as a script supervisor under the name Shirley Castle for directors such as Frank Borzage, Frank Lloyd, Douglas Sirk, and William Wyler. She also worked as a script supervisor for the TV series Batman, CHIPs, The Lone Ranger, and S.W.A.T.

Ulmer co-wrote novels under the name Shirle Castle, and a 1986 book titled The Role of Script Supervision in Film And Television.

Following Edgar Ulmer's death in 1972, Shirley Ulmer became director of the Edgar G Ulmer Preservation Corporation.

== Filmography ==
Year	Film	Role	Ref
1934	I Can't Escape		
1934	The Black Cat	Script supervisor	
1934	Thunder Over Texas	Story, Script supervisor	
1937	Natalka Poltavka	Script supervisor	
1937	Green Fields	Script supervisor	
1939	The Singing Blacksmith	Script supervisor	
1939	Cossacks in Exile	Script supervisor	
1939	Moon Over Harlem	Script writer, supervisor	
1939	The Light Ahead	Script writer	
1940	American Matchmaker	Script writer, supervisor	
1943	Girls in Chains		
1943	Jive Junction		
1945	Detour		
1945	Strange Illusion		
1948	Ruthless	Script supervisor	
1960	The Amazing Transparent Man	Script supervisor	
1960	Beyond the Time Barrier	Script supervisor	
1973	Little Cigars	Script supervisor	
1975	Return to Macon County	Script supervisor	

== Personal life ==
Ulmer had a daughter with her second husband, Edgar Ulmer.

Ulmer died of natural causes in July 2000 in Los Angeles.
