= I Want to Be a Boarder =

- A still of Leo Fuchs parodying Fred Astaire.
- Directed by: Joseph Seiden, George Roland
- Written by: Joseph Seiden
- Produced by: Joseph Seiden
- Starring: Leo Fuchs, Yetta Zwerling
- Distributed by: Jewish Talking Picture Company
- Release date: 1937
- Running time: 15 minutes
- Country: United States
- Language: Yiddish (with English subtitles)

I Want to be a Boarder, or איך ווילן צו זיין אַ באָרדער (Ikh Vil Zayn a Boarder) in Yiddish, is a 1937 American comedy short film starring Leo Fuchs and Yetta Zwerling, excerpted from the Yiddish language feature film American Matchmaker. It is a parody of Hollywood's optimism and grandiose nature, as well as famous Hollywood actors, particularly Fred Astaire.

== Synopsis ==
Chaim (Leo Fuchs) and his wife (Yetta Zwerling) are in a difficult relationship, and cannot decide whether to separate or divorce. Instead, in order to enhance their sex life, they decide to play a game in which Chaim pretends to be a boarder, and the wife to be a landlady. However, when Chaim's wife begins to fall for the "boarder," the game soon gets out of hand.

== Cast ==
- Leo Fuchs as Chaim
- Yetta Zwerling as Chaim's wife
