= Lea Noemi =

American Yiddish actress

Lea Noemi, also known as Lea Eisenberg (1883–1973) was a Yiddish actress, who performed at the Yiddish Art Theater alongside Maurice Schwartz.

== Life ==
Lea Noemi was born on November 10, 1883.

In the 1930s Noemi appeared in two Yiddish films made by Edgar G. Ulmer. She played the role of Gitl in Green Fields (1936), directed by Ulmer with Jacob Ben-Ami, and the role of Mariashe in The Singing Blacksmith (1938), directed by Ulmer alone.

Noemi played the title role in a New York stage production of Mirele Efros. Her New York Times obituarist claimed that she also reprised this role in Josef Berne's' 1939 film adaptation of Mirele Efros, though other sources suggest that Berta Gersten took the title role in the film.

In the 1950s Noemi acted in Deeds and Dreams, an Israeli comedy, in a performance at the New York Jewish Community Center sponsored by the Workmen's Circle.

Noemi married the sculptor Abraham Eisenberg (died 1959). She died on November 6, 1973, at St. Elizabeth's Hospital, New York City.

== Filmography ==
- Green Fields / Grine Felder). 1936.
- The Singing Blacksmith / Yankel der Schmid. 1938.
