= Steel Cowboy =

- Genre: Drama
- Written by: Douglas Wheeler; Bill Kerby
- Directed by: Harvey Laidman
- Starring: James Brolin; Rip Torn; Jennifer Warren; Strother Martin; Melanie Griffith
- Music by: Charles Bernstein; Juice Newton
- Country of origin: United States
- Original language: English

Production
- Executive producers: Tony Converse; Roger Gimbel
- Producer: R.J. Louis
- Cinematography: Frank Holgate
- Editor: Aaron Stell
- Running time: 90 minutes
- Production companies: EMI Films; Roger Gimbel Productions

Original release
- Network: NBC
- Release: December 6, 1978

Steel Cowboy is a 1978 American made-for-television drama film starring James Brolin, Rip Torn, Jennifer Warren, Strother Martin and Melanie Griffith. It was originally broadcast on NBC on December 6, 1978.

== Plot ==
With his marriage, sanity and livelihood on the line, an independent trucker and his buddy agree to haul a load of stolen cattle for a black marketer.

== Cast ==
- James Brolin as Clayton Pfanner
- Rip Torn as K.W. Hicks
- Jennifer Warren as Jesse Pfanner
- Strother Martin as Pinky Pincus
- Melanie Griffith as Johnnie
- Julie Cobb as Gloria

== Reception ==
The Los Angeles Times said the film had some "nice characterizations but precious little story."

It was the 42nd highest rated show of the week.
