= The Swap (1979 film) =

- Directed by: Jordan Leondopoulos (credited as John Shade)
- Written by: John C. Broderick (screenplay)
- Produced by: Christopher C. Dewey
- Starring: Robert De Niro
- Cinematography: Álex Phillips Jr.
- Music by: Bill Conti
- Production company: January Films
- Distributed by: Cannon Films
- Release date: May 7, 1979
- Running time: 83 minutes
- Country: United States
- Language: English

The Swap is a 1979 American neo noir crime film directed by Jordan Leondopoulos. Parts of the film are edited from the 1969 film Sam's Song, also directed by Leondopoulos. The remainder consists of extensive reshootings, the different parts tied together by the use of a voice-over.

The film was retitled Line of Fire for the American home-video release.

== Plot ==
Sam Nicoletti, a film editor, works in his office (Note: In Sam's Song the character played, by De Niro, is working on a documentary about Nixon but here he is working on a pornographic film.) where he is unaware that there is an intruder. After talking on the phone, Sam is rendered unconscious by the intruder.

Ten years later, Sam's brother Vito is being released from prison for an unspecified crime. He becomes determined to learn who killed Sam and why. He visits Erica Moore, a publisher, whom he knows spent time with Sam in his final days. She tells him that her husband had an affair with Carole, a girl Sam whom was dating and ended up marrying Carole. In flashbacks, we learn more about a weekend that Sam spent with rich friends Warren and Mickey.

From a caretaker in the cemetery where Sam is buried, Vito learns that a girl has been visiting Sam's grave for the last ten years. He confronts her when she visits, but she drives away. Tracing her licence plate, he goes to her home, where he reveals that he is Sam's brother. Vivian reveals that she was in Sam's pornographic films. Vito is surprised, for he was unaware of Sam's involvement in that business.

Vito is led to Warren and his wife, who both have reason to prevent the porn film from seeing being released. Vito secures the reel of film and has it processed while Vivian transports him around town. Warren's wife seduces Vito at his hotel, but slips him a mickey, later kidnapping him at gunpoint. Vito grabs her, turns the gun on her, and she is killed.

Vito is also wounded, but he and Vivian watch the porn film and see that Warren is in it. Vivian drives him to Warren's home, where he shoots Warren's houseboy and finds Warren in the bathtub. Warren pleads for his life, but Vito shoots him.

Vivian and Vito drive away. She thinks that they can make it to the mountains where she can find a doctor for him, but he is clearly dying. She tells him that she loves him.

== Cast ==
=== 1969 archive footage scenes ===
- Robert De Niro as Sam Nicoletti
- Jennifer Warren as Erica Moore
- Jarred Mickey as Andrew Moore (as Jerry Micky)
- Terrayne Crawford as Carole Moore
- Martin J. Kelley as Mitch Negroni (as Martin Kelley)
- Phyllis Black as Marge Negroni (uncredited)
- Viva as Girl with the hourglass (uncredited)

=== New Scenes ===
- Anthony Charnota as Vito Nicoletti
- Lisa Blount as Vivian Buck
- Sybil Danning as Erica Moore—first American appearance for the actress; also voice over
- John Medici as Joey
- James Brown as Lt. Benson
- Sam Anderson as Paul
- Tony Brande as Father Testa
- Matt Greene as Marge's Assistant (as Matthew Greene)
- Alvin Hammer as Cemetery Caretaker
- Jack Slater as Party Guest
