= Helen Beverley =

American actress (1916–2011)

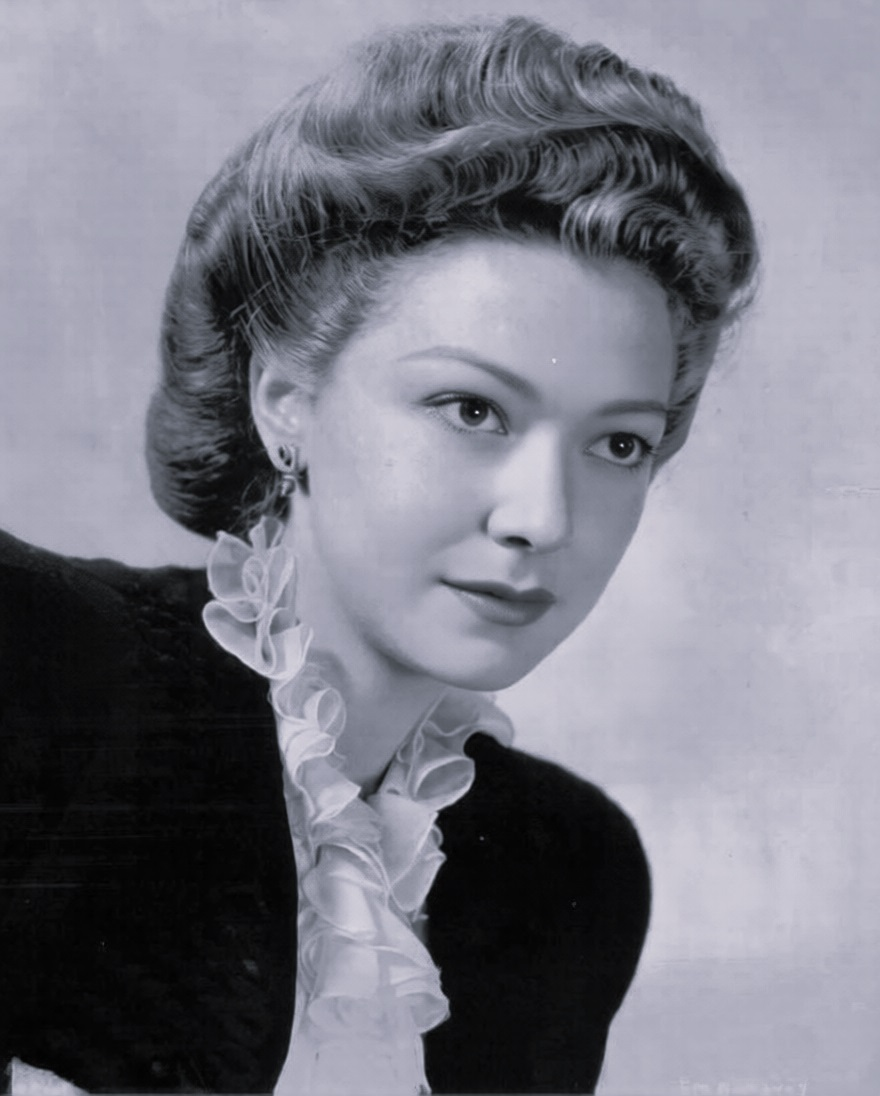
- Beverley in The Master Race (1944)
- Born: Helen Smuckler; November 9, 1916; Boston, Massachusetts, U.S.
- Died: July 15, 2011 (aged 94); Los Angeles, California, U.S.
- Occupation: Actress
- Years active: 1937–1961
- Spouse: Lee J. Cobb (m. 1940; div. 1952)
- Children: 2, including Julie Cobb

Helen Beverley (November 9, 1916 – July 15, 2011) was an American film and stage actress who began her career in Yiddish theater and films. She was sometimes credited as Helen Beverly.

== Early life ==
Beverley was born in Boston, Massachusetts, the daughter of Russian-Jewish immigrants, Anna and Louis Smuckler, both of whom acted in stock theater in Boston. She supplemented the normal education for children by taking classes in drama and by studying dancing with Ruth St. Denis and the Denishawn dancers. She gained early acting experience with the semi-professional Ibsen Players in New York.

== Career ==
Beverley began her career in Yiddish theater and the Yiddish-language films, including a starring role in Peretz Hirshbein's Green Fields in 1937. Screenwriter Hirshbein adapted the film from his 1916 play of the same name and cast Beverley in the lead role. The National Center of Jewish Cinema has praised Green Fields, saying the film "heralded the Golden Age of Yiddish cinema."

She next starred in The Light Ahead, a 1939 film directed by Edgar G. Ulmer and filmed in New Jersey. She also appeared in the 1940 Yiddish film, Overture to Glory about a cantor. Her sole Broadway role was in Clean Beds in 1939.

Beverley began appearing in mainstream English-language Hollywood films during the 1940s. her credits from this period included Black Magic in 1944; The Master Race, a 1944 film about the dangers of Nazi Germany; and Stairway for a Star, a 1947 musical. She continued to appear in smaller film roles during the 1950s, including The Robe as Rebecca and The Shrike in 1955. She appeared in an episode of the television series, The Rifleman, in 1960. Her last film appearance was in the 1961 film Ada.

== Family ==
Beverley married actor Lee J. Cobb in 1940. They had two children, son Vincent and daughter, actress Julie Cobb, before their 1952 divorce.

== Death ==
Beverley died at the Motion Picture & Television Country House and Hospital in Los Angeles, California, on July 15, 2011, aged 94. Her interment was at Hillside Memorial Park Cemetery.

== Filmography ==
Year	Title	Role	Notes
1937	Green Fields	Tzineh - 'Tsine'	
1939	The Light Ahead	Hodel (the blind)	
1940	Overture to Glory	Wanda Mirova	
1944	Black Magic	Norma Duncan / Nancy Wood	
1944	The Master Race	Mrs. Martha Varin	
1947	Stairway for a Star	Jane Adams	
1953	The Robe	Rebecca	Uncredited
1954	Playgirl	Anne	
1955	The Shrike	Miss Thatcher	Uncredited
1961	Ada	Mrs. Stauton	Uncredited
