= Zerita Stepteau =

American actress

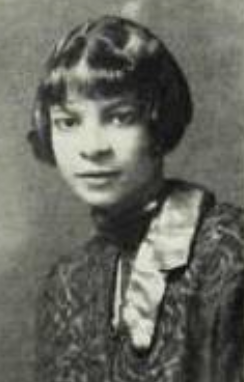
- Zerita Stepteau, from the 1927 yearbook of Howard University
- Born: 1908; Baltimore, Maryland
- Died: June 21, 1962; Baltimore, Maryland
- Other names: Zoreta Steptoe, Zerita Steptean, Zereta Stepteau, Zerita S. Mitchell
- Occupation(s): Actress, musician

Zerita Mae Stepteau (1908 – June 21, 1962) was an American actress and musician, based for most of her life in Baltimore, Maryland.

== Early life and education ==
Stepteau was born in Baltimore, the daughter of Rev. C. Harold Stepteau and Estella V. Lyons Stepteau. Her father was pastor of Metropolitan A. M. E. Church in Washington, D.C., and of Bethel A. M. E. Church in Baltimore. She graduated from Douglass High School in 1924, and from Howard University in 1929.

== Career ==
Stepteau pursued a performing career, as leader of the Ambrose Smith Orchestra in Baltimore in 1932, and in the musical film, Moon Over Harlem (1939), directed by Edgar G. Ulmer. She also appeared in a comedy film, Mr. Washington Goes to Town (1942). She also wrote music and lyrics.

Stepteau lived in Texas in the 1930s, where she was a church organist and a member of the San Antonio Negro Little Theater. In 1931 she was in the company's cast for The Brat and George Broadhurst's Bought and Paid For, and she organized a show, Blue Review, as a benefit for an orphanage in San Antonio. She wrote and directed a "brilliant revue" called Love and Chances in 1935, at the Houston College for Negroes.

In 1939, she worked with the Bud Harris company as a "comedienne-pianist" in Baltimore. In 1943 she played piano and solovox in a Baltimore swing ensemble, Doc Green's Band.

== Films ==
- Moon Over Harlem (1939)
- Mr. Washington Goes to Town (1942)

== Personal life ==
In 1932, Stepteau married dentist Lewis Matthew Mitchell Jr. She married again in 1942, to Lynwood Peters. She died in 1962, at the age of 54, in Baltimore.
