= Arline Garson =

American film and television editor

- Born: January 15, 1927; New York, New York, USA
- Died: September 5, 2016 (aged 89); New York, New York, USA
- Occupation(s): Film editor, TV editor

Arline Garson (1927–2016) was a New York City–based American film and television editor active from the 1960s through the 1980s. She was a film editor with Sid Katz on The Beatles at Shea Stadium (1966), which documented the famous concert on the Beatles' first trip to the US. She edited many NY based productions of TV shows in the 1960s and 1970s. Those credits include episodes of The Defenders, NYPD and Brenner. Her last credit was on the 1985 film A Nightmare on Elm Street 2: Freddy's Revenge. She died on September 5, 2016.

== Selected filmography ==
- A Nightmare on Elm Street 2: Freddy's Revenge (1985)
- Alone in the Dark (1982)
- The Swap (1979)
- The Man Who Would Not Die (1975)
- Rivals (1972)
- The People Next Door (1970)
- House of Dark Shadows (1970)
- Sam's Song (1969)
- Hey, Let's Twist! (1961)
