= The Cavern (1964 film) =

1964 film

- Directed by: Edgar G. Ulmer
- Screenplay by: Michael Pertwee
- Story by: Michael Pertwee; Jack Davies
- Produced by: Edgar G. Ulmer
- Starring: John Saxon; Rosanna Schiaffino
- Cinematography: Gábor Pogány
- Edited by: Renato Cinquini
- Music by: Carlo Rustichelli
- Color process: Black and white
- Production companies: Cinedoris S.P.A. Ernst Neubach-Film
- Distributed by: 20th Century Fox
- Release dates: 26 June 1964 (West Germany); 31 December 1964 (Italy)
- Running time: 102 minutes
- Countries: Italy; West Germany; United States
- Language: English

The Cavern (Italian: Sette contro la morte, German: Neunzig Nächte und ein Tag, also known as Helden - Himmel und Hölle) is a 1964 Italian-German-American war-drama film directed by Edgar G. Ulmer. This was his last film as a director. It was one of a number of war movies John Saxon made outside Hollywood.

== Plot ==
In 1944, Allied forces are fighting German Nazi troops who have occupied Italy. Near an Italian village, Anna, a local woman finds her lost goat in an abandoned hillside cavern, followed by her sometimes-boyfriend Mario. American Sergeant Joe Cramer, also finds the cavern and alerts his small reconnaissance party, led by a Captain Wilson and accompanied by a British war journalist and officer, who still likes to be addressed as "General" Braithwaite. They are also joined by another soldier, Lieutenant Peter Carter, claiming to be a Canadian officer but soon revealed to be a deserter. The group is confronted by German officer Hans Beck and his sergeant, but nearby shelling seals the mouth of the cavern, killing the sergeant and trapping the seven together.

The group discovers that the cavern had been used as a supply and munitions depot, with a generator and enough food and water to sustain them for some time, as well as a stock of brandy. Not finding any other exit, the group sort themselves into individual living areas, while their social relationships realign. Captain Wilson has no real command experience, and General Braithwaite is too old and set in his ways to be an effective commander, so Cramer becomes the leader of the group. Anna, who finds herself relegated to "women's work," cooking and washing up, rebels while sexual tension builds between her and Cramer. Braithwaite finds a cache of brandy and is discovered by Wilson, who promises not to inform the others as long as he can share the General's hidden bottles.

The group manages to hold together for many months while seeking a way out of the cavern, but the confinement, dwindling supplies, and personality conflicts take an increasing toll on their mental states and united purpose. Changes happen over time among the trapped people. Although she had been Mario's girl before the cavern, Anna spurns him and takes Cramer as her lover. Cramer discovers Wilson and Braithwaite had been boozing it up and confiscates the brandy, putting it under lock and key, issuing it only occasionally on special occasions like Christmas dinner. Wilson attempts to swim through the underground stream's passages and drowns. Later, Beck, exploring an unmapped passage, finds an opening to the outside; but just as he emerges into daylight and what he expects to be freedom, is shot and killed by anti-Nazi partisans. Some time after that, Carter attempts to follow the stream out of the mountain using an air pump and hose diving rig he designed that was built by Mario, but Carter falls to his death. Ironically, his body is washed downstream, over a waterfall, and into the pool below, outside the mountain.

Cramer symbolically weds Anna, using a ring given to him by Carter just before the ill-fated dive attempt. Overcome by his alcoholism, creeping insanity, and growing claustrophobia, Braithwaite commits suicide by pulling the pin and falling on a hand grenade in one of the chambers that had been used to store explosives. The resulting explosion opens a fissure that leads to the outside world. Anna, Cramer, and Mario stumble through it to freedom, the only survivors of the group that had been trapped in the cavern for so many months.

== Cast ==
- John Saxon as Pvt. Joe Cramer
- Rosanna Schiaffino as Anna
- Larry Hagman as Capt. Wilson
- Peter Marshall as Lt. Peter Carter
- Nino Castelnuovo as Mario Scognamiglio
- Brian Aherne as Gen. Braitwaite
- Hans von Borsody as Oberlt. Hans Beck
- Joachim Hansen as German Sergeant

== Production ==
Although the screenplay is credited to Jack Davies and Michael Pertwee, some confusion has existed about whether those writers were serving as fronts for the once-blacklisted screenwriter Dalton Trumbo. A 2015 biography of Trumbo co-written by his son Christopher cites Trumbo's claim that "For $5,000 and using a pseudonym that he no longer remembered, Trumbo dashed off a script that was probably not very good," and later demanded that his name be removed from anything to do with the production. Film scholar Bernard F. Dick labels the assertion that Trumbo was denied screen credit for the film as a "Fallacy," noting that Trumbo had written the screenplay while blacklisted, but even though the blacklist had been lifted by the time of the film's release, he still wanted his pseudonym to be used. Although Dick calls The Cavern "a director's film," he does cite a scene of the trapped characters celebrating Christmas as a "quintessential Trumbo touch." The exact roles of Davies and Pertwee remain unclear.

Working with a small budget by Hollywood standards, but still larger than most films he had directed, Ulmer began shooting in the Postojna Caves in Slovenia (Yugoslavia at the time) but was forced to relocate to Trieste, Italy, where an interior cavern set was constructed.

== See also ==
- The Blockhouse (1973)
- List of American films of 1964
