= The Master Race (film) =

1944 film by Herbert Biberman

- Theatrical release poster
- Directed by: Herbert Biberman
- Screenplay by: Herbert Biberman; Anne Froelich; Rowland Leigh
- Story by: Herbert Biberman
- Produced by: Robert Golden
- Starring: George Coulouris; Stanley Ridges; Osa Massen; Carl Esmond; Nancy Gates; Morris Carnovsky; Lloyd Bridges; Helen Beverly; Gavin Muir; Paul Guilfoyle
- Cinematography: Russell Metty
- Edited by: Ernie Leadlay
- Music by: Roy Webb
- Production company: RKO Radio Pictures
- Distributed by: RKO Radio Pictures
- Release date: October 18, 1944
- Running time: 95 minutes
- Country: United States
- Language: English
- Budget: $350,000
- Box office: less than $1 million

The Master Race is a 1944 American drama film directed by Herbert Biberman and written by Biberman, Anne Froelich and Rowland Leigh. The film stars George Coulouris, Stanley Ridges, Osa Massen, Carl Esmond, Nancy Gates, Morris Carnovsky, Lloyd Bridges, Helen Beverly, Gavin Muir and Paul Guilfoyle. The film was released on October 18, 1944, by RKO Radio Pictures.

== Plot ==
As the Nazis come to realise that their dreams of world domination after World War II will not be fulfilled and that Germany is in fact about to be defeated, a fanatical hard core prepare for the future Fourth Reich and the continuation of the dream of Aryan supremacy in later generations. To this end, Nazi officer von Beck is sent to infiltrate a village in rural Belgium where he will wait to agitate again for racial supremacy for "true Europeans" over lesser, "mongrel" races.

== Cast ==
- George Coulouris as Von Beck
- Stanley Ridges as Phil Carson
- Osa Massen as Helena
- Carl Esmond as Andrei
- Nancy Gates as Nina
- Morris Carnovsky as Old Man Bartoc
- Lloyd Bridges as Frank
- Eric Feldary as Altmeier
- Helen Beverly as Mrs. Varin
- Gavin Muir as William Forsythe
- Paul Guilfoyle as Katry
- Richard Aherne as Sergeant O'Farrell
- Ludwig Donath as Schmidt
- Herbert Rudley as John
- Gigi Perreau as Bab
