= Black Magic (1944 film) =

1944 mystery film starring Sidney Toler directed by Phil Rosen

- Film poster
- Directed by: Phil Rosen
- Written by: Earl Derr Biggers (characters); George Callahan (screenplay)
- Produced by: Phillip N. Krasne; James S. Burkett
- Starring: Sidney Toler
- Cinematography: Arthur Martinelli
- Edited by: John F. Link Sr.
- Music by: Alexander Laszlo
- Production company: Monogram Pictures
- Distributed by: Monogram Pictures
- Release date: August 14, 1944
- Running time: 67 minutes
- Country: United States
- Language: English

Black Magic, later retitled Meeting at Midnight for television, is a 1944 mystery film directed by Phil Rosen and starring Sidney Toler as Charlie Chan.

It was the third Charlie Chan film made by Toler at Monogram Pictures.

== Plot ==
Charlie postpones his trip home from service with the government to Honolulu to help with the investigation of murder involving Number One Daughter (Frances Chan) and an easily spooked chauffeur (Mantan Moreland).

Mr. William Bonner is murdered in the middle of a seance with a total of 8 witnesses, seen and unseen, present. Charlie Chan's daughter Frances Chan (real name Chan) is one of the witnesses and is detained. When police learn of Frances's true identity as Charlie Chan's daughter, he is summoned to police headquarters. The police offer the case to the famous Chinese Detective and he reluctantly agrees in order to get his daughter released. The police cannot find a gun anywhere in the house. Police then learn from the coroner that Mr. Bonner was shot and the bullet did not go all the way thorough, yet it is not lodged anywhere in the body. The seance room is supported by a gadget room to assist in the various ghostly appearances. Birmingham Brown's comedy with the various seance gadgets serve to link the movie audience with a "me too" bond which is very warm and human. Since there was no gun and no bullet, Charlie Chan has the Coroner perform an experiment to determine what might have happened. The case is solved when the murderer brushes up against Charlie Chan in a reenactment of the crime with Charlie Chan sitting where the murdered man was sitting.

== Cast ==
- Sidney Toler as Charlie Chan
- Mantan Moreland as Birmingham Brown
- Frances Chan as Frances Chan
- Joseph Crehan as Police Sgt. Matthews
- Helen Beverly as Norma Duncan / Nancy Wood (as Helen Beverley)
- Jacqueline deWit as Justine Bonner
- Geraldine Wall as Harriet Green
- Ralph Peters as Officer Rafferty
- Frank Jaquet as Paul Hamlin

== Reception ==
The Los Angeles Times said the climax was "unusually absorbing".
