= Ruzha Fuchs =

- Born: 1890; Lwów, Poland (now Lviv, Ukraine)
- Died: 1942 (aged 51–52); Równe
- Occupation: Yiddish theater actress
- Spouse(s): Yakov Fuchs (divorced), Georg Rot
- Children: Leo Fuchs

Ruzha Fuchs (Róża Fuchs) (1890–1942), was a Yiddish theater actress. Born in Lwów, Poland (now Lviv, Ukraine). She entered the chorus of a Polish-language theater as she didn't know much Yiddish, but through connections was taken into the Yiddish theater chorus a month later. The director, Adolf Gimpel, was favorably impressed and cast her as Yitskhok in Abraham Goldfaden's Akeydos Yitskhok (The Sacrifice of Isaac). After a few months in Lwów, she was engaged in Rumania and then Chernovets, as a soubrette – and she became der libling fun teater-oylem (the darling of the theater audiences). After three years she returned to Lwów.

In 1915, she played in the Polish-language Bagatela miniature theater. In 1917, she starred in Pinsk, now in Belarus. She and character actor Yakov Fuchs were the parents of the famous Polish-American actor Leo Fuchs. After divorcing Yakov she remarried the actor Georg (Gershon) Rot. Soon after Molly Picon ended her tour in Lwów, Róża took over her roles in Yankele and Tsipke Fayer.

In 1939 Nazi Germany and Soviet Russia both invaded Poland, starting World War II. The Soviet Red Army took Lwów, and a new Yiddish theater took over the Koloseum theater. Fuchs and her second husband played there. In 1941 Germany attacked Soviet Russia and took Lwów. Some members of the theater troupe, including Róża, were trapped in Równe (Rovne) and sent to the ghetto, where Róża was shot dead by the Germans.
