= The Glass Wall =

1953 film by Maxwell Shane

- Theatrical release poster
- Directed by: Maxwell Shane
- Screenplay by: Maxwell Shane; Ivan Tors
- Produced by: Ivan Tors
- Starring: Vittorio Gassman; Gloria Grahame
- Cinematography: Joseph F. Biroc
- Edited by: Stanley Frazen; Herbert L. Strock
- Music by: Leith Stevens
- Production company: Shane-Tors Productions
- Distributed by: Columbia Pictures
- Release date: March 20, 1953 (San Francisco)
- Running time: 80 minutes
- Country: United States
- Language: English

The Glass Wall is a 1953 American drama film noir directed by Maxwell Shane and starring Vittorio Gassman and Gloria Grahame. The black-and-white film was produced and distributed by Columbia Pictures. The title refers to a design feature of the United Nations headquarters in New York City.

It tied with two other films for the 1953 Golden Leopard, the top prize at the Locarno International Film Festival.

== Plot ==
Peter Kuban is a Hungarian displaced person and survivor of World War II Nazi concentration camps. He stows away in Trieste on a ship bound for New York City. However, he is spotted by ship officials and held for American authorities. When the ship arrives in New York, he claims that he qualifies for entry under an exception for those who helped Allied soldiers during the war, but all he knows about the paratrooper he hid from the enemy is that his name is Tom, that he plays the clarinet in a jazz band in Times Square and that before they parted company in Europe, he gave him his military wristwatch which Peter now wears on his wrist. The immigration authorities, led by Inspector Bailey, say that without better documentation he must be sent back to communist Hungary on the same ship, which departs the next morning.

Kuban escapes by leaping off the ship to the dock below, but breaks some ribs, then begins his search for Tom. Peter's picture and a caption of him being wanted is plastered over the front page of the city's tabloids.

He encounters unemployed factory worker Maggie Summers in a restaurant. When she steals a coat off a rack she is spotted and flees. Peter follows after her and helps her elude the police. They go to her apartment, where she tends his injury as best she can. When her landlady, Mrs. Hinckley, threatens to evict her for being behind on her rent, Peter gives Maggie all the money he has. Eddie, the landlady's bullying son, barges in and sexually harasses Maggie. Peter bursts out of hiding and starts fighting him, but gets pummeled. Maggie knocks Eddie out with a chair and flees with Peter.

The Hinckleys notify the police, claiming Peter was the attacker. He is subsequently pursued by the authorities for aggravated assault, described as dangerous and possibly armed. Meanwhile, Tom discovers Peter's picture on a discarded newspaper. He wants to go to the immigration department, but his girlfriend Nancy persuades him to attend an important audition instead. Tom impresses band leader Jack Teagarden, but leaves abruptly to try to help Peter.

The fleeing couple attempt to hide out in the subway, but are recognized. The police grab Maggie, but Peter gets away. While being questioned by authorities, she meets up with Tom. After hearing his story, Inspector Bailey believes Peter's story, but only if they can reach him before the ship departs at 7 am. After that, by law, Peter will be guilty of a felony for jumping ship, deported, and forever ineligible to be admitted to the United States. The trio drive around searching for him. Suffering from his injuries, Peter slips into an unoccupied taxi and collapses. When burlesque dancer Tanya gets into it after work, she recognizes him from the newspaper photo. She takes him to her apartment for rest and a meal. Her real name is actually Bella Zakoyla, and she is a fellow "Hunky". Her immigrant mother approves, but her criminal brother fears police becoming involved, saying that Peter's plight is the responsibility of the United Nations. Their loud argument rouses him from sleep in the next room. He slips away, leaving a note apologizing to Tanya for causing her so much trouble.

Acting on Freddie's assertion, Peter heads toward the United Nations building early in the morning. He is recognized on the way and the police are put on his trail. Maggie, Tom, Bailey, and two officers pursue Peter through the halls of the U.N. Unable to find anyone to help him, he delivers a soliloquy to an empty meeting room of the U.N. Human Rights Commission, with places marked for representatives of the U.N.'s member states. He calls for recognition that peace and freedom for the world require peace and freedom for every individual. After more flight Peter panics, heads to the roof, and ascends a parapet wall to jump. Maggie and Tom reach him and the sound of Tom's voice causes Peter to collapse backward onto the roof. All reassure Peter that he is now safe.

== Cast ==
- Vittorio Gassman as Peter Kuban
- Gloria Grahame as Maggie Summers
- Ann Robinson as Nancy
- Douglas Spencer as Inspector Bailey
- Robin Raymond as Tanya
- Jerry Paris as Tom
- Jack Teagarden as himself
- Shorty Rogers as himself

In addition, Elizabeth Slifer and Richard Reeves played the Hinckley mother and son, while Joseph Turkel and Else Neft played the Zakoyla brother and mother. Michael Fox did double duty as Toomey and the narrator.

== Background ==
The film was shot on location in New York City, including at the United Nations building (the "glass wall" of the title) on First Avenue at 42nd Street in Manhattan.

== Reception ==
In 2011, film critic Dennis Schwartz wrote "Columbia's off-beat postwar noir project, whose title is taken from the U.N.'s glass wall, turned out rather well ..."

The Glass Wall shared the Golden Leopard, the top prize of the Locarno International Film Festival in 1953 with Julius Caesar and The Composer Glinka (Kompozitor Glinka).
