= Julie Cobb =

American actress

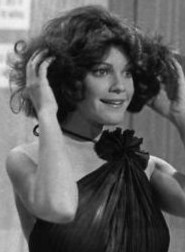
- Cobb in 1977
- Born: 1947 (age 78–79); Los Angeles, California, U.S.
- Education: Beverly Hills High School; San Francisco State College
- Occupation: Actress
- Years active: 1968–present
- Known for: Charles in Charge; After the Fall
- Spouses: Victor French (m. 1976; div. 1978) Christopher Morgan (m. 1978; div. 1985) James Cromwell (m. 1986; div. 2005)
- Children: 1
- Parents: Lee J. Cobb (father); Helen Beverley (mother)

Julie Cobb (born 1947) is an American actress. She is the daughter of actor Lee J. Cobb.

== Early life ==
Cobb was born in Los Angeles, California, to a Jewish family. Her parents were actor Lee J. Cobb and actress Helen Beverley. She went to Beverly Hills High School and attended San Francisco State College for two years. Before she became an actress, she was a receptionist, taught English in Mexico City, and for a few months worked as a Playboy bunny.

== Career ==
Cobb's career, which lasted over 50 years, mostly consisted of guest appearances on television shows. Her first credited role was in an episode of Star Trek entitled "By Any Other Name", which was first broadcast on February 23, 1968. (She was the only female Redshirt to be killed in the original series.) She appeared on Gunsmoke (1974), Season 20, Ep 13, "The Colonel", as a daughter painfully reuniting with her father, a once proud military officer. The Colonel was portrayed by Julie Cobb's real life father, actor Lee J. Cobb. She appeared on The Brady Bunch (1971), Season 2, Ep 18, "Our Son The Man", as Greg Brady's high school love interest. She appeared in a first season episode of Little House on the Prairie. Cobb played the matriarch of the Pembroke family in the first season of the sitcom Charles in Charge and also appeared on the short-lived series The D.A.

Her film career has included roles in The Second Coming of Suzanne (1974), Just You and Me, Kid (1979), The Runnin' Kind (1989), Lisa (1990), Defending Your Life (1991) and Dr. Jekyll and Ms. Hyde (1995). She also appeared in the TV movie versions of Salem's Lot (1979) and Brave New World (1980). As a stage actress, she won the L.A. Drama Critics Award for her role in a stage production of Arthur Miller's play After the Fall.

== Personal life ==
Cobb married actor James Cromwell on May 29, 1986; he filed for a divorce in 2005.

== Filmography ==
Year	Title	Role	Notes
1968	Star Trek	Yeoman Thompson	"By Any Other Name"
1970	Love, American Style	Valerie	segment "Love and the Pen Pals"
1970	Bracken's World	Girl in Club	
1971	Alias Smith and Jones	young girl	
1971	The Brady Bunch	The Girl	
1971	The D.A.	Katy Benson, Katy, Public Defender Katherine Benson	6 ep.
1972	Sarge	Milly	
1973	Cannon	Amy Gladstone	
1973	The Waltons	Sue Cooper	
1974	The Death Squad	Sharon	TV movie
1974	Dirty Sally	Melinda	
1974	The Second Coming of Suzanne	Stewardess	Film
1973–1974	Gunsmoke	Anne Ludley, Minnie Nolen	2 ep.
1974	Petrocelli	Millie Conway	
1975	Little House on the Prairie	Trudy Coulter	
1975	Marcus Welby, M.D.	Steffie Rhodes	
1975	Medical Story		
1976	State Fair	Karen	TV movie
1976	The Quest	Lucy Braxton	
1977	The Fantastic Journey	Andrea	
1977	A Year at the Top	Trish	
1977	Rosetti and Ryan	Kelly	
1978	Confessions of the D.A. Man	Katy Benson	TV movie
1978	CHiPs	Juliet	
1978	Fantasy Island	Florence Stouton	
1978	Steel Cowboy	Gloria	TV movie
1978	The Incredible Hulk	Jill Norton	
1979	Kaz		
1979	Just You and Me, Kid	Dr. Nancy Faulkner	Film
1979	Lou Grant	Barbara Benedict	
1979	Salem's Lot	Bonnie Sawyer	TV miniseries 2 ep.
1980	Hart to Hart	Scottie McClain	
1980	Brave New World	Linda Lysenko	TV movie
1980	To Find My Son	Connie Marx	TV movie
1981	Ladies' Man	Sheila Thackeray	
1981	Riker	Janis	
1981	Concrete Cowboys	Nancy	Episode: "A Token for Winnie"
1982	Knots Landing		
1982	Insight	Laurie	
1983	Uncommon Valor	Karen Merritt	
1983	The Mississippi		
1983	Tucker's Witch	Natalie Gorman	
1984–1985	Charles in Charge	Jill Pembroke	22 episodes
1985	MacGruder and Loud	Olivia	
1985	T. J. Hooker	Martha Kenter	
1986	St. Elsewhere	Mrs. Moynihan	
1986	MacGyver	Susan Cooper	
1986	Matlock	Janice Pearson	
1987	Family Ties	Maureen Keaton	2 ep.
1987	Designing Women	Janet Shackleford	2 ep.
1987	Starman	Joanna Daniels Kendall	
1987	Baby Girl Scott	Robin	TV movie
1987	Newhart	Leah Myers	
1987	Jake and the Fatman	Ellen Gregg	
1988	Our House	Charlotte	
1985–1988	Magnum P.I.	Magnum's Cousin Karen, Karen	3 eps.
1987–1989	Growing Pains	Grace Thornton, Gracie Thornton, Mrs.Dufelder	4 eps.
1989	Heartbeat	Beverly	
1989	Duet	Annette	
1989	The Robert Guillaume Show	Lisa	
1989	The Runnin' Kind	Aunt Barbara	Film
1989	Lisa	Mrs. Marks	Film
1989	Doogie Howser M.D.	Lauren Aaron	
1990	Life Goes On	Marina Maxwell	
1991	Defending Your Life	Tram Guide	Film
1991	Wildest Dreams		TV movie
1992	Reasonable Doubts	Barbara Lake	
1993	Civil Wars	Jo Ann Reiman	
1993	Brooklyn Bridge	Alice, Aunt Alice	2 eps.
1994	Home Improvement	Francine	
1994	Beverly Hills, 90210	Group Leader	
1992–1995	Hearts Afire	Diandra	2 eps.
1995	Dr. Jekyll and Ms. Hyde	DuBois' Psychiatrist	Film
1995	Partners	Mrs. Blumenthal	
1995	Land's End	Leigh Breck	
1995	Present Tense, Past Perfect		TV movie
1995	New York Daze		
1996	Lois & Clark: The New Adventures of Superman	Sally Reynolds	
1996	Chicago Hope	Joanna-Sutton's ex #1	
1997	Moloney	Dr. Jenny Russell	
1998	Silk Stalkings	Victoria Bradford	
1999	Family Law	Marilyn Reston	
2002	ER	Dr. Felicia Kind	
2002	Days of Our Lives	Carol Burns	
2002–2004	Judging Amy	Attorney Denise Thebault, Mrs. Grandson's Attorney	2 eps.
2007	The Happiest Day of His Life	Ms. Jacob's	Film
2007	The Circuit		
2010	Jelly	Marie Woods	Film
2015	Almost Midnight	Grandma	Short
2017–2018	Whatta Lark	Diane Revere	5 eps.
2020	Teenage Bounty Hunters	Mother	
