= Moon Over Harlem =

1939 film by Edgar George Ulmer

- Directed by: Edgar G. Ulmer
- Written by: Mathew Mathews (story); Shirley Ulmer (screenplay); Mathew Mathews (dialogue); Frank Wilson (story) (uncredited)
- Produced by: Peter E. Kassler (associate producer); Edgar G. Ulmer (producer); Benjamin F. Resnick (producer) (uncredited); Alfred N. Sack (executive producer) (uncredited)
- Starring: See below
- Cinematography: J. Burgi Contner; Edward Hyland
- Edited by: Jack Kemp
- Music by: Donald Heywood
- Distributed by: Sack Amusements
- Release date: 1939
- Running time: 69 minutes
- Country: United States
- Language: English

Moon Over Harlem is a 1939 American race film directed by Edgar G. Ulmer.

== Plot summary ==
A gangster, Dollar Bill Richards, seduces a wealthy widow, Minnie, to get his hands on her money.

== Cast ==
- Bud Harris as Dollar Bill
- Cora Green as Minnie
- Izinetta Wilcox as Sue
- Earl Gough as Bob
- Zerita Stepteau as Jackie
- Petrina Moore as Alice
- Daphne Fray as Pat
- Mercedes Gilbert as Jackie's mother
- Frances Harrod as Maud
- Alec Lovejoy as Fats
- Walter Richardson as Brother Hornsby
- Slim Thompson as Long-Boy
- Freddie Robinson as Half-Pint
- John Bunn as Wallstreet
- Marieluise Bechet as Nina Mae Brown
- Archie Cross as A Boy from Newark
- William Woodward as A Boy from Newark
- John Fortune as Jamaica
- Audrey Talbird as Connie
- Marie Young as Jean
- Christopher Columbus and His Swing Crew as Themselves
- Sidney Bechet as himself - Clarinetist

== Soundtrack ==
- "My Hope Chest of Dreams" (1939) (Music and lyrics by Donald Heywood)
- Zerita Stepteau - "St. Louis Blues" (1914) (Music and lyrics by W.C. Handy)
- Christopher Columbus and His Swing Crew and sung by Izinetta Wilcox and chorus - "Teach Me How to Sing Again" (1939) (Music and lyrics by Donald Heywood)
- Christopher Columbus and His Swing Crew - "Save Some of Those Roses for Me" (published title) as "Save Me Some of Those Kisses" (1939) (Music and lyrics by Donald Heywood)
- Mourners at the funeral - "One More River to Cross" (1939) (Music and lyrics by Donald Heywood)
- "Moon Over Harlem" (1939) (Music and lyrics by Donald Heywood)
- "Stand Together Children" (1939) (Music and lyrics by Donald Heywood)
- "Lullaby" (1939) (Music and lyrics by Donald Heywood)
