= Thunder Over Texas =

1934 film by Edgar George Ulmer

- Film poster
- Directed by: Edgar G. Ulmer
- Written by: Shirley Ulmer (story); Eddie Granemann (screenplay)
- Produced by: Arthur Alexander; Max Alexander
- Starring: See below
- Cinematography: Harry Forbes
- Edited by: George M. Merrick
- Production companies: M & A Alexander Productions Inc.
- Distributed by: Beacon Pictures
- Release date: October 18, 1934
- Running time: 61 minutes
- Country: United States
- Language: English

Thunder Over Texas is a 1934 American contemporary Western film directed by Edgar G. Ulmer under the alias Joen Warner (the name of Ulmer's previous wife) and produced by two nephews of Universal Pictures head Carl Laemmle, Arthur and Max Alexander's Poverty Row Beacon Productions. The film's story was written by Shirley Ulmer under the name of Sherle Castle. Shirley was then married to Max Alexander but would soon leave Max to marry Edgar with the result that Lammele blacklisted Ulmer from Hollywood. The film was shot in Kernville, California.

Thunder Over Texas was the first of several Westerns produced by the Alexanders starring Guinn "Big Boy" Williams.

== Plot ==
The film opens with an apparent bank robbery terminated when the driver of the alleged getaway car is fatally shot by a sniper. Inside the car is the late driver's daughter, Tiny Norton who is adopted by rancher Ted Wright and his Three Stooges type ranch hands, Tom, Dick and Harry, the "Three Radio Nuts" who spend their time impersonating radio stars. The robbery and assassination of Tiny's father was orchestrated by a cruel and corrupt banker in cahoots with a crooked sheriff.

== Cast ==
- Guinn "Big Boy" Williams ... Ted Wright
- Marion Shilling ... Helen Mason
- Helen Westcott ... Betty "Tiny" Norton
- Philo McCullough ... Sheriff Tom Collier
- Victor Potel ... Dick
- Ben Corbett ... Tom
- Tiny Skelton ... Harry
- Claude Payton ... Bruce Laird
- Robert McKenzie ... Judge Blake
- Dick Botiller ... Gonzalez

== Quotes ==
"I'll get you for this!" - Sheriff Collier
"Don't let anything stop you but fear" - Ted Wright
