= The D.A. (1971 TV series) =

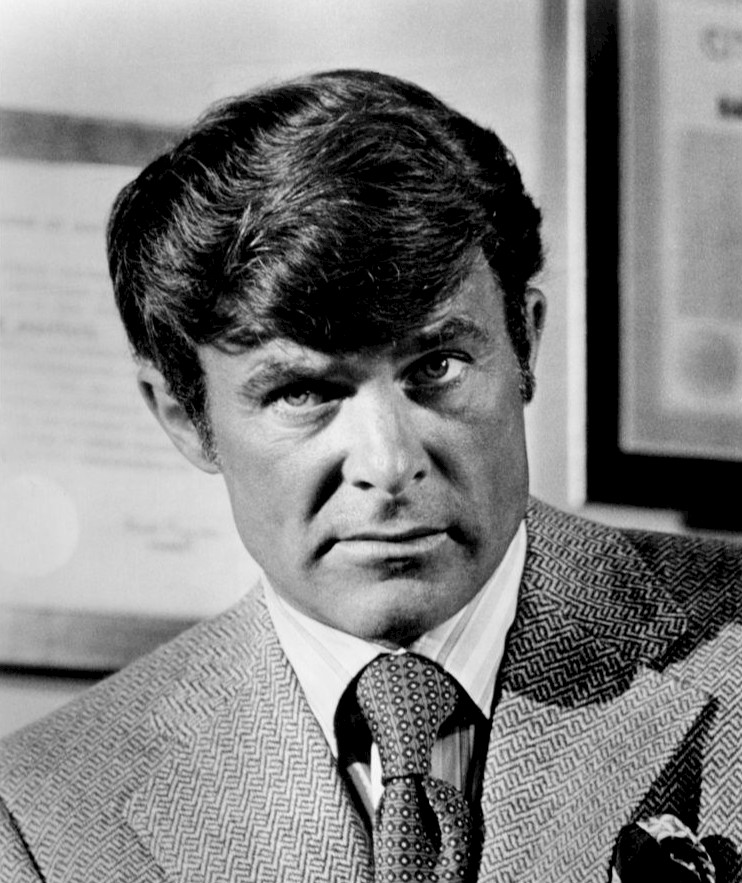
- Robert Conrad as Paul Ryan
- Genre: Legal drama
- Created by: Harold Jack Bloom
- Written by: Stephen J. Cannell; Robert A. Cinader; Robert C. Dennis; Sidney Morse
- Directed by: Alan Crosland, Jr. Dennis Donnelly; Harry Harris; Paul Krasny; Harry Morgan; Hollingsworth Morse; Ozzie Nelson; Alex Nicol; Boris Sagal; Jack Webb
- Starring: Robert Conrad; Harry Morgan; Ned Romero; Julie Cobb
- Theme music composer: Nelson Riddle
- Composers: Frank Comstock; Nelson Riddle
- Country of origin: United States
- Original language: English
- No. of seasons: 1
- No. of episodes: 15

Production
- Executive producer: Jack Webb
- Producer: Robert Forward
- Running time: 24 mins.
- Production companies: Mark VII Limited; Universal Television

Original release
- Network: NBC
- Release: September 17, 1971 – January 7, 1972

The D.A. is an American half-hour legal drama that aired Fridays at 8:00-8:30 pm on NBC for the 1971–72 season. It ran from September 17, 1971, to January 7, 1972, and was replaced by Sanford and Son the following week. The show was packaged by Jack Webb's Mark VII Limited for Universal Television and is not to be confused with a show Webb produced in 1959 with a similar name, The D.A.'s Man, which starred John Compton in the lead role.

== Synopsis ==
The D.A. starred Robert Conrad as Deputy District Attorney Paul Ryan, a tough-minded, hard-hitting prosecutor in Los Angeles County, who was assisted by criminal investigator Bob Ramirez (Ned Romero). He prosecuted all types of cases under the watchful eye of his supervisor, Chief Deputy District Attorney H. M. "Staff" Stafford (Harry Morgan, who directed at least one episode himself). His opponent was usually Public Defender Katherine Benson (Julie Cobb). During the courtroom segments, Ryan also provided a voice-over narration (like Dragnet), which brought the audience in on legal jargon and court procedures and allowed for less exposition in the dialogue, which was necessary due to the program's brevity, as most legal dramas have episodes twice the length of that of The D.A..

This program, however, is probably less known for its own storylines than for its lack of station clearances. Several NBC affiliates refused to air the program (mainly because it ran against ABC's The Brady Bunch), choosing instead to take the time period for themselves (usually filling it with syndicated programs). Because of the station defections, NBC cancelled The D.A. in midseason and replaced it the following week with the highly successful Sanford and Son. It ranked 57th out of 78 shows that season with an average 14.9 rating.

Robert Forward produced the show, which was spun off from two TV-movies produced by Webb's production company, Mark VII Ltd., Murder One from 1969 and Conspiracy to Kill from 1971, both of which fictionalized cases prosecuted by Vincent Bugliosi, world-famous as the prosecutor of Charles Manson. Bugliosi served as technical advisor on both of the pilot films. In his account of the Manson prosecution, Helter Skelter, Bugliosi stated that Conrad modeled the Ryan character on Bugliosi.

A two-part crossover episode began on another Webb show, Adam-12, in which officers Malloy (Martin Milner) and Reed (Kent McCord) made an arrest. In the follow-up episode from The D.A., Ryan handled the eventual prosecution. Co-star Morgan also accompanied Webb's Joe Friday character on the 1967–70 version of Dragnet as Officer Bill Gannon; during the next two seasons, he appeared on Mark VII's Hec Ramsey.

In 1990, producer Dick Wolf dusted off the half-investigation, half-trial format of The D.A. and modified it for his hour-long detective drama Law & Order by eliminating the narration, but using instead a Dragnet-style dialog between characters. The D.A. was not the first broadcast network series to use the format: Arrest and Trial's 90-minute episodes antedate The D.A. by eight years.

Four episodes of the series were combined into a feature-length TV movie called Confessions of the DA Man. "The People vs. Saydo" was used as the basic plot, and while Ryan is attempting to get a friend of the defendant to testify, describes previous cases to try to illustrate the importance of testifying. The cases he recounts are "The People vs. Slovik" because the witness's idealism reminds Ryan of the attorney he faced in that case, "The People vs. Fowler" to illustrate the importance of testifying even when it is difficult (as in the case of the rape victim), and "The People vs. Walsh" to illustrate the dangers faced by police in their daily jobs. The film first aired January 20, 1978, as a CBS Late Movie.

== TV movies ==
Title	Directed by	Written by	Original release date
The D.A.: Murder One	Boris Sagal	Harold Jack Bloom	December 6, 1969
It is up to Los Angeles Deputy District Attorney Paul Ryan to prove that Mary Brokaw, a highly skilled nurse, caused the deaths of numerous patients by administering lethal overdoses of insulin. Guest stars: Howard Duff, Diane Baker
The D.A.: Conspiracy to Kill	Paul Krasny	Stanford Whitmore	January 8, 1971
An old case comes to life again when new evidence causes Ryan to reopen a case he has already won, where the supposedly innocent victim now appears to be the mastermind behind a murder. Guest stars: William Conrad

== Episodes ==
No.	Title	Original release date
1	"The People vs. Drake"	September 17, 1971
Though the father of a little girl has admitted to drowning his daughter, Ryan must show that it was premeditated murder. Directed by Harry Harris Guest stars: Ellen Corby, Raymond Mayo, Judith McConnell
2	"The People vs. Hendry"	September 24, 1971
Whether or not a suspect's confession is admissible will make or break a homicide case. Guest stars: Jay Robinson, Julie Cobb
3	"The People vs. Gayda"	October 1, 1971
A law enforcement officer comes under scrutiny because of the number and type of deals he makes with the criminals he arrests. Guest stars: Colby Chester, Robert Forward
4	"The People vs. Saydo"	October 8, 1971
A student radical is arrested and charged with conspiracy to violate the law governing the control of a deadly weapon. Note: This episode concludes a crossover with Adam-12 that begins in that series episode, "The Radical". Guest stars: John Davis Chandler, Michael Lerner, John David Carson
5	"The People vs. Edwards"	October 15, 1971
A trial's outcome hinges on the testimony of a woman against a drug dealer, but her own substance-induced emotional instability may undo the D.A.'s case. Guest stars: Sharon Farrell, Lloyd Bochner
6	"The People vs. Slovik"	October 22, 1971
Racial tensions precipitate a bottleneck in the court system; a misdemeanor case of petty theft is taking up an inordinate amount of court time because the defendant's attorney refuses to compromise despite the defendant's clear guilt. Guest stars: Tim Matheson, Ray Ballard
7	"The People vs. Lindsey"	November 5, 1971
Deputy D.A. Paul Ryan and the District Attorney's Office are finding out just how difficult it is to get a conviction in a case of alleged child molestation. Guest stars: Virginia Gregg, Dawn Lyn, Jack Bailey
8	"The People vs. Barrington"	November 12, 1971
Things start to go south for Ryan's case when the District Attorney's main witness shows signs of a coming nervous breakdown. Directed by Ozzie Nelson. Guest stars: Gene Raymond, David Nelson, Parley Baer
9	"The People vs. Swammerdam"	November 19, 1971
Illegal offshore oil dumping has become a major environmental problem, and the D.A.'s office starts working night and day to catch the violators. Guest stars: Russ Conway, George Ives, Donald Woods
10	"The People vs. Fowler"	November 26, 1971
A woman is raped by a hooded assailant. Ryan's case depends on whether or not she can positively identify him without having ever seen his face. Guest stars: James McEachin, Anne Whitfield, George Rogatkin, Leigh Christian
11	"The People vs. Howard"	December 3, 1971
Just when Ryan declares a case ready to close, another person comes forward and confesses to the same crime, throwing the whole first case out the window. Guest stars: Nichelle Nichols, Roger Perry
12	"The People vs. Nelson"	December 10, 1971
A man and woman have brought a case against another man, charging him with robbery. But Ryan is finding out that there is more to this than meets the eye as a strange relationship between the three unfolds. Guest stars: John Hubbard, Robert Lipton
13	"The People vs. Whitehead"	December 17, 1971
Ryan has to tread carefully but can't shrink back in the prosecution of a public official accused of corruption and extortion. Guest stars: Susan Oliver
14	"The People vs. Walsh"	December 24, 1971
A 20-year-old murder case is reopened. Guest stars: William Schallert
15	"The People vs. Boley"	January 7, 1972
A heartless furniture salesman who takes advantage of the poor and needy becomes Ryan's next target for prosecution. Guest stars: Shelly Novack

== Later TV episodes ==
Some episodes were later compiled in 1978 as a two-hour TV movie titled Confessions of the D.A. Man which aired on CBS in January 20, 1978, as part of The CBS Late Movie.

== Notes ==
- Brooks, Tim and Marsh, Earle, The Complete Directory to Prime Time Network and Cable TV Shows (2003) ISBN 0-345-45542-8
- TV Guide Guide to TV 2006 (2006) ISBN 0-7607-7572-9
