= Paula Bauersmith =

American actress and crossword creator (1909–1987)

- Born: July 26, 1909; Oakmont, Pennsylvania, US
- Died: August 6, 1987 (aged 78); Saint Vincent's Catholic Medical Center, Manhattan, New York, US
- Occupation: Actress
- Spouse: Barnett Mathew Warren (died 1953)
- Children: 2, including: Jennifer Warren
- Relatives: Roger Gimbel (son-in-law); Jacob Ben-Ami (brother-in-law)

Paula Bauersmith (married name Bauersmith Warren; July 26, 1909 – August 6, 1987) was an American actress and crossword creator.

== Early life and education ==
Bauersmith was born in Oakmont, Pennsylvania to William Robinson Bauersmith and Susan (née Paul). She was educated in Waterbury, Connecticut, and attended the Carnegie Institute of Technology where she trained for the stage.

== Career ==
Bauersmith first appeared on the stage in 1929 while attending the Carnegie Institute of Technology. She made her New York City theatre debut in October 1931 playing Carmen Bracegirdle in the original Broadway theatre production of Lean Harvest at what was then referred to as the Forrest Theatre.

During her theatrical career, which spanned more than three decades,she appeared in several other original Broadway productions, such as Three-Cornered Moon in 1933, Let Freedom Ring (1935), Bury the Dead (1936), Sail Away (1961), and Breakfast at Tiffany's (1966). She also appeared on various theatrical television programs, such as The United States Steel Hour (1954), Producers' Showcase (1955) and a television production of The Crucible (1967).

Paula Bauersmith was also a regular contributor to the crossword puzzles in New York Times.

== Personal life ==
Bauersmith was married to Barnett Mathew Warren (1895–1953), a dentist and playwright. The couple had two children, the educator and professor Paul Warren and the actress, producer and film director Jennifer Warren. Bauersmith was the mother-in-law of the producer Roger Gimbel and the sister-in-law of the actor, theatre and film director Jacob Ben-Ami.

Bauersmith died of cancer at Saint Vincent's Catholic Medical Center, Manhattan on August 6, 1987.
