= Jordan Leondopoulos =

American film director and editor

- Education: City College of New York; Columbia University
- Occupations: Film director and editor

Jordan Leondopoulos, also known as John Shade, is an American film director and editor. He was nominated for an Academy Award for Best Film Editing for the film The Exorcist. He directed the 1969 film Sam's Song, which was subsequently re-edited into the 1979 film The Swap.

== Selected filmography ==
- The Exorcist (1973; co-nominated with Bud S. Smith, Evan A. Lottman and Norman Gay)
