= Rogues' Gallery (1944 film) =

1944 film by Albert Herman

- Directed by: Albert Herman
- Written by: John T. Neville
- Produced by: Albert Herman; Donald C. McKean
- Starring: Frank Jenks; Robin Raymond; H.B. Warner
- Cinematography: Ira H. Morgan
- Edited by: Fred Bain
- Music by: Lee Zahler
- Production company: American Productions
- Distributed by: Producers Releasing Corporation
- Release date: 6 December 1944
- Running time: 60 minutes
- Country: United States
- Language: English

Rogues' Gallery is a 1944 American mystery film directed by Albert Herman and starring Frank Jenks, Robin Raymond and H.B. Warner. It was produced by the Poverty Row studio Producers Releasing Corporation. The film's sets were designed by art director Paul Palmentola.

== Plot ==
Newspaper reporters Patsy Clark and Eddie Porter become entangled in a murder investigation and the theft of an innovative electronic device for listening to distant conversations.

== Cast ==
- Frank Jenks as Eddie Porter
- Robin Raymond as Patsy Clark
- H.B. Warner as Professor Reynolds
- Ray Walker as Jimmy Foster
- Davison Clark as John Foster
- Robert Homans as Police Lieutenant Daniel O'Day
- Frank McGlynn Sr. as Blake
- Pat Gleason as Red
- Edward Keane as City Editor Gentry
- Earle S. Dewey as Eddie Griffith
- Milton Kibbee as Wheeler
- Gene Roth as Mr. Joyce
- George Kirby as Duckworth, the Butler
- Norval Mitchell as Joe Seawell
- John Valentine as Board Member
- Jack Raymond as Mike, the Night Watchman
- Parker Gee as Detective

== Bibliography ==
- Fetrow, Alan G. Feature Films, 1940-1949: a United States Filmography. McFarland, 1994.
