= Leo Fuchs =

American actor

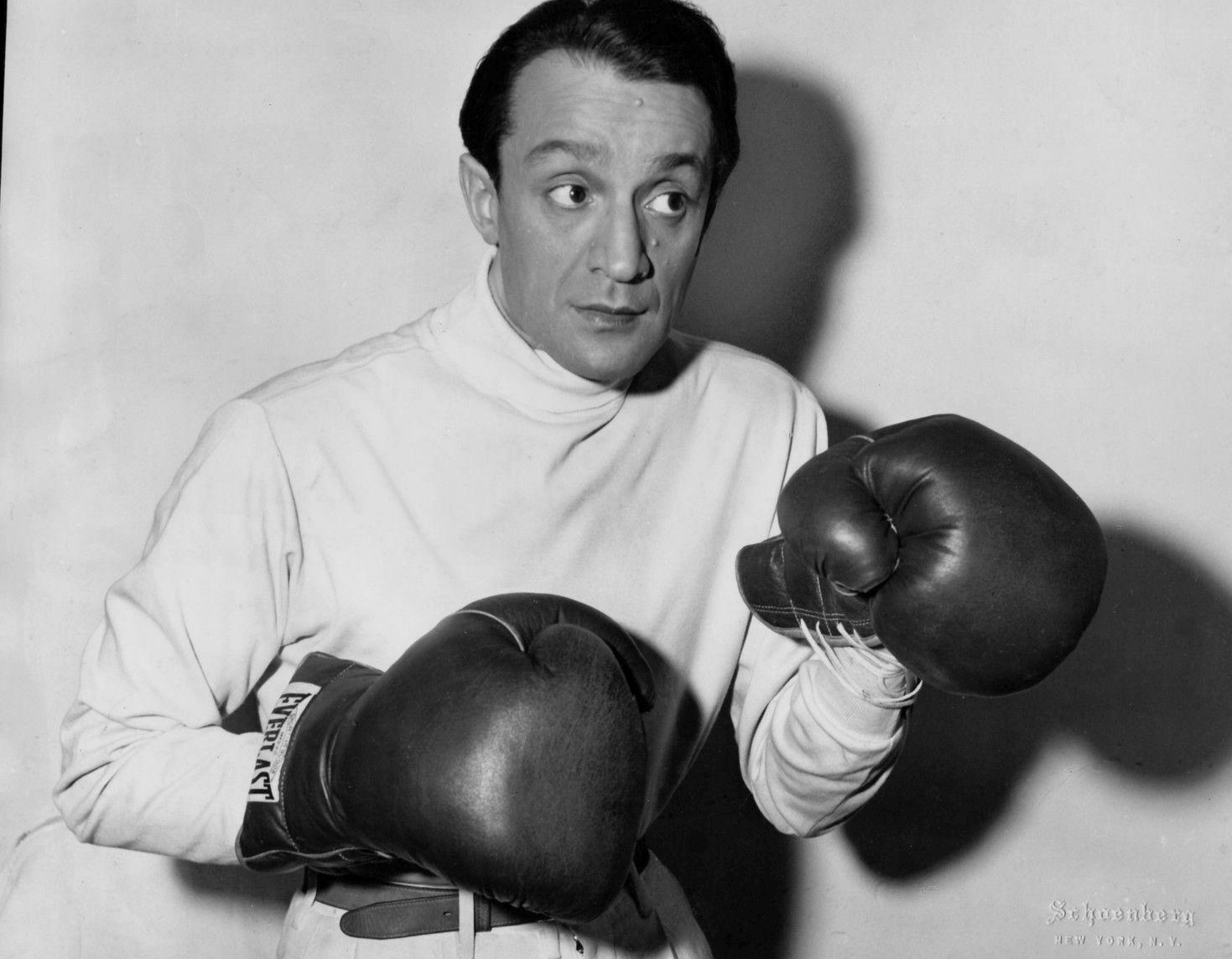
- Fuchs preparing for a role in 1949
- Born: May 15, 1911
- Died: December 31, 1994 (aged 83)
- Occupation: actor

Leo Fuchs (May 15, 1911 – December 31, 1994) was a Polish-born American actor. According to YIVO, he was born Avrum Leib Fuchs in Warsaw; according to Joel Schechter, he was born in Lwów, Galicia, then Poland, now called Lviv, Ukraine.

Fuchs performed in many Yiddish and English plays and movies throughout the mid-twentieth century, and was famed as a comic, a dancer, and a coupletist. He wrote much of his own material and toured widely.

== Early life ==
Fuchs was born into a Yiddish theatrical family: his father, Yakov Fuchs, was a character actor; his mother, Róża Fuchs (Ruzha Fuchs), was "a leading lady of the musical theatre who perished in the Holocaust of the 1940s," shot dead by Nazi Germans. He began acting (in Polish) when he was five years old, and was praised when he performed at the Warsaw cabaret Qui Pro Quo when he was 17.

== Career ==
His American debut was at the Second Avenue Theater in the Yiddish Theater District in Lucky Boy with Moishe Oysher in 1929. He moved to New York City in 1935. In his prime, he was known as "The Yiddish Fred Astaire", appearing both on Broadway and in film. In 1936, he married fellow actor Mirele Gruber and toured with her through Poland for a year. In 1937, he made two movies, the short I Want to Be a Boarder (in which he sang his famous song Trouble) and I Want to Be a Mother with Yetta Zwerling. In 1940, he starred in Amerikaner Shadkhen (American Matchmaker). He divorced in 1941 and later married Rebecca Richman.

Starting in the 1960s, Fuchs performed in English-language plays and television, as well as Hollywood films, including The Story of Ruth (1960). Two of his best-known roles were in The Frisco Kid (1979), in which he played with Gene Wilder, and as Hymie Krichinsky in the film Avalon (1990). He died in Los Angeles in 1994.

== Filmography ==
=== Movies ===
Year	Title	Role	Notes
1937	I Want to Be a Mother	Khaim Bok	
1940	Americaner Shadchen	Nat Silver / Uncle Shya	
1941	Mazel Tov Yidden		
1950	Monticello, Here We Come		
1960	The Story of Ruth	Sochin	
1972	Awake and Sing	Jacob	PBS - TV
1979	The Frisco Kid	Chief Rabbi	
1990	Avalon	Hymie Krichinsky	(final film role)

=== Television ===
Year	Title	Role	Notes
1961	The Tab Hunter Show	Pandro Tremaine	Episode "The Movie Set" (alternate title "A Star Is Born")
1962	Wagon Train	Mr. Levy	Episode "The Levy-McGowan Story"
1963	Mister Ed	Mr. Rasmussen	Episode "Patter of Little Hooves"
1970	Green Acres	Uncle Fedor	Episode "Uncle Fedor"
1972	Sanford and Son	Herman Goldstein	Episode “The Shootout”

== Bibliography ==
- Friedman, Jonathan C. Rainbow Jews: Jewish and Gay Identity in the Performing Arts. Plymouth, UK: Lexington, 2007.
- Lugowski, David. "'Pintele' Queer: The Performance of Jewish Male Heterosexuality in Yiddish American Cinema of the Great Depression." In Griffin, Sean. Hetero: Queering Representations of Straightness. Albany, NY: SUNY Press, 2009. 53–70.
- Schechter, Joel. Messiahs of 1933: How American Yiddish Theatre Survived Adversity through Satire. Philadelphia, PA: Temple UP, 2008.
