= Yakov Fuchs =

Yiddish theater actor

- Born: 1880; Lemburg, Galitsia (now Ukraine)
- Died: 1921 (aged 40–41); Lemburg
- Occupation: theater actor
- Spouse: Ruzha Fuchs
- Children: Leo Fuchs

Yakov Fuchs (1880–1921) was a Yiddish theater actor. Born in Lemburg (Lviv), Galitsia, he joined a Yiddish theater chorus at the age of 17 and after singing in Lemburg and Rumania for a short time, he became a soloist and then starred in Professor Hurvitz's operetta Jacob and Esau. Yakov's voice deteriorated due to lung disease and he became a character actor. He played both comedies and serious dramas. He died of lung disease in Lemburg.

His wife Ruzha Fuchs was a beloved and successful Yiddish theater star; their son Leo Fuchs was a famous actor.
