= Terrayne Crawford =

American actress

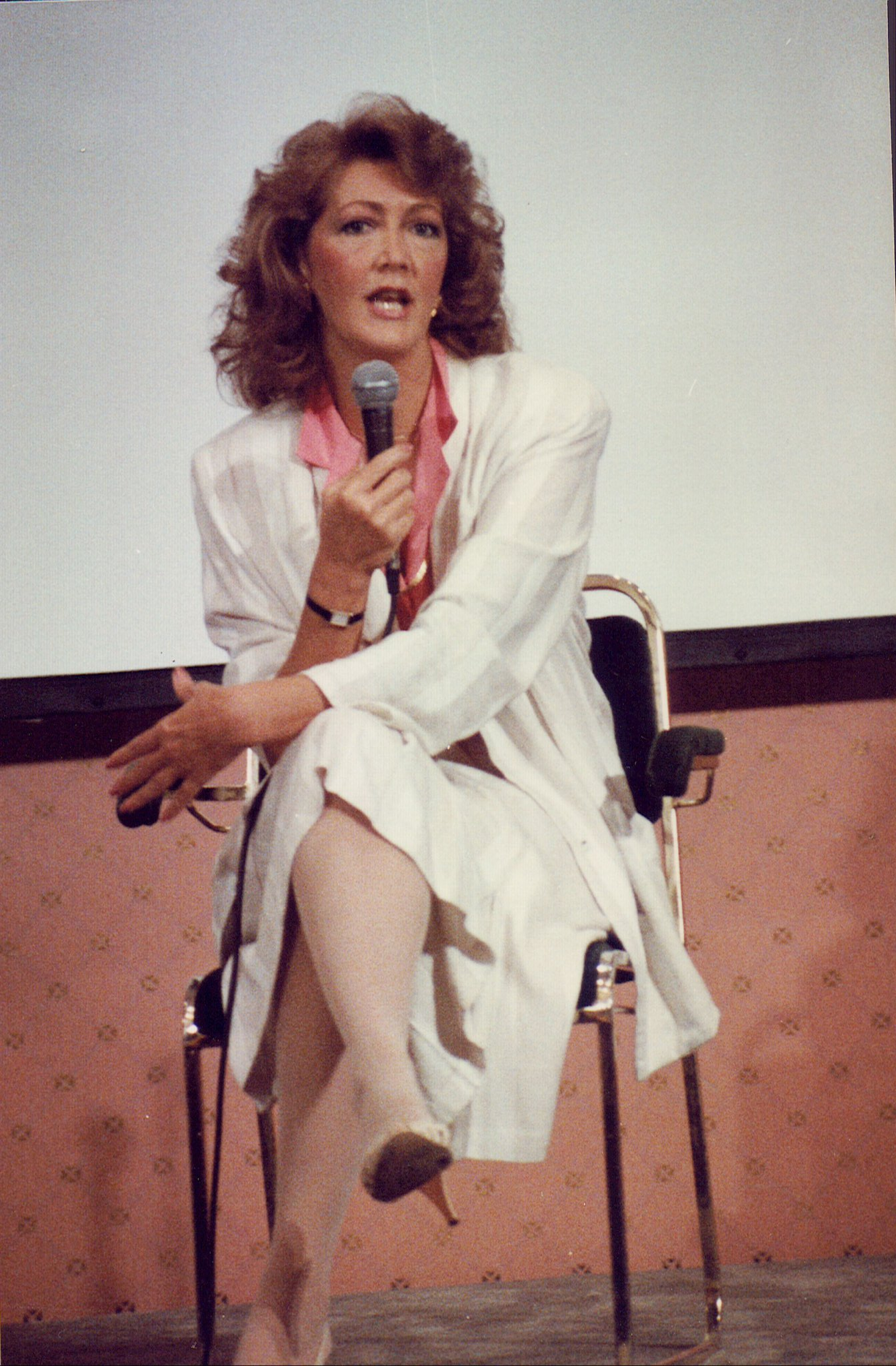
- Born: February 13, 1945 (age 81); Boston, Massachusetts, United States
- Occupation: Actress
- Years active: 1968–2012

Terrayne Crawford (sometimes credited as Terry Crawford born February 13, 1945) is a retired American actress known for her role as Beth Chavez and Edith Collins on the ABC-TV soap opera Dark Shadows from 1968 to 1971.

== Biography ==
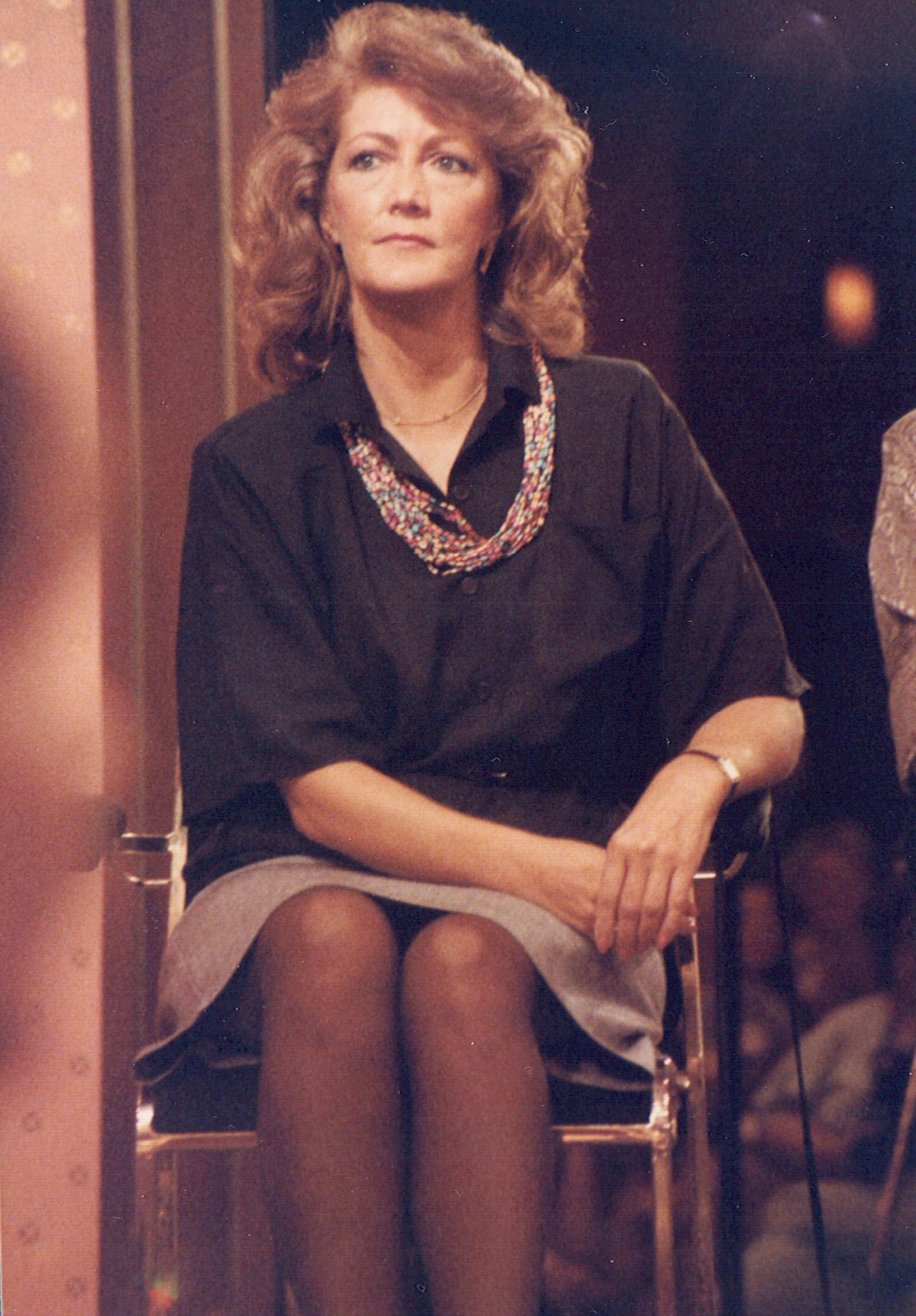
Dark Shadows Festival - NYC -1988

Terrayne Crawford was born on February 13, 1945, in Boston, Massachusetts. After completing her secondary education, she enrolled at Brown University, but never attended due to a severe car accident. While recovering, she changed her plans and moved to New York City with plans to study psychology at Hunter College and pursue an acting career. Beginning her career on the stage, she debuted with To Broadway with Love and later played in By Jupiter and The Apple Tree, which toured the US.

In 1968, Crawford read for Dark Shadows, but simultaneously was offered a part in Sam's Song (1969) with Robert De Niro and took the movie job. When the movie ended, she was asked to play the part of Beth Chavez, the Collins family maid, in Dark Shadows. She left the show after November 1969, but returned in 1970 to play Edith Collins. That role lasted until 1971, near the time that the show was cancelled.

Having completed her education while working on the various projects, Crawford moved to Atlanta after her graduation and became a counselor. She also appeared in the films House of Dark Shadows (1970) as a nurse and in a bit part in Sharky's Machine (1981). Crawford returned to television the following year in a made-for-television movie, Maid in America which starred Susan Clark and Alex Karras. Also beginning in 1982, she played in a recurring role in a soap-opera called The Catlins, which ran through 1984.

In her career as a psychologist, Crawford works in the area of human rights, promoting education and peace initiatives. In 1996, she co-founded an organization called the "Young Media Partners" with Debra Grant. With the international organization, which has branch offices throughout the world, she travels frequently to promote youth participation through media development in improving their worlds.

In 2003, Crawford played the role of Violet Collins in the Big Finish Productions' audio drama Return to Collinwood. In 2010, she reprised her Dark Shadows role of Beth in the audio drama The Doll House, and in 2012 returned to the role of Edith Collins in Dress Me in Dark Dreams.
