= Robin Raymond =

American actress (1916–1994)

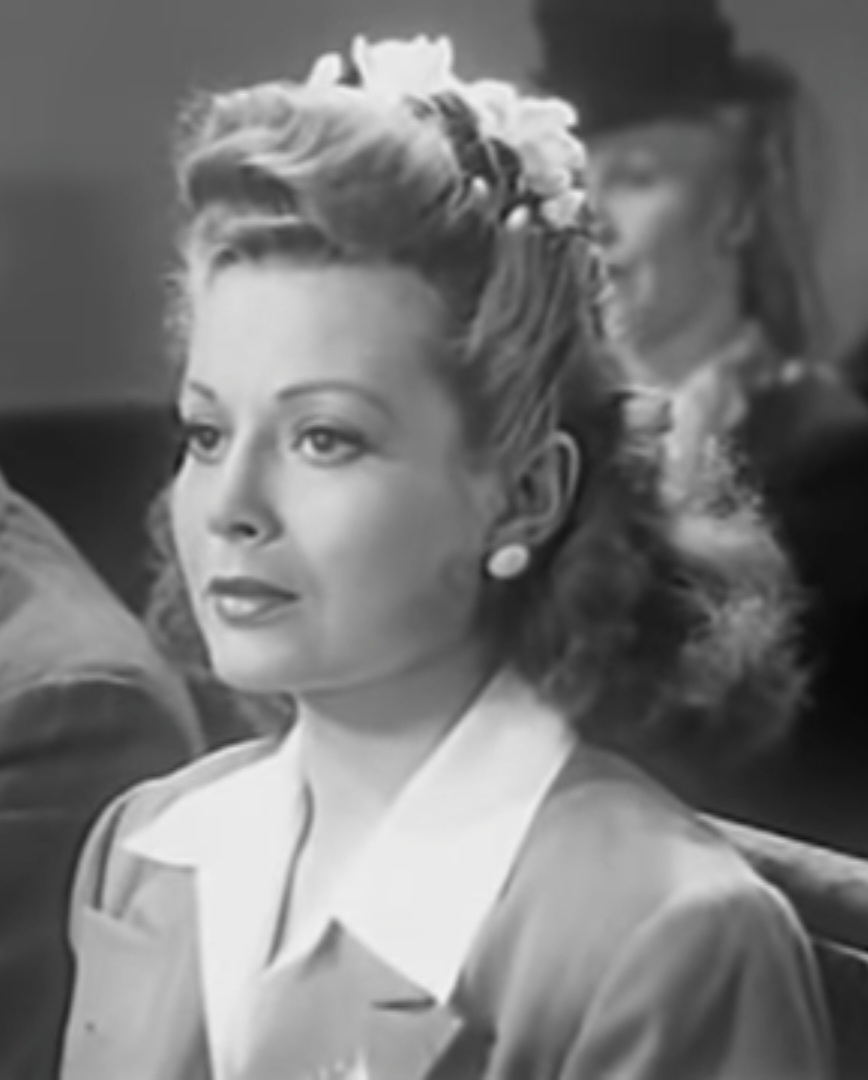
- Raymond in Girls in Chains (1943)
- Born: Eleanor Rae Robin; October 4, 1916
- Died: June 20, 1994 (aged 77)
- Education: Northwestern University (B.A,)
- Occupation: Actress
- Years active: 1938–1980
- Spouses: Norman E. Heeb (m. 1941; div. 1941) Harry A. Epstein (m. 1947; div. 1955)

Robin Raymond (October 4, 1916 – June 20, 1994 ), sometimes credited as Robyn Raymond, was an American film actress. Though she later claimed she was born as Rayemon Robin', census records show her birth name was Eleanor Rae Robin. Her father had changed his name from Rubin to Robin around 1920.

== Early life ==
Raymond graduated from Northwestern University with a bachelor of arts degree and worked as a press agent in Chicago.

== Career ==
On Broadway, Raymond portrayed Blossom Le Verne in See My Lawyer (1939).

She signed a movie contract with Metro-Goldwyn-Mayer (MGM) in 1941 and was cast in incidental roles for one year. Then, she began freelancing, ultimately appearing in more than 40 films, including Johnny Eager (1942) and as a slave girl in Arabian Nights (1942). Her screen personality was usually that of a hard-boiled glamour girl, in the manner of the better known Iris Adrian. Her voice and manner were so similar to Adrian's that when PRC's Iris Adrian feature Shake Hands with Murder was successful and the studio wanted a sequel, Adrian was not available, so PRC substituted Robin Raymond (in her one starring role, the 1944 feature Rogues' Gallery.)

One of Raymond's more memorable roles may have been that of good-hearted burlesque dancer Tanya Zakoyla in the film noir The Glass Wall (1953). She appeared in episode 32, "Alpine, Texas", of Trackdown and was featured on the Perry Mason program in the 1957 episode "The Case of the Hesitant Hostess". Raymond also appeared in a 1958 episode of Dragnet, "The Big Perfume Bottle".

== Personal life ==
Raymond married nightclub owner Norman E. Heeb in Las Vegas, Nevada, on June 15, 1941. They were divorced on November 28, 1941. On January 26, 1947, she married multimillionaire Harry A. Epstein in Yuma, Arizona. They were divorced on February 16, 1955.

== Partial filmography ==
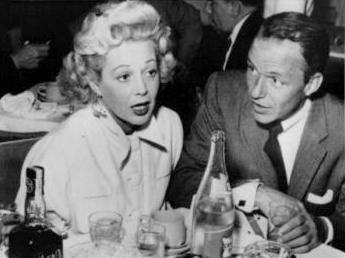
Robin Raymond and Frank Sinatra in 1955

- For Love or Money (1939) - Maid
- Johnny Eager (1941) - Matilda
- Ship Ahoy (1942) - Cigarette Girl (uncredited)
- Moontide (1942) - Mildred
- The Tuttles of Tahiti (1942) - Maitu (uncredited)
- Sunday Punch (1942) - Vicky (uncredited)
- Tortilla Flat (1942) - Woman (uncredited)
- The Affairs of Martha (1942) - Juanita (uncredited)
- Calling Dr. Gillespie (1942) - Bubbles
- Secrets of the Underground (1942) - Marianne Panois
- Arabian Nights (1942) - Slave Girl
- Slightly Dangerous (1943) - Girl (uncredited)
- Girls in Chains (1943) - Rita Randall
- Let's Face It (1943) - Mimi (uncredited)
- Hi'ya, Sailor (1943) - Margie (uncredited)
- His Butler's Sister (1943) - Sunshine Twin
- Standing Room Only (1944) - Assembly Line Worker (uncredited)
- Ladies of Washington (1944) - Vicky O'Reilly
- Ghost Catchers (1944) - Miss Ware (uncredited)
- Are These Our Parents? (1944) - Mona Larson
- Sweet and Low-Down (1944) - Blonde (uncredited)
- Rogues' Gallery (1944) - Patsy Clark (starring role)
- The Clock (1945) - Check Room Attendant (uncredited)
- Men in Her Diary (1945) - Stella
- Tars and Spars (1946) - Recording Studio Pitch Woman (uncredited)
- A Letter for Evie (1946) - Eloise Edgewaters
- Talk About a Lady (1946) - 'Peaches' Barkeley
- The Man I Love (1946) - Lee (uncredited)
- Johnny O'Clock (1947) - Hatcheck Girl (uncredited)
- A Likely Story (1947) - Ticket Girl
- The Web (1947) - Newspaper Librarian
- The Prince of Thieves (1948) - Maude (uncredited)
- French Leave (1948) - Simone
- Mighty Joe Young (1949) - Nightclub Dancer (uncredited)
- Wabash Avenue (1950) - Jennie
- Valentino (1951) - Blonde Waitress (uncredited)
- The Sniper (1952) - Woman Dunked at Carnival Concession (uncredited)
- The Glass Wall (1953) - Tanya aka Bella Zakoyla
- There's No Business Like Show Business (1954) - Lillian Sawyer
- Young at Heart (1954) - Restaurant Patron (uncredited)
- Beyond a Reasonable Doubt (1956) - Terry Larue
- Jailhouse Rock (1957) - Dotty (uncredited)
- High School Confidential (1958) - Kitty
- Wild in the Country (1961) - Flossie
- Twilight of Honor (1963) - Tess Braden
- The Candidate (1964) - Attorney Rogers
- Young Dillinger (1965)
- Pendulum (1969) - Myra
- Adam-12 (1970) - Marnie
- Psychic Killer (1975) - Jury Foreman
- The Black Marble (1980) - Millie
