= Sam's Song =

- Directed by: Jordan Leondopoulos (credited as John Shade)
- Produced by: Christopher C. Dewey
- Starring: Robert De Niro; Jarred Mickey; Jennifer Warren
- Cinematography: Álex Phillips Jr.
- Edited by: Arline Garson
- Music by: Gershon Kingsley
- Production company: Cannon Films
- Release date: May 26, 1969
- Running time: 89 minutes
- Language: English

Sam's Song is a 1969 drama film directed by Jordan Leondopoulos and starring Robert De Niro.

Footage from Sam's Song was edited in 1979 into a completely different film, known as both The Swap and Line of Fire, in which a man investigates the death of his brother.

== Plot ==
A political filmmaker is on Long Island for a weekend during which he becomes entangled with a high-living, jet set crowd. At first, it is exciting, but he soon becomes disillusioned by their shallowness.

== Cast ==
- Robert De Niro as Sam Nicoletti
- Jarred Mickey as Andrew Moore
- Jennifer Warren as Erica Moore
- Sybil Danning as Carol

== Reception ==
The film was described as "a European-influenced movie". New York Magazine commented: "Dull, dull movie about a film editor is salvaged somewhat by early De Niro performance".

== See also ==
- List of American films of 1969
