= Girls in Chains =

1943 film by Edgar George Ulmer

- Original release poster
- Directed by: Edgar G. Ulmer
- Screenplay by: Albert Beich
- Story by: Edgar G. Ulmer
- Produced by: Peter R. Van Duinen
- Starring: Arline Judge
- Cinematography: Ira H. Morgan
- Edited by: Charles Henkel Jr.
- Music by: Leo Erdody
- Distributed by: Producers Releasing Corporation
- Release date: 1943
- Running time: 71 minutes
- Country: United States
- Language: English

Girls in Chains is a 1943 American women-in-prison film directed by Edgar G. Ulmer and starring Arline Judge.

== Plot ==
Johnny Moon is a mob boss who controls things from politicians to a profitable women's reformatory he secretly runs. He has ruined many lives, including that of Helen Martin, a teacher, and her sister Jean.

A political reformer, Frank Donovan, is able to persuade Helen to go undercover behind bars, posing as a teacher of the inmates, to unearth evidence that will prove Moon's abuse of the incarcerated women. She ultimately succeeds, but not before placing her life in grave danger.

== Cast ==
- Arline Judge as Helen Martin
- Roger Clark as Frank Donovan
- Robin Raymond as Rita Randall
- Barbara Pepper as Ruth
- Dorothy Burgess as Mrs. Peters
- Clancy Cooper as Marcus
- Addison Randall as Johnny Moon
- Patricia Knox as Jean Moon
- Sid Melton as Pinkhead
- Russell Gaige as Dalvers
- Emmett Lynn as Lionel Cleeter
- Richard Clarke as Tom Havershield
- Betty Blythe as Mrs. Grey
