= Yetta Zwerling =

American actress

Yetta Zwerling Silverman
- Born: Yetta Zwerling; December 25, 1894; Lemberg, Austria-Hungary
- Died: January 17, 1982 (aged 87); Cedar-Sinai Hospital; Los Angeles, California, United States
- Occupation: Actress

Yetta Zwerling Silverman (December 25, 1894 – January 17, 1982) was a Yiddish movie star during the 1930s and 1940s.

== Early life ==
Yetta Zwerling was born in Kalievo, near Lemberg, Galicia, Austria-Hungary (present-day Choliv, near Lviv, Ukraine). Her father had a fruit business and was also a klezmer. Her sisters Bessie and Mamie sang in the Yiddish theater chorus and brought Yetta in as well.

She emigrated to the United States with her family, finishing high school there and playing juvenile roles in variety theaters and English-language vaudeville. During her vaudeville years she also sang Yiddish songs like Vu Bistu, Yukel? and Bei Mir Bist du Schoen.

== Career ==
Her first "legitimate role" in Yiddish theatre was as Hanele in Isidore Zolotarevsky's Der Yeshiva Bokher (Yeshiva student). She toured and ended up in New York, playing Yiddish vaudeville with Sam Klinetsky at the Grand Theater, then doing four years of English-language comedy with Leon Errol and then six seasons in Philadelphia with Anshel Schorr, who improved her Yiddish and gave her the opportunity to play the soubrette opposite, among others, Celia Adler, Samuel Goldenberg, and Boris Thomashevsky. She then played at the National Theater in Student Prince and with Bertha Kalich in Di neshomeh fun a froy (The Soul of a Woman).

She played alongside Yitskhok Feld, Julius Nathanson, Eli Mintz, Isidore Meltzer, Adof Fenigshtayn, Irving Jacobson, later Menasha Skulnik and Leo Fuchs in Yiddish movies such as Motl der opereytor and Ikh vil zayn a mame. Beyond her comic roles, she sang as a soloist and in duets with her partners. She was also noted for her eccentric outfits and jewels.

== Death ==
In 1982, Yetta Silverman died at Cedar-Sinai Hospital in Los Angeles, California. She was survived by her two sons, Sidney and Arthur Silverman. She was interred at Mount Sinai Memorial Park in Los Angeles.

== Sources ==
- Yetta Zwerling at IMDb
