= Green Fields (film) =

1937 film by Edgar George Ulmer

- Directed by: Jacob Ben-Ami; Edgar G. Ulmer
- Written by: Peretz Hirschbein
- Produced by: Roman Rebush; Ludwig Landy
- Starring: Michael Gorrin; Helen Beverley; Herschel Bernardi
- Cinematography: J. Burgi Contner
- Edited by: Jack Kemp
- Music by: Vladimir Heifetz
- Production company: Collective Film Producers
- Distributed by: New Star Film Company
- Release dates: October 12, 1937 (US); April 17, 1938 (Poland); November 30, 1945 (PEY)
- Running time: 99 minutes
- Country: United States
- Language: Yiddish

Green Fields (Yiddish: גרינע פֿעלדער, trans. Grine Felder) is a 1937 American comedy-drama Yiddish film directed by Edgar G. Ulmer and Jacob Ben-Ami. The film features child actor Herschel Bernardi, later to be an adult star on Broadway, in films and on television.

== Plot ==
Levy Yitzchok is an orphaned yeshiva student. Restless and distressed, he leaves his study hall in search of "real Jews" and wanders through the Belorussian countryside. He eventually settles in a small village, where the only Jews are two peasant families: Dovid-Noich, his wife Rochel, their two sons, Hersh Ber and Avraham Yankov, and daughter Tsine; and Elkone, his wife Gittel and their daughter Stera. Dovid is flattered by the presence of a scholar among the poor unlearned peasants, and invites Levy Yitzchok to stay as a boarder and tutor his two sons in religious studies. The phlegmatic, unworldly Levy is himself fascinated by the farmers' lives and their vitality. He is ashamed by his lack of physical prowess, which is demonstrated when he attempts to aid in field work. Levy secretly develops feelings for the youthful and vivacious Tsine, who is impressed with him and begins to spy on her brothers' lessons; she herself is restricted from attending, but manages to learn to write her own name. Dovid quarrels with his neighbor, and the enraged Elkone cancels his daughter's match with Hersh. He offers Stera's hand to Levy. Elkone brings his daughter to Dovid's house, to annul her relations with the latter's son. She begins crying and Hersh is obviously depressed. The fathers are softened and agree to forget about their clash and allow them to marry. Levy Yitzchok and Tsine reveal their desires to one another, and announce they want their own wedding. The film closes with an ending title stating that from Palestine to Birobidzhan, the Jewish masses are no longer superstitious and subservient before Talmud scholars and that in the fusion of the learned Levy and strong-willed Tsine, "a new Jew is born."

== Cast ==
- Michael Gorrin (Goldstein), as Levy Yitzchok
- Helen Beverley, as Tsine
- Izidor Casher, as Dovid
- Anna Appel, as Rochel
- Max Vodnoy, as Elkone
- Lea Noemi, as Gittel
- Dena Drute, as Stera
- Gonzalo Meroño, as Richard Steward
- Saul Levine, as Hersh
- Herschel Bernardi, as Avraham

== Production ==
On 31 December 1936, Yiddle with His Fiddle opened in New York. Its success convinced producer Roman Rebush that Yiddish cinema had a large potential market. Rebush was joined by distributor Ludwig Landy, and the two hired director Edgar G. Ulmer. He had much experience with the East Coast's ethnic film industry, which manufactured low-cost pictures for immigrants in their native languages. On 4 July 1937 they formed "Collective Film Producers." The company chose to adapt "Green Fields", a play by Peretz Hirschbein which was very popular with Jewish audiences after its 1918 premiere in the Folksbiene. Each one of the three shareholders claimed in later interviews the idea had been his. They approached Hirschbein, who granted permission on one condition: Jacob ben-Ami Shimshirin, who was the most acclaimed actor to portray the lead role of Levi Yizchak, had to reprise it. Ulmer accepted though he knew ben-Ami was much too old. Hirschbein later agreed to forgo his demand and allow ben-Ami to supervise drama as co-director. In a similar fashion to Ulmer's former films in Ukrainian and Spanish, of which he was as ignorant as he was of Yiddish, he would have dealt mainly with technical aspects.

The director later claimed that his budget was no more than $8,000, though at the time of release the figure $30,000 was given. While film scholar J. Hoberman judged his accounts to be somewhat unreliable, he did not contest that Green Fields was made under harsh conditions. Principal photography was performed at Ridgefield, New Jersey in August, taking merely five days according to Ulmer, who told his fee was $300 and that his associates mortgaged their furniture to receive money from Household Finance. Their funds supposedly allowed for purchasing only 15,000 feet of film, forcing a tight shooting ratio of 1.25:1. The actors rehearsed diligently for six weeks prior to commencing shooting, to insure minimal waste of negative. A partner supplied Ulmer with an advanced portable Mitchell Camera (BNC model), which enabled him to conduct sessions outside. They were in deep debt, and reached a settlement with International Ladies' Garment Workers' Union boss David Dubinsky. He bought 75,000 tickets in advance for ¢40 each, which he could sell at any price while Collective Film pledged not to sell any during the opening week. Ulmer stated that all three major Yiddish newspapers in New York, Morgen Freiheit, Der Tog and The Jewish Daily Forward, offered sponsorship but he turned each down fearing he would antagonize the other two.

== Reception ==
Collective Film was offered $25,000 by Loews in exchange for full rights, but chose independent distribution. Ulmer approached the owner of the new Squire cinema and gave him 20% of incomes for a ten-week run. Green Fields became a massive success and played for two months in New York. One contemporary observer, journalist Nathan Meisels, reported it was screened in seventy different cinemas in the city and viewed by over a million people. Yiddish press critics praised it voluminously: William Edlin of Der Tog wrote it "can be shown in theaters throughout the world, as are well-made movies from France, Czechoslovakia or Hungary." So did the Daily Worker and other Socialist newspapers. Frank S. Nugent of the New York Times, in contrast, wrote that it was "too long, and it betrays Jacob Ben-Ami's stage-bound direction... The picture unquestionably would have profited by having a different leading man. Goldstein carries unworldliness to the point of imbecility." Joseph Green imported Green Fields to Poland, and it premiered at Fama cinema, in Warsaw's Nalewki district, on 17 April 1938. With Hebrew dubbing, it opened in the British Mandate of Palestine on 30 November 1938, in Jerusalem's E'den cinema.

While exact sale records are unknown, Green Fields is probably the most commercially successful Yiddish film ever, rivaled only by Yiddle, and unquestionably the most popular American one. Its immediate effect was to have Collective Film determine to make another picture in the language, and the trio produced three further: The Singing Blacksmith (1938), The Light Ahead (1939) and Americaner Shadchen (1940). Along with Yiddle, The Dybbuk, Tevya and several others, it is one of the hallmarks of the brief golden age enjoyed by Yiddish cinema on the eve of World War II. Ulmer stated Green Fields won a prize in a French festival, but film scholar Chantal Michel could not verify it.

The picture had been shown at a number of film festivals and screenings. In 2004, it was reeled at the Rhode Island International Film Festival, Museum of Jewish Heritage. In 2005, it was screened at the Haifa Jewish Film Festival and Toronto Jewish Film Festival.
