= Jive Junction =

- Theatrical release poster
- Directed by: Edgar G. Ulmer
- Screenplay by: Irving Wallace; Walter Doniger; Malvin Wald
- Story by: Malvin Wald; Walter Doniger
- Produced by: Leon Fromkess
- Starring: Dickie Moore; Tina Thayer; Gerra Young; John Michaels; Jack Wagner; Jan Wiley
- Cinematography: Ira H. Morgan
- Edited by: Robert O. Crandall
- Music by: Leo Erdody
- Production company: Producers Releasing Corporation
- Distributed by: Producers Releasing Corporation
- Release date: December 16, 1943
- Running time: 62 minutes
- Country: United States
- Language: English

Jive Junction is a 1943 American comedy film directed by Edgar G. Ulmer and written by Irving Wallace, Walter Doniger and Malvin Wald. The film stars Dickie Moore, Tina Thayer, Gerra Young, John Michaels, Jack Wagner and Jan Wiley. The film was released on December 16, 1943, by Producers Releasing Corporation.

== Plot ==
The young musician Peter Crane is transferred from the conservatory to a regular secondary school. There his music comes into conflict with the modern music of high school students. When he finds out that his father was killed in the war, he turns to jive. He soon leads his school's music group.

== Cast ==
- Dickie Moore as Peter Crane
- Tina Thayer as Claire Emerson
- Gerra Young as Gerra Young
- John Michaels as Jimmy Emerson
- Jack Wagner as Grant Saunders
- Jan Wiley as Miss Forbes
- Beverly Boyd as Cubby
- William Halligan as Mr. Maglodian
- Johnny Duncan as Frank
- Johnny Clark as Chick
- Friedrich Feher as Frederick Feher
- Caral Ashley as Mary
- Odessa Lauren as Girl
- Robert McKenzie as Sheriff
