= Ruthless (1948 film) =

1948 film by Edgar George Ulmer

- Theatrical release poster
- Directed by: Edgar G. Ulmer
- Screenplay by: Alvah Bessie; S.K. Lauren; Gordon Kahn
- Based on: the novel Prelude to Night by Dayton Stoddart
- Produced by: Arthur S. Lyons
- Starring: Zachary Scott; Louis Hayward; Diana Lynn; Sydney Greenstreet
- Cinematography: Bert Glennon
- Edited by: Francis D. Lyon
- Music by: Werner Janssen
- Production company: Producing Artists
- Distributed by: Eagle-Lion Films
- Release date: April 16, 1948 (United States)
- Running time: 104 minutes
- Country: United States
- Language: English

Ruthless is a 1948 American film noir drama film directed by Edgar G. Ulmer starring Zachary Scott, Sydney Greenstreet and Louis Hayward.

== Plot ==
Horace Vendig shows himself to the world as a rich philanthropist. In fact, the history of his rise from his unhappy broken home shows this to be far from true. After being taken in by richer neighbors he started to exhibit an obsessive and selfish urge to make more and more money, loving and leaving women at will to further this end.

== Cast ==
- Zachary Scott as Horace Vendig
- Louis Hayward as Vic Lambdin
- Diana Lynn as Martha / Mallory
- Sydney Greenstreet as Mansfield
- Lucille Bremer as Christa Mansfield
- Martha Vickers as Susan Duane
- Dennis Hoey as Mr. Burnside
- Edith Barrett as Mrs. Burnside
- Raymond Burr as Peter Vendig
- Joyce Arling as Kate Vendig
- Charles Evans as Bruce McDonald
- Bob Anderson as Horace as a child
- Arthur Stone as Vic as a child
- Ann Carter as Martha as a child
- Edna Holland as Libby Sims
- Frederick Worlock as J. Norton Sims
- Claire Carleton as Bella

== Critical reception ==
At the time of its release, the staff at Variety magazine panned the film: "Despite a sextet of name players, Ruthless is a victim of clichéd and outmoded direction and of weary dialog to which no actor could do justice. Performances are handicapped by the direction of Edgar G. Ulmer. Adaptation from the Dayton Stoddart novel, Prelude to Night, is involved and confusing. Plot’s denouement is also telegraphed long before the finale. Hayward contribs a fair interpretation of Scott’s associate, who eventually breaks from him. Diana Lynn, in a dual role, is wistful and appealing as a pawn in Scott’s affections. Sydney Greenstreet, cast as a utilities magnate who’s ousted by Scott, tends to overact."

In 2013, film critic Glenn Erickson gave the film a positive review, writing, "Financed as a one-shot project by an agent-turned producer, Ruthless plays its quietly subversive theme right out to the bitter end. It has excellent performances by a cast of not-quite big stars, some of them recently relieved of studio contracts. Its main player is the biggest surprise: Zachary Scott gives the performance of his career ... Ruthless is the Edgar G. Ulmer picture that shows him operating with a decent set of cinematic Tinkertoys, and he does very well indeed."
