= Jacob Ben-Ami =

Russian-American actor and director (1890–1977)

- Джэйкаб Бэн-Амі; Якоб Бен-Ами; יעקב בן־עמי
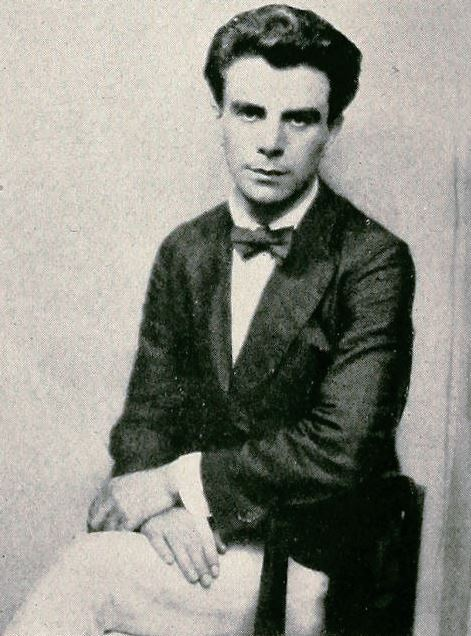
- Ben-Ami in the February 1923 issue of Shadowland magazine
- Born: Yakob Lazarovich Schirin; December 23, 1890; Minsk, Russian Empire
- Died: July 2, 1977 (aged 86); New York City, US
- Occupations: Actor; theatre director; Film director
- Spouse: Slava Estrin (m. 1909; died 1966)
- Children: 1
- Relatives: Paula Bauersmith (sister-in-law); Jennifer Warren (niece)

Jacob Schirin Ben-Ami (né Yakob Lazarovich Schirin; December 23, 1890 – July 2, 1977) was a Russian-American actor, theatre and film director. A leading figure in American Yiddish theatre, Ben-Ami founded the Jewish Art Theater in 1919.

== Early life ==
Ben-Ami was born Yakob Lazarovich Schirin (Belarusian: Якаў Лазаравіч Шчырын; Russian: Яков Лазарович Щирин) (Note: Also transliterated as Shtshirin and Shimshirin.) on December 23, 1890 (Note: Also cited as November 23 1890.) in Minsk, Minsk Governorate (present-day Belarus) to Sara Schirin (Note: Also cited as Sara Ben-Ami.) (later Sarah Warren) and Lazar Schirin. Ben-Ami had at least two siblings.

Educated at a cheder, Ben-Ami continued his education at a private school. As a child Ben-Ami sang with Hazzans, as well as for Russian-language theatre.

== Career ==
=== Russian Empire ===
In 1907, aged 17, Ben-Ami became an extra at either the Minsk municipal Russian Theatre or the Moscow Art Theatre. Following the 1908 repeal of the 1883 Russian imperial edict which outlawing the performance of plays in Yiddish, Ben-Ami joined Sam Adler-Meerson Yiddish theater troupe. Initially an understudy, Ben-Ami later played minor roles before being let go by Adler. Ben-Ami then joined the Yiddish theater troupe of Mittleman (Note: Possibly Aaron Mittelman), and began to play larger roles. Following the merge of the two troupes, Ben-Ami remained with the new troupe for a year. In 1909, Ben-Ami met Peretz Hirschbein in Odesa and together founded the Hirschbein Troupe which aimed to showcase high quality Yiddish drama. Ben-Ami worked for the Troupe as both an actor and theatre director.

Following the disbanding of the Hirschbein Troupe, Ben-Ami relocated to Vilna, Vilna Governorate (present-day Vilnius, Lithuania) and worked as a theatre director for the Yiddish Dramatic Amateur Circle (from which later developed the Vilna Troupe). In 1912, Ben-Ami was invited by Sigmund Feinman to be the director and leading actor at the Feinman's Yiddish People's Theatre in London. However, Feinman's was closed down after only four months and Ben-Ami was subsequently invited by Sara Adler to join her troupe in New York City.

=== United States ===
As part of Adler's troupe Ben-Ami performed in Di Kreytser sonata (Note: Also cited as The Green Maiden.) at the Novelty Theater in Brooklyn. However, the Novelty Theater closed down midseason and Ben-Ami subsequently joined the actor’s union. In 1913, Ben-Ami joined Boris Thomashefsky and performed in Der ewiger wanderer by Osip Dymov.

In 1919, Ben-Ami founded the New Yiddish Theatre (Yiddish: Dos Naye Yidisher Teater), known in English as the Jewish Art Theater. Ben-Ami's first English-language production was the 1920 Broadway play Samson and Delilah. According to biographer Alan Gansberg in Little Caesar: A Biography of Edward G. Robinson, Ben-Ami earned fellow cast member Robinson's disdain by allegedly trying to upstage the other actors and overacting. Both the play and Ben-Ami, however, were hits. In her 1921 review of the production, Dorothy Parker proclaimed him "one of the greatest actors on the stage today." He was also lauded by John Barrymore ("inspired"), The New York Times, and Alexander Woollcott ("the cocktail question of the year was 'Ben-Ami or not Ben-Ami'"), among others.

He had much less success in Eugene O'Neill's 1924 play Welded, in which he starred. Among other problems, the style of play did not suit Ben-Ami, and he had a thick accent. Welded closed after three weeks and 24 performances.

As an established star, Ben-Ami helped the then-unknown John Garfield get accepted into the American Laboratory Theater.

He co-directed the 1937 film Green Fields with Edgar G. Ulmer and appeared in the films The Wandering Jew (Note: Not be confused with The Wandering Jew) (1933) and Esperanza (1949), and on television.

On March 9, 1943, he starred in a mass memorial service to the 2,000,000 Jews who had, up to that date, been murdered by the Nazis in Europe. The service, staged at Madison Square Garden in New York, was called We Will Never Die and attracted 40,000 people during its two performances.

Ben-Ami filmed a scene for the 1958 film The Young Lions, in which he played the father of his friend Montgomery Clift's character. It would have marked his English-language film debut, but the scene was deleted. Ben-Ami's last Broadway role was as the Foreman in The Tenth Man, which ran from November 5, 1959, to May 13, 1961.

== Personal life ==
In April 1909, Ben-Ami married Slava Estrin (1889–1966), an actress and later translator and journalist, in Saint Petersburg. The couple had one son. Ben-Ami was the brother-in-law of the actress Paula Bauersmith, and the paternal uncle of the actress and film director Jennifer Warren.

On July 2, 1977, Ben-Ami died in New York City, at the age of 86.

== Stage and screen ==
=== Screen ===
Year	Title	Role	Notes	Ref.
1933	The Wandering Jew (Der Vanderer Yid)	Arthur Levi		
1937	Green Fields (Grine Felder)		Co-directed with Edgar G. Ulmer	
1949	Esperanza			
1958	The Young Lions	Noah's father	Scene deleted	

=== Stage ===
Year	Title	Role	Venue	Notes	Ref.
1920–1921	Samson and Delilah	Peter Krumback	Greenwich Village Theatre	Written by Sven Lange, translated by Samuel S. Grossman	
1921–1922	The Idle Inn	Eisik	Plymouth Theatre	Written by Peretz Hirshbein, translated by Isaac Goldberg and Louis Wolheim	
1922–1923	Johannes Kreisler	Johannes Kreisler	Apollo Theater	Written by Louis N. Parker	
1923–1924	The Failures	He	Garrick Theatre	Written by Henri-René Lenormand, translated by Winifred Katzin	
1924	Welded	Michael Cape	39th Street Theatre	Written by Eugene O'Neill	
1924	Man and the Masses	The Nameless One	Garrick Theatre	Written by Ernst Toller, translated by Louis Untermeyer	
1926	The Goat Song		Guild Theatre	Director. Written by Franz Werfel, translated by Ruth Langner	
1926	Schweiger	Franz Schweiger	Mansfield Theatre	Also staged. Written by Franz Schweiger, translated by Jack Charash and William A. Drake	
1927	John	John	Klaw Theatre	Written by Philip Barry	
1928	Diplomacy	Count Orloff	Erlanger's Theatre		
1929	The Seagull	Trigorin	Civic Repertory Theatre		
1929	The Cherry Orchard	Epikhodov, Semen Panteleevich	Civic Repertory Theatre		
1929	The Living Corpse	Fedya	Civic Repertory Theatre	Also staged.	
1930	Romeo and Juliet	Escalus	Civic Repertory Theatre		
1930	The Green Cockatoo	Henri	Civic Repertory Theatre		
1930	Siegfried	Siegfried	Civic Repertory Theatre		
1931	Camellia	M. Duval	Civic Repertory Theatre	Translation by Henriette Alice McCrea-Metcalf	
1933	Evensong	Arthur Kober	Selwyn Theatre		
1934	A Ship Comes In	Dr. Victor Bard	Morosco Theatre; Longacre Theatre	Written by Joseph Anthony	
1936	Bitter Stream		Civic Repertory Theatre	Staged by. Written by Victor Wolfson	
1946	A Flag Is Born	Tevya	Adelphi Theatre; Music Box Theatre; Broadway Theatre	Replacement for Paul Muni with Luther Adler	
1958	The Infernal Machine	The Old Shepherd	Phoenix Theatre		
1959–1961	The Tenth Man	Foreman	Booth Theatre (1959–1961); Ambassador Theatre (1961)	Written by Paddy Chayefsky	

== Hamlet in Argentine Yiddish Theater ==
Jacob Ben-Ami as Hamlet in Teatro Soleil. Buenos Aires.1930s. Foto: Courtesy of Prof Dr. Susana Skura.
