= Jennifer Warren =

American actress and film director

- Warren in Serpico, 1976
- Born: August 12, 1941 (age 85); New York City, U.S.
- Education: University of Wisconsin
- Occupations: Actress; director; producer
- Years active: 1969–2009
- Spouse: Roger Gimbel (m. 1976; died 2011)
- Children: 1
- Mother: Paula Bauersmith
- Relatives: Jacob Ben-Ami (uncle); Richard Gimbel (father-in-law)

Jennifer Warren (born August 12, 1941) is an American actress, producer and film director.

== Early life and education ==
Born in New York City on August 12, 1941, Warren is the daughter of Barnett M. Warren, a dentist and playwright, and Paula Bauersmith, an actress. The younger of two siblings, she is the sister of Paul Warren, an educator and professor.

Warren's father was born in Minsk, Minsk Governorate (present-day Belarus), and was the younger brother of the actor, theatre and film director Jacob Ben-Ami.

Warren attended the University of Wisconsin, class of 1963, where she majored in art history; she was also a prominent member of the school's Wisconsin Players, in which she served as "vice president, play circle" for at least one semester, and wherein, during her senior year, she portrayed the title character's daughter in Bertolt Brecht's Galileo.

== Career ==
Warren made her Broadway debut in 1972 in 6 Rms Riv Vu, for which she won a Theatre World Award. She appeared in the short-lived Broadway production of P.S. Your Cat Is Dead! Warren's film credits include Sam's Song (1969), Night Moves (1975), Slap Shot (1977, as the frustrated wife of hockey player Paul Newman), Another Man, Another Chance (1977), Ice Castles (1978), Mutant (1984), and Fatal Beauty (1987). She was listed as one of the 12 "Promising New Actors of 1975" in John Willis' Screen World, Volume 27. She also played a role in Steel Cowboy (1978). Her television credits include guest roles on The Bob Newhart Show, Kojak, Cagney & Lacey, Hotel, Hooperman, Murder, She Wrote, and others. She had a featured role as Dinah Caswell, a former model and mother of an aspiring model, in the 1982 TV movie Paper Dolls, and the 1984 television series based on the movie. Warren also played Ria Parkinson in the pilot for an American version of the British sitcom Butterflies. Broadcast in 1979, no series was commissioned.

In 1994, Warren released her directorial debut, The Beans of Egypt, Maine, starring Martha Plimpton, Kelly Lynch and Rutger Hauer. Warren finished production on Partners in Crime, her second directorial feature, once again starring Hauer, with Paulina Porizkova, in 1998. The film was distributed in America by Artisan Films during the 1999/2000 year and appeared on Direct TV. A member of the Academy of Motion Picture Arts and Sciences and Women in Film, she was a founding member and past president of the Alliance of Woman Directors and continues to support the organization. She has taught at Wesleyan University, Johns Hopkins University, UCLA Extension, and the University of Tel Aviv. She is an associate professor at USC's School of Cinematic Arts.

In 1997, Warren co-founded the Alliance of Women Directors.

== Personal life ==
On 6 June 1976, Warren married the producer Roger Gimbel, with whom she had one son. Warren was the daughter-in-law of Richard Gimbel.

== Selected filmography ==
- Sam's Song (1969) as Erica Moore
- Night Moves (1975) as Paula
- Banjo Hackett: Roamin’ Free (1976) as Mollie Brannen
- Slap Shot (1977) as Francine Dunlop
- Another Man, Another Chance (1977) as Mary Williams
- Ice Castles (1978) as Deborah Mackland
- Freedom (1981) as Rachel Bellow
- Mutant (1984) as Dr. Myra Tate
- Fatal Beauty (1987) as Cecile Jaeger
