= American Matchmaker =

1940 film

- Directed by: Edgar G. Ulmer
- Starring: Leo Fuchs; Judith Abarbanel; Judel Dubinsky; Anna Guskin; Celia Brodkin; Rosetta Bialis; Abraham Lax; Esther Adler; Sarah Krohner
- Edited by: Hans E. Mandl
- Music by: Sam Morgenstern
- Release date: 6 May 1940
- Running time: 87 min.
- Country: United States
- Languages: English; Yiddish

American Matchmaker, or אמעריקאנער שדכן (Americaner Shadchen) is a 1940 Yiddish-language American comedy film directed by Edgar G. Ulmer and starring Leo Fuchs (known as "the Yiddish Fred Astaire"), Judith Abarbanel, Judel Dubinsky and Anna Guskin. The film's music was composed by Sam Morgenstern and its screenplay was written by Shirley Kassler Ulmer under the name Shirle Castle.

American Matchmaker was restored by the National Center for Jewish Film, the largest archive of Jewish film outside of Israel.

== Cast ==
- Leo Fuchs
- Judith Abarbanel
- Judel Dubinsky
- Anna Guskin
- Celia Brodkin
- Rosetta Bialis
- Abraham Lax
- Esther Adler
- Sarah Krohner
