= Pepi Litman =

Yiddish vaudeville singer (1876–1930)

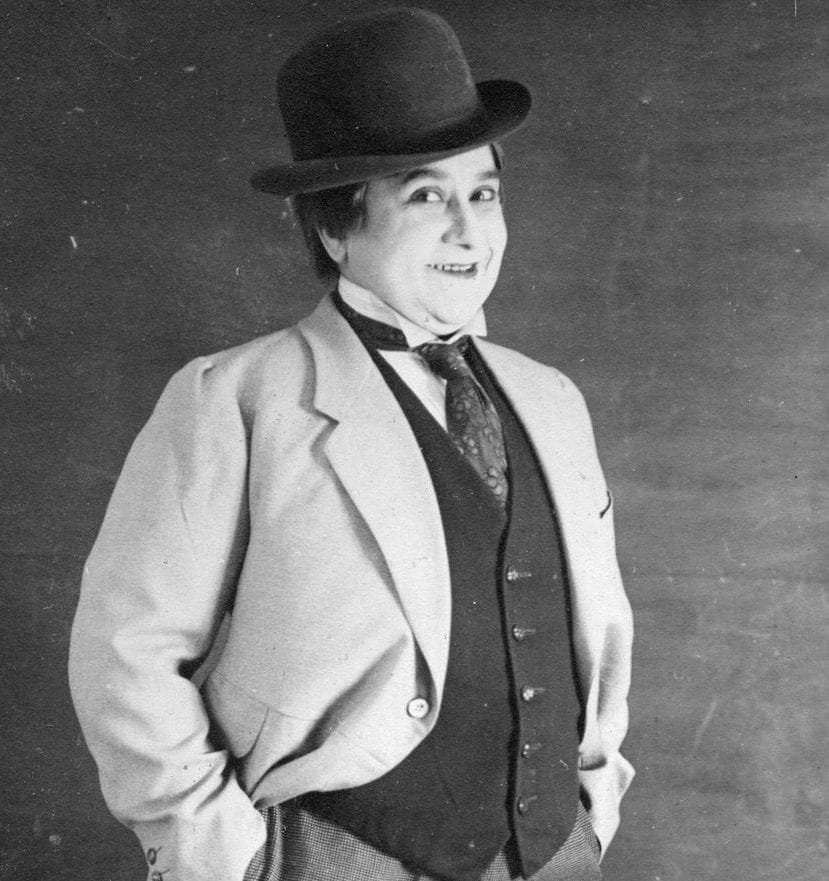
- Litman, c. 1910s
- Born: Pesha Kahane c. 1876; Tarnopol, Eastern Galicia
- Died: 13 September 1930 (aged 55–56); Vienna

Pepi Litman (Yiddish: פּעפּי ליטמאַן, born Pesha Kahane; c. 1876 – 13 September 1930) was a cross-dressing female Yiddish vaudeville singer associated with the Broderzinger movement. Litman led a popular traveling theater troupe around Europe, performing highly satirical songs while costumed as a male Hasidic Jew. Because she frequently performed while costumed as a young boy or as a male dandy, she is considered a proto-drag king performer. Pepi Litman made numerous 78rpm recordings which capture her energetic and virtuosic singing style, and which also stand as a document of Jewish life in Eastern Europe.

== Early life ==
Litman was born to poor Jewish parents in Tarnopol, a city in eastern Galicia (now in Ukraine). The region was part of the Austro-Hungarian Empire, where Jews were relatively free to work and travel. However, a poor Jewish girl with no dowry faced very limited prospects in nineteenth-century Eastern Europe, usually working uncompensated all her life to support her parents, husband, children and in-laws.

In her youth, Litman worked as a maid in a theatrical boarding house run by the parents of Max Badin, an actor who later appeared in American Yiddish films. Since she had a good singing voice she soon got involved with the itinerant Yiddish vaudevillians known as the Broderzingers.

The Broderzingers are credited with creating the earliest form of secular Yiddish theater in East European pubs, cafes, and wine gardens. Their performances combined elements of the traditional rabbinical court jester, the badkhn (master of ceremonies at a Yiddish wedding), and the Purimshpil (traditional holiday plays, usually performed privately by amateurs, with cross-dressing, satire, and bawdy songs). Besides providing comic entertainment, the Broderzingers were influenced by the Jewish Enlightenment, or Haskalah, to advocate on behalf of modernization, education and emancipation for Jews. Some Broderzinger songs satirized Hasidism; others were sung from the point of view of working-class proste yidn (Yiddish: simple folk) such as nightwatchmen, water carriers, gravediggers, housemaids and beggars.

Pepi married a bandleader and Broderzinger, Jacob Litman or Littman, who ran his own travelling theatre troupe. After his death she took over the troupe herself, touring around inns, small towns, health spas, cities and even private homes in Russia, Poland, Germany, Austria, Hungary, and Rumania.

== Eyewitness accounts ==
According to eyewitness accounts cited by Zalmen Zylbercweig's Leksikon fun Yidishn Teater (Lexicon of the Yiddish Theatre), Pepi Litman spoke several languages, frequented literary Yiddish circles, and observed Jewish law as much as she could on the road, by keeping kosher and lighting Shabes candles.

Jacob Mestel, a co-editor of the Leksikon, called her "a chansonette in Hasidic trousers."

Zylbercweig quotes another eyewitness account:

"Dressed as a Hasid, in a big fur hat above curly peyes framing her round, full feminine face, in a wide unbuttoned coat with short trousers, white socks and pumps, with her hands twirling her peyes, she would burst from behind the curtains singing; and instantly, like lightning, set the audience on fire, both on the floor and in the balconies—as choirboys and merchants, tailors and doctors, maids and madames caught on to her melodies and sang along with her.

"Pepi Litman had a masculine voice, deep and hoarse, but anyone who once heard her 'Yismekhu' could never forget it."

In 1910, journalist M. J. Landa reviewed Litman's performance in Lemberg, Poland as part of a "Zydowska Kabaretu" [Polish: "Jewish Cabaret"]. Landa wrote:

"She was the 'star' of the program.....The moment she stepped on the stage, dressed as a Galician youth, with skull cap and ringlets, the whole atmosphere of the room was different. It was dominated by a personality.....Frankly, I do not think I have heard a female comic singer with a voice of greater power and possibility. I preferred it to the cultured voice of the lady in a black evening dress who crooned operatic airs with ease and effect, and afterward wheedled members of the audience into buying her portrait postcards. Pepi Littmnn's voice is a rich, clear mezzo of operatic fullness and breadth and there are moments when it is quite thrilling. At others, again, it sounds almost harsh — this when she is engaged in repartee with her audience. She banters and expostulates with her hearers, always good humoredly and seems to take as much delight in her singing and in her patter as they do. She is the incarnation of the joyous spirit of the Jew, with moments of pathos and sentiment. Listening to her singing of "Shabbos After Table" and "Kol Yisrael Chaverim,' and also an amusing ditty about the Messiah coming in an automobile, I forgot that I was in Galicia—forgot the horrible depressing poverty with which I had been surrounded for some days...."

== Career & associates ==
From about 1905 to 1930, Litman performed in Germany (especially in spa towns like Marienbad and Karlsbad), Hungary (in Budapest), Poland (especially in Lemberg/Lviv), Russia (especially in Odessa), and probably in America, since she recorded several 78 rpm discs in New York.

She performed both comic and serious songs, in a broad Galitsyaner Yiddish dialect, sometimes in a Germanized form of Yiddish called daytshmerish. She recorded a number of songs, both in Lemberg, Budapest, and in New York. Pepi Litman also worked closely with Broderzinger, author and composer Shloyme Pryzament.

During World War I, Litman primarily performed in and around Odessa, where she found a following in literary circles. She was frequently a guest of Yiddish writer and editor David Frishman and author Mendele Mocher Sforim.

== Death ==
Litman returned to performing in Vienna in 1928, mapping out a route that included Karlsbad, Marienbad, and Poland. She became quite ill after this tour, and, after a stay at the Rothschild Hospital, she died on 13 September 1930. Her funeral was arranged by the Vienna Yiddish Artists Union and her burial plot was donated by the Jewish community.
