= Oscar Zehngut =

Violinist and recording artist

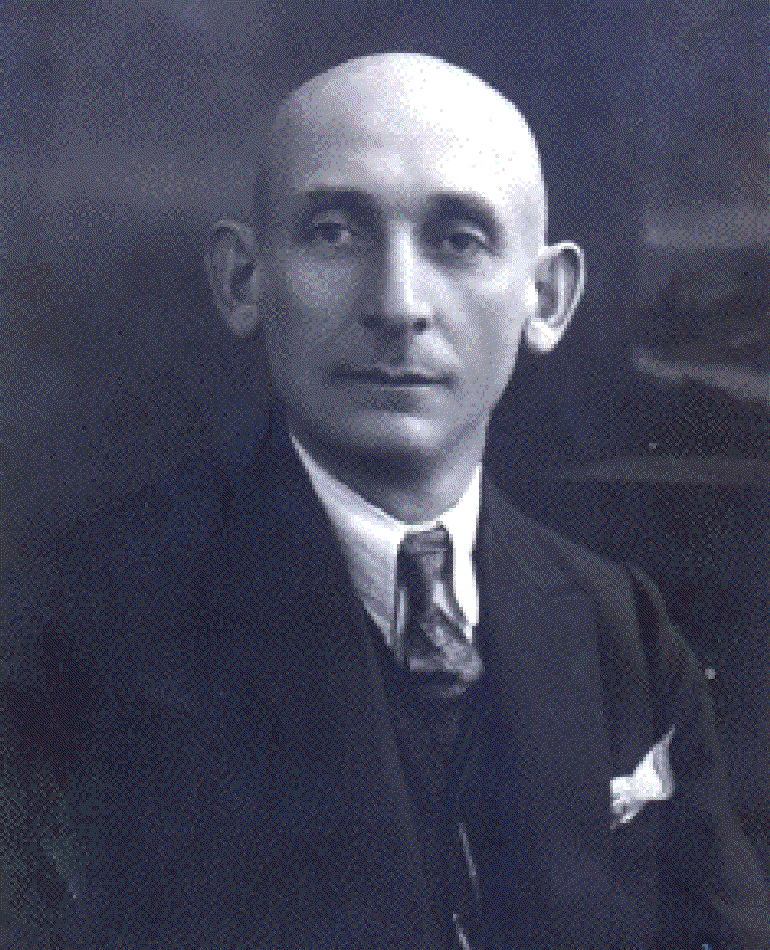
Oscar Zehngut

Oscar Zehngut (Yiddish: שיעלע צעהנגוט Shayele Tsehngut, Polish: Ozjasz Zehngut, c.1874–19??) was an Austro-Hungarian violinist, Yiddish theatre arranger and recording artist. He was one of a handful of violinists to record klezmer music in Europe before World War I, as well as a number of discs where he accompanies Yiddish theatre singers.

== Biography ==
Oscar was born as Ozjasz (Shayele) Zehngut in Galicia, Austria-Hungary, probably in Rzeszów or nearby Leżajsk in 1874. His father, Alter Zehngut, was a badchen and klezmer musician, and his mother was named Ester. His brother Zygmunt later became a well-known entrepreneur and hotel operator in Lemberg (Lviv). His niece, Gizi Heyden-Prizament, would later marry the Yiddish theatre figure Shloyme Prizament. Oscar seems to have married his first wife Roisa Etla Schönwetter in Rzeszów in the 1890s; they had a number of children while living there including Fannie (Feige, born 1896), Rose (Roza, born 1897), Malke Perl (born 1899), Reba (Rachela, born c. 1899-1900), Ewa (born 1902), and Helen (Hannah, born c. 1910-11).

Oscar studied the violin, and seems to have had some classical training in Lemberg in addition to his family education in Jewish music. For a time he was a traveling accompanist for Broder singer artists. He was also an arranger, musical director and bandleader for some Yiddish theatre troupes in Galicia, including those of Norbert Glimer, Moshe Richter, and Bert Hart. He also became well-known as a violin soloist in Lemberg, and toured in Vienna, Budapest, and elsewhere in Austria-Hungary. His recording career seems to be concentrated around 1909, when he recorded a number of discs for Favorite Records of Hanover; some of these were solo klezmer pieces but most were of him accompanying a Yiddish-language singer on violin.

In 1921 Oscar's first wife Etta, who he had divorced, emigrated to Philadelphia since her brother lived there. Oscar may have been remarried to the Yiddish theatre singer and actress Helene Gespass, although this is disputed.

In 1924 Oscar launched a variety series in Lemberg called Shiyeles Variete which starred Broder-zinger style performers. In 1932 Oscar's nephew, Fredrick "Fredzio" Zehngut, who was a professional dancer, was killed in a personal dispute while living in Nice.

The circumstances of his later life and death are unknown.

== Legacy ==
In the 1970s and 1980s there was increased interest in rediscovering and exploring old klezmer music recordings as part of the Klezmer revival. Zehngut, along with H. Steiner, Joseph Solinski, and other European klezmer violinists became the source for tone and techniques for a younger generation of musicians. In addition, there has been growing speculation among klezmer scholars that the recording artist known as Joseph Solinski may have been Zehngut recording under a pseudonym.

== Selected recordings ==
- Chusid Kaffehaus/Hantige Welt (with S. Steiner, Favorite Records, 1908)
- Ein brivale der mamen/Waber, Waber (with Abraham Rosenstein, Favorite Records 1908)
- Orientalische Motive 1 and 2 (Victor Records, 1909)
- Der Badchen/O soj hot mein tate auch gemacht (with J. Reissman, Favorite Records c. 1909)
