= Shloyme Prizament =

Jewish composer and actor (c. 1882–1952)

Shloyme Prizament (1889–1973) (also Shlomo or Szlojme Prizament or Szlomo Prizment), Jewish composer, actor in the Yiddish theater, and badkhn, son of Moyshe Prizament (a famous badkhn known as Moyshe Hibiner / Hibnever).

== Early years ==
Born in Uhniv, Galicia, Austria-Hungary, Prizament moved to Lemberg (Lviv) as a child. When he was 16 his father died and he then supported the other 12 children in the family by becoming a badkhn himself, using his father's writings (scripts). Prizament wrote for Gershom Bader's Der yidisher folks-kalendar and began writing songs and instrumental music for Yiddish theatre.

He is known as a transitional figure since he also wrote for the last of the broder-zingers - Salcia Weinberg, Jule Glantz, Helena Geshpas and Pepi Litman (1874–1930), characterized as "a Jewish chanteuse in Hasidic trousers", for whom he wrote Lomir beyde davenen fun eyn makhzer (Let’s Both Pray from One Prayer Book). He later collected and arranged songs from other surviving Broder Singers. Bin ikh mir a klezmerl (I’m a Little Musician) was also written in that genre.

== Later career ==
Prizament also acted, directed, and wrote plays and song, both music and lyrics. He began directing for Ber Hart's traveling troupe. Two of his famous operettas are Di blumen-kenign (The Flower Queen) and Di tsigaynerin (The Gypsy Girl).

He wrote music for operettas, his first being Joseph Lateiner's Khosn-Kale (Groom and Bride), a show which played in Kraków with Yidl Gutman and in New York with couplets by Sigmund Mogulesko and music by Louis Friedsell. His first acting role was in Jacob Mikhailovich Gordin's Yiddish King Lear and he stuck with acting, spending less time directing orchestras.

In 1910 he was made director of the Ukrainska Besida Theater but soon left again to travel Galicia with wandering theater troupes, thence to Argentina where he wrote in Yidisher Soykher (Jewish Merchant) In 1912 he played as a comic and directed under Meltzer in Romania and worked with Zigmund Faynman in Gordin's repertory company. During the Romanian Bulgarian war foreigners were expelled from Romania; Prizament went back to Galicia and traveled with the Glimer troupe and his brother, Jacob Prizament, until the outbreak of the first World War.

He was a soldier on the Italian and Russian fronts and arrived in Vienna in 1918 where he opened a Yiddish theater called "Bemishn Hof" - but after losing a permit to play he moved on to Budapest and joined the troupe "Shtramer, Rabinovitsh, Vayts, Sheyn" and played until Miklós Horthy's regime forbade Yiddish theater. He went back to Vienna and opened a Miniature-Theater and composed, with Avish Meysels, a version of the Golem of Prague.

In 1923 he began touring Bratislava, Czechoslovakia and Poland, working in the HaOr troupe. He met and married Gizi Hajdn, a singer and relative of violinist Oscar Zehngut, and worked in Galicia. In 1925 he starred in Warsaw's Kaminski Theater for a season, at the same time writing music and lyrics for the operetta Di Galitsianer Mume and for Moyshe Rikhter's Di tsvey shvigers.

He worked at the Sambatiyon revi-teater in 1927, writing music for several shows. In 1928 he worked in the Azazel-Sambatiyon ensemble as music director, and then worked in Romania, where he played in theaters and kleynkunst productions, then going back to Vienna and then Poland. He was Yitskhok Nozhik's closest collaborator. Some of the songs he wrote for these revues are often now presumed to be folk songs, e.g. Dire-gelt (Rent Money), Der rebbe hot geheysn freylekh zayn "(The Rabbi calls us to be merry)" and Dos redl dreyt zikh "(The Wheel Turns)".

He wrote a piece called In Hitler-Land in 1933; it played in Warsaw's Kaminski Theater. In 1938 he played in Lemberg's summer theater's production of Shray, Israel (Cry out, Israel) and worked with VYKT for which he wrote a musical score to Abraham Goldfaden's Shulamis in Zygmunt Turkow's production, and to Israel Ashendorf's Broder Zinger. Some of his other works were Lemberg far der milkhome (Lemberg before the war), A moyd fun provints (A Girl from the Sticks) and many works translated from other languages.

Prizament also wrote a few hundred songs and couplets. He survived the second World War by escaping to the Soviet Union. After 1949 he lived in Buenos Aires, Argentina.

== See also ==
- Yiddish Forverts of Nov. 28 - Dec. 4, 2008: article by Chana Mlotek, Shlomo Prizament - A Yerushe Fun Di Broder-Zinger - Tsu Zayn 35stn Yortseyt (A legacy of the Broder-Zingers - on the occasion of the 35th anniversary of his death). Includes a version of his "Itsikl Hot Chasene Gehat" sung by the Broder Singers.
