= Sambatiyon =

Yiddish theatre in the Interwar Poland

Sambatiyon, a kleynkunst company founded in Vilna, Poland in June 1926, was called by its founders a "Jewish literary-artistic revue theater." Sambatiyon's founder, Yitshkhok Nozhik, wrote: "Clumsy American produced operettas, which are mostly melodramas or complete tragedies with song and dance, no longer interest our audience. Also, our actors want to be free of the type of theater in which simultaneously act and sing and dance in the same role." An evening at revi-teater consisted of 10-12 one-act plays, skits, and songs, with an intermission.

Under the leadership of Moyshe Karpinovitsh, Sambation was created at Vilna's Folk-teater. Leyb Shriftzetser was marshalik (conferencier, master of ceremonies); other participants were M. Triling, M. Turevitsh, Franya Vinter, M. Shapiro, Ester Lipovska, L. Yulin, Zlatke Yaroslavska and Aneta Reyzer. Shmuel Veynberg was music director, Władysław Weintraub was set designer.

By August Nozhik moved the troupe to Warsaw; Herman Fenigstein was conferansier. In late 1927 the troupe toured Lodz, Bialystok, Grodno, Kalish, Radom and Keltz.

In late 1928 Nozhik's group merged temporarily with the Yosef Strugatsh Azazel troupe to form Azazel-Sambatiyon, with Shloyme Prizament as music director and Willy Godick as conferencier.

In 1929 the Sambatiyon troupe began playing in Warsaw again, at the Scala theater. At the end of the year, the revi-teater was liquidated.

The theater produced sketches, one-act plays, songs and scenes by Hayim Nahman Bialik, Isaac Leib Peretz, Shimen Shmuel Frug, David Frischmann (Frishman), Avrom Reyzen, I. M. Vaysenberg, Moishe Broderzon, Zusman Segalovitsh, Moyshe Kulbak, Y. M. Nayman (A. Foygl), Der Tunkeler (Yosef Tunkel), Bontshe (Avrom Rozenfeld), Menakhem Kipnis, Moyshe Nudelman, Peysakh Hakhshtein, Der Lustiker Pesimist (I. Sh. Goldshtein), Isaac Nozhik, I. Mitsmakher, Yankev Oberzhanek, Sh. L. Shneyderman and Igor S. Korntayer.

Actors included Herman Fenigstein, Yitskhok Nozhik, Dovid Lederman, Władysław Godik, A. Rotman, Dovid Lederman. Chaim Sandler, Yitskhok Feld, Adolf Berman, S. bronetsky, A. Eisenberg, A. Shtokfeder, Shlomo Prizament, H. Feynshtein, M. Hermalin, H. Fisher, B. Shvartzshtein, M. Levin, M. Fishman, Hannah Grosberg, Gizi Heyden, Eva Shokfeder, Barsk-fisher, L. Shpilman, Maniela, R. Gazel, Manye and Celia (Tsili) Rappel, M. Potashinsky, Ola Lilith, Zutsanovitsh, Gina Gold, M. Gurvitsh.
