= Igor S. Korntayer =

Polish Jewish actor and writer

Igor S. Korntayer (Yiddish: ס. קאָרנטײער, born 1890s, murdered in Auschwitz c. 1942) was a Polish Jewish actor, lyricist, poet, and coupletist. He is best known for the Yiddish Tango song Vu ahin zol ikh geyn? (Where Shall I Go?), for which he is usually credited for writing new Yiddish lyrics.

== Biography ==
Little is known about his birthplace or early life. According to Zalmen Zylbercweig, the earliest records of him date from when he arrived in the Łódź Yiddish theater in 1918, with a translation of Lermontov's Spanish Blood (called Jewish Blood). Soon afterwards, at Julius Adler's request he translated Shakespeare's Othello. He knew several languages and had a knack for dramaturgy.

He then moved to Warsaw, where he was hired in 1926 by the Scala Theater to write song lyrics, for instance to Osip Dimov's Yoshke Muzikant. In 1927 he wrote lyrics for the operetta Velvele Shmudnik (music by Sh. Vayntroyb and David Beigelman).

He wrote many songs for the theaters Scala and Sambatiyon.

In 1935 he acted with Alexander Granach in Alter Kacyzne's Velt-gevisn in Łódź. He wrote a play called Nokh Halbe Nakht (After midnight) which debuted June 4, 1942 (directed by Chaim Sandler). He is best known for writing new Yiddish lyrics for the song Vu ahin zol ikh geyn? (Where Shall I Go?) written with "tango-king" Oskar Strock; their version was based on an existing Russian language tango, "Blue eyes" (Russian: Голубые глаза) which was then popular in Poland in a Polish-language version called "Dokąd mam iść?". Two other notable songs are Kum tsu mir (Come to me), a tango, and Mayn libeslid (My Love Song), both to music by Pawel Brajtman, premiered in Yiddish theaters in Vienna and Bucharest. On a lighter note, he wrote Yiddish lyrics (performed by Menashe Oppenheim) to the song Sex Appeal made famous by Eugeniusz Bodo in the 1937 movie Piętro wyżej (Upstairs).

Following the Nazi invasion of Poland in 1939, he was forced to live in the Warsaw Ghetto. He continued to compose music and plays there. He wrote the comedy Cype fun Nowolipe (Cipe fun Nowolipie) which played in June 1941 at the Eldorado Theater, and a revue called Wesele zydowskie (Jewish wedding) at the Melody Palace.

He was murdered in the gas chambers at Auschwitz concentration camp.
