= Itzik Manger =

Yiddish poet (1901–1969)

- איציק מאַנגער
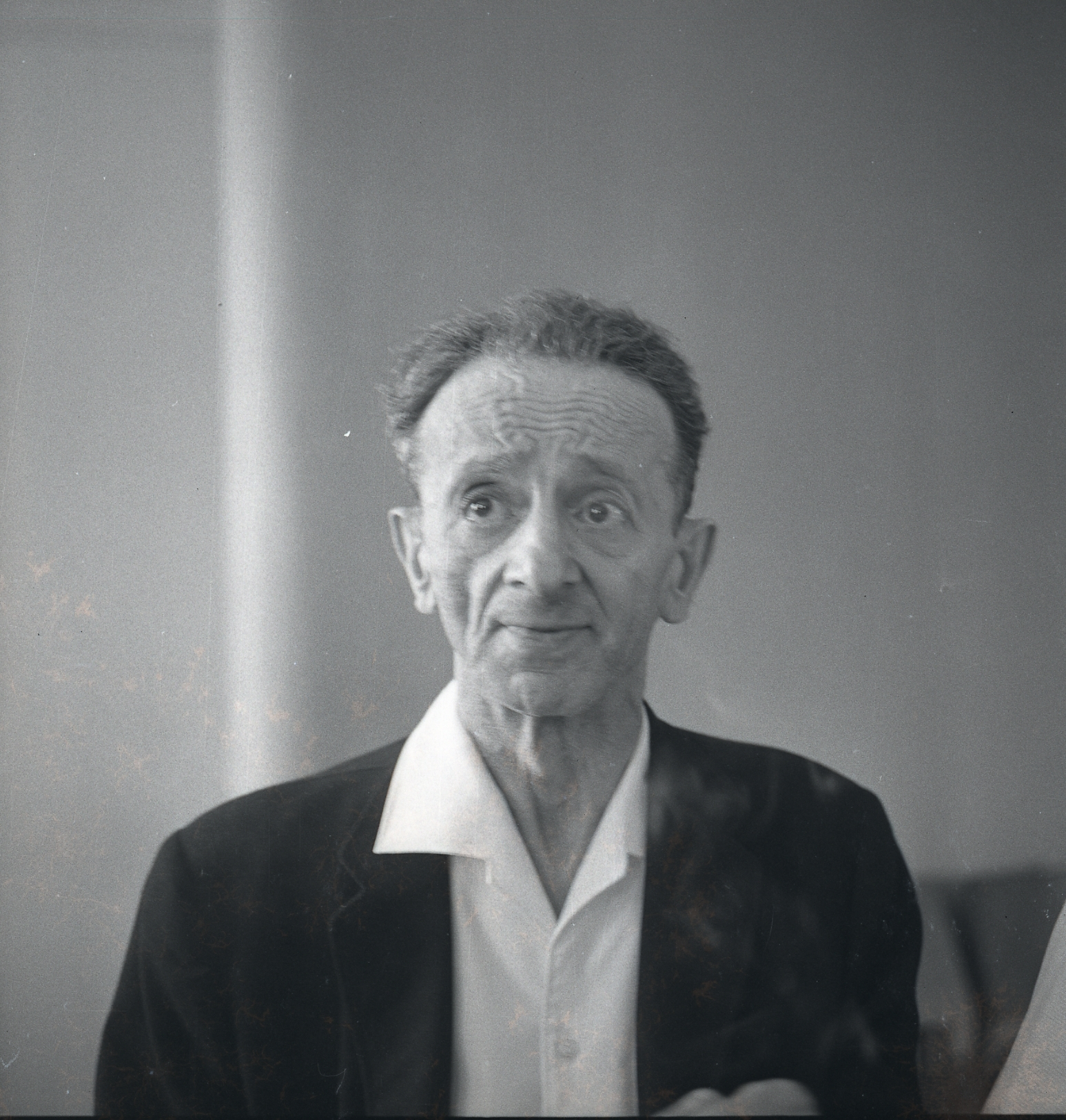
- Itzik Manger, 1965, taken by Boris Carmi in Israel
- Born: 30 May 1901; Czernowitz, Bukovina, Austria-Hungary
- Died: 21 February 1969 (aged 67); Gedera, Israel
- Burial place: Nahalat Yitzhak Cemetery, Tel Aviv, Israel
- Occupations: Poet; writer; playwright
- Spouse: Ghenya Nadir
- Partner: Rokhl Auerbakh

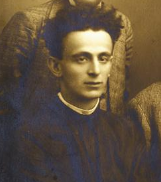
Itzik Manger

Itzik Manger (Yiddish: איציק מאַנגער, 30 May 1901 – 21 February 1969) was a prominent Yiddish poet and playwright, a self-proclaimed folk bard, visionary, and 'master tailor' of the written word.

== Early life ==
Manger was born to a Jewish family in Czernowitz, Austria-Hungary (now Chernivtsi, Ukraine) in 1901. Manger was fond of creating fictional biographies for himself and passing them off as truth. In his most famous fake biography, submitted to the editors of the Leksikon fun yidishn teater, he claimed that he was born in Berlin in 1900 and did not learn Yiddish until the age of fourteen. His father, Hillel Helfer-Manger, was a skilled tailor in love with literature, which he referred to as 'literatoyreh' (a portmanteau of the Yiddish words literatura and Toyreh). As a teenager, Manger attended the Kaiserlich-Königliches III. Staatsgymnasium in Czernowitz, where he studied German literature until he was expelled for pranks and bad behaviour. He exchanged this traditional education for the backstage atmosphere of the Yiddish theatre.

== Young poet ==
Manger began publishing his early poems and ballads in 1921 in several new literary journals founded in the aftermath of World War I. Soon afterwards, he settled in Bucharest and wrote for the local Yiddish newspapers while giving occasional lectures on Spanish, Romanian, and Romani folklore.

He moved to Warsaw in 1927, the spiritual and intellectual center of Ashkenazi Jewry and "the most inspiring city in Poland." He lived in the capital of the Yiddish cultural world for the next decade, which became the most productive years of his entire career. Manger published his first book of poetry in 1929, Shtern afn dakh (Stars on the Roof), in Warsaw to critical acclaim. He was so well known by the following year that he was admitted to the Yiddish P.E.N. club, along with Isaac Bashevis Singer, Israel Rabon, and Joseph Papiernikov. It was around this time that he changed his name from the formal sounding Yitzkhok to the child's diminutive Itzik, thus actualizing his self-transformation from poet to folk bard.

== Literary success ==
Under the ruins of Poland

a golden head lies
both the head and the destruction

are very true.

— Itzik Manger, Under the Ruins of Poland

Manger took the Warsaw literary world by storm between 1929 and 1938. He gave frequent readings of his poetry at the Writers' Club, was interviewed by all the major Warsaw Yiddish papers, published articles in the prestigious journal Literarishe Bleter (Literary Pages), issued his own literary journal called Chosen Words, filled with his poetry, fiction, and artistic manifestos. At the same time, he continued to publish his own works, including a series of modernist poems inspired by the Oral Torah (Itzik's Midrash, 1935), a dramatic rewriting of the Purim story from the Book of Esther (Songs of the Megillah, 1936), a loose adaptation of Abraham Goldfaden's The Witch of Botoşani (Hotzmakh's Shpiel, 1937), a series of vignettes on the history of Yiddish literature (Familiar Portraits, 1938), and three more volumes of poetry (Lantern in the Wind, 1933; Velvl Zbarzher Writes Letters to Malkele the Beautiful, 1937; and Twilight in the Mirror, 1937).

=== Working with Biblical themes ===
Manger's Itzik's Midrash and Songs of the Megillah deserve special mention, as they represent his first attempts to re-write familiar old material through a modernist lens. In Itzik's Midrash, he presents a modern commentary on the classic Bible stories by anachronistically placing his characters in contemporary Eastern Europe. Manger's playful attitude towards the original text is self-evident; in the introduction he writes, "As I wrote this book, the rogue's cap of the Yiddish Purim play hovered always before my eyes." Inspired by the Purim spiel genre, which used a traditional story to mock the norms and expectations of Jewish religious life in previous centuries, Manger's Midrash radically revises traditional portrayals of Biblical characters by requiring them to justify their actions according to modern norms and values. Traditionally valued characters such as Abraham and Sarah are harshly critiqued, while under-represented characters like Hagar and Ishmael are given a voice.

In Songs of the Megillah, he uses a similar technique to politicise and de-sacralise the Biblical text read aloud on Purim. Once again, his introduction classifies the book as "a kind of mischief-making on the model of Purim players in every age." Like Itzik's Midrash, Songs of the Megillah is a modern, radical retelling of the story of Esther set in contemporary Eastern Europe. He even introduced a new character into the narrative: Fastrigosso, Esther's jilted lover, and a member of the Needles and Thread Tailors' Union, who conspires to assassinate King Ahashverosh to win back Esther's affections. Combined with his 1937 play Hotzmakh's Shpiel, these three revival texts secured Manger his international reputation as "the master recloaker of the oldest and the newest literary traditions."

== Leaving Poland ==
Manger never acquired Polish citizenship and was forced to leave the country in the light of legal difficulties, having been stripped of his Romanian citizenship, and becoming stateless. He left for Paris in 1938, an exile from his creative homeland, however, he was not safe for long, and fled in 1940 to Marseille, Tunis, Liverpool, and finally London, where he became a British citizen, and remained there unhappily for the next eleven years. He arrived in the United States in 1951, where he met his future wife, Ghenya Nadir, the widow of writer Moyshe Nadir. The two lived in the Sea Gate neighbourhood of Brooklyn. He visited Israel in 1958, and continued a series of short visits there every few years in 1961, 1963, and 1965. An ailing Manger returned to Israel in 1966, where he remained in a sanatorium in Gedera until his death in 1969.

== Legacy ==
Manger achieved significant success in Israeli literary and theatrical circles when Dov Seltzer directed a highly popular production of Manger's Songs of the Megillah in 1965. The musical was a great success, setting a new record in Israeli theatre with its more than 400 performances. Prominent members of Israeli society, including politicians Levi Eshkol, Golda Meir, and Teddy Kollek, made highly publicised appearances at the performances. After his death, he was mourned as an Israeli national poet.

Romanian Jewish playwright Israil Bercovici adapted a collection of Manger's poems into a two-act stage piece, Mangheriada, which premiered 6 April 1968 at the Romanian State Jewish Theater in Bucharest. His poem "Oyfn veg shteyt a boym" ("On the Road Stands a Tree") has been set to music and entered the repertoire of Yiddish song, for example as a 1951 hit by Leo Fuld. Hertz Grosbard recited many of his works in so called "word concerts".

=== Itzik Manger Prize ===
Shortly before his death, the Itzik Manger Prize for outstanding Yiddish writing was established. The inaugural prize was given to Manger himself (!) at a banquet on 31 October 1968. The banquet was attended by Golda Meir, then the prime minister of Israel, and by Zalman Shazar, then president of Israel. Subsequently, the prize was awarded annually until about 2000.

== Works ==
- Manger, Itzik (2016). Gal-Ed, Efrat (ed.). Dunkelgold [Dark Gold] (in German). Jüdischer Verlag. ISBN 978-3633541980.

== Bibliography ==
- Manger, Itzik. The World According to Itzik: Selected Poetry and Prose.
- Roskies, David; Wolf, Leonard (2002). "Introduction to Itzik Manger". The World According to Itzik: Selected Poetry and Prose. New Haven, CT: Yale University Press.
