= Godik =

Godik or Godick is a surname. Notable people with the surname include:

- Eduard Godik (born 1935), Russian Jewish American physicist and inventor
- Giora Godik (1921–1977) was a Polish-born Jewish Israeli theater producer and impresario
- Władysław Godik (1891–1952) was a Polish Jewish singer, actor and director
