= Velvel Zbarjer =

Galician Jewish Brody singer

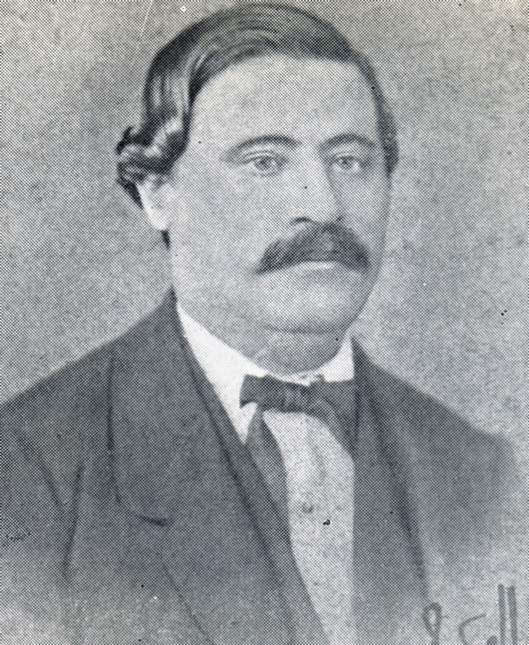
Velvel Zbarjer

Velvel Zbarjer (1824, Zbarazh – 1884), birth name Benjamin Wolf Ehrenkrantz (a.k.a. Velvl Zbarjer, Zbarjur, Zbarzher, etc.), a Galician Jew, was a Brody singer. Following in the footsteps of Berl Broder, his "mini-melodramas in song" were precursors of Yiddish theater.

Born in Zbarazh, Galicia, he moved to Romania in 1845. According to Sol Liptzin, this move was occasioned by the offense his townspeople took at his "heresies and scoffing verses". He worked briefly as a schoolteacher in Botoşani, but soon became an itinerant singer, singing in the homes of wealthy Jews and in workers' cafes in Botoşani, Iaşi, Galaţi, and Piatra Neamț, always glad to sing for a glass of wine or a meal. An actor as much as a singer, he variously sang the praises of his own footloose life and made up topical songs about whatever might be going on in the towns he passed through; the latter often described injustices, or made fun of the Hasidic Jews, and occasionally got him tossed out of various towns.

In 1865, having noticed that others were singing his songs without giving him credit, he published them in a Hebrew-Yiddish booklet. As he grew older, he settled down. He lived in Vienna from 1878 to 1889, then lived out his last years in Istanbul, where he married for a second time, to a woman known as Malkele the Beautiful. This end-of-life romance became the subject, in 1937, of a cycle of twelve verse epistles by Itzik Manger.

Writing in the Jewish Encyclopedia (1901–1906), Isidore Singer and Peter Wiernik describe him as "a real folk-poet" whose songs, two decades after his death were "still sung by the Jewish masses of Galicia and southern Russia."

== Published works ==
His first published poem, written in Hebrew and based on a Talmudical parable, appeared in "Kokebe Yizhak," xii. 102-103, Vienna, 1848. His next work, "Hazon la-Mo'ed," a satire on the Hasidim and their rabbis, is also in Hebrew (Iaşi, 1855). His Yiddish songs were published with a Hebrew translation in four parts, under the collective name "Makkel No'am" (Vienna, 1865, and Lemberg—now Lviv—1869–78). A new edition in Roman characters appeared in Brăila, Romania, 1902 (see Ha-Meliẓ, v. 42, No. 125). His "Makkel Hobelim" (1869) and "Sifte Yeshenah" (1874) appeared in Przemyśl. Gustaf Hermann Dalman's "Jüdisch-Deutsche Volkslieder aus Galizien und Russland," pp. 29-42, 2d ed., Berlin, 1891 reproduces some of Velvel Zbarjer's songs.

== Modern reception ==
He is the subject of Canadian writer Jill Culiner's travelogue A Contrary Journey (Claret Press, 2021).
