= Eliakum Zunser =

Lithuanian Yiddish writer (1840–1913)

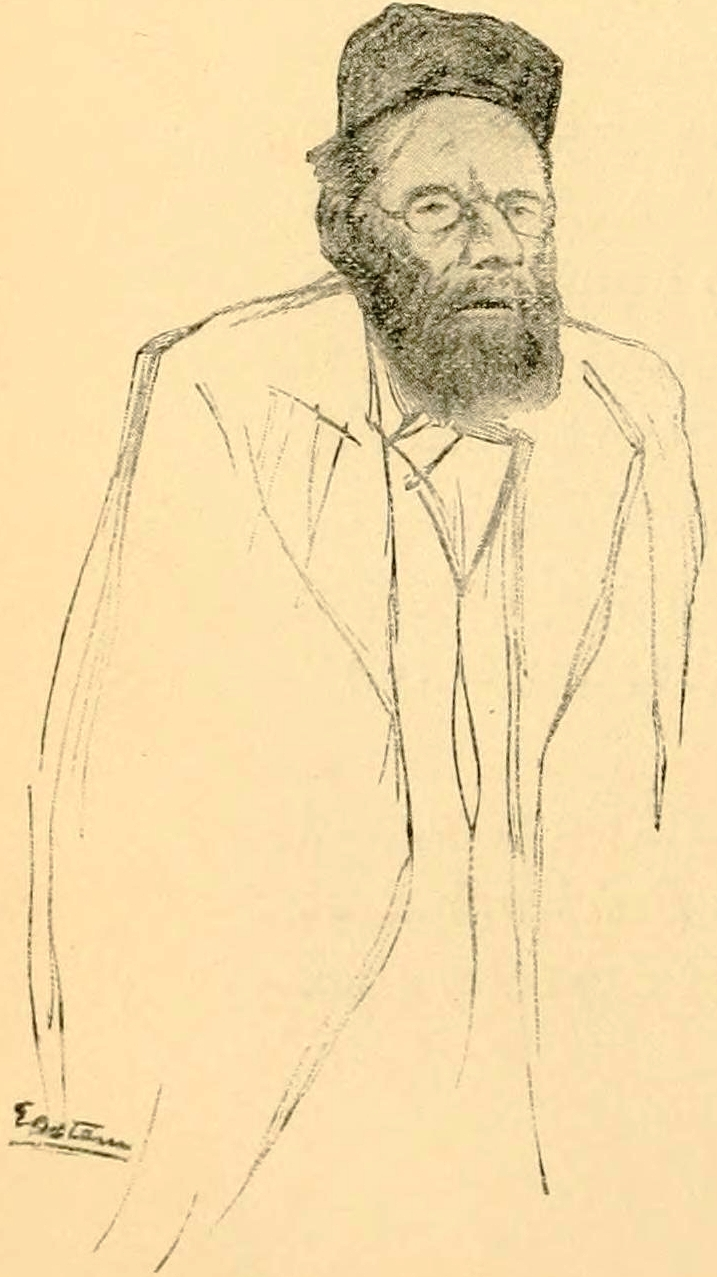
Eliakum Zunser

Eliakum Zunser (Eliakim Badchen, Elikum Tsunzer) (October 28, 1840 – September 22, 1913) was a Lithuanian Jewish Yiddish-language poet, songwriter, and badchen who lived out the last part of his life in the U.S. A 1905 article in The New York Times lauded him as "the father of Yiddish poetry". About a quarter of his roughly 600 songs survive. He influenced and was influenced by Brody singer Velvel Zbarzher, although it is not believed that they ever met.

Born in Vilna, he grew up poor and first worked braiding lace in Kovno, where he was associated with the devout, moralistic Musar movement of Rabbi Israel Salanter. Later, he was drawn to the Haskalah, or Jewish Enlightenment, and adopted a more modern Orthodox Judaism that renounced superstition.

Forcibly conscripted into the Russian Army just before his twentieth birthday, he was soon released due to Czar Alexander II's revocation of the harsh conscription law. The plight of Jewish draftees, or "cantonists" would be a major subject of his early poetry and songs.

Sol Liptzin describes Zunser's songs as having "simple words and catchy tunes", singing of the "melancholy fate and few joys of the inarticulate masses" and writes that "his songs spread by word of mouth... until all Yiddish-speaking Jews were familiar with them". [Liptzin, 1972, 48]

In 1861 he published a booklet of songs entitled Shirim Khadoshim, the first of about 50 publications in his lifetime. At this time, he was, in Liptzin's words, "primarily a Maskil"—a propagator of the Haskalah—"interested in instructing and aiding his people". However, his life took a tragic turn: not only did his wife die of cholera in the next decade, but all of their nine children as well, and he became, again quoting Liptzin, "a prophet of doom, admonishing his co-religionists not to venture too date along the alluring road of western enlightenment and assimilation..." [Liptzin, 1972, 49] When that doom came, in the form of the antisemitic reaction and pogrom after the assassination of Alexander II, he became again a comforter, as well as a Zionist, affiliated with the Hovevei Zion and Bilu pioneers, writing songs such as "Die Sokhe" ("The Plough") and "Shivath Zion" ("Homecoming to Zion").

Zunser emigrated to New York City in 1889, and worked as a printer. However, life in New York was not conducive to his muse, and he wrote little in the years after his arrival in America, mostly poems rather than songs. En route to the New World, he wrote the hopeful "Columbus and Washington"; once there, he followed this with the far more disillusioned "Dos Goldene Land" ("The Golden Land") and "Der Greener" ("The Greenhorn"). His Zionism continued in a song urging the Jewish people to give up peddling and become farmers.

Zunser was saved from penury in his final years by a benefit performance on his behalf held at Cooper Union on March 30, 1905, which raised enough money to give him a pension. He died on September 22, 1913, and was buried in Washington Cemetery in Brooklyn.

He was far from a singer. His voice was not musical. But the sad tone one heard within it, the beautiful Yiddish, the soulful melodies – these were matchless.

— "Ale Verk", Band I, p. 18

== Works ==
- The Works of Elyokum Zunser: A Critical Edition, in two volumes, edited by Mordkhe Schaechter, YIVO, 1964.
