= Berl Broder =

Berl Broder (1817–1868), born Berl Margulis, was a Ukrainian Jew born in Podkamen, the most famous of the Broder singers (19th century Jewish singers comparable to the troubadours or Minnesänger) and reputed the first to be both a singer and an actor. His nickname is the origin of the term Broder singer. Thirty of his songs survive; of these, 24 are in the form of dialogues, usually between craftsmen such as tailors or shoemakers; his songs are seen as a precursor to Yiddish theater.

His childhood was taken up with religious studies at home, until his father's death when he was 16. A handsome, bright young man with a good voice, he taught himself the violin. He worked briefly as a brushmaker; his co-workers became his first audience, calling him "Berl der vertlzoger" - a man who always had a rhyme or a proverb. It was after he married, at the age of 25, that his predilection towards writing and singing emerged.

From some time in his late teens or early twenties, he headed on the road as an itinerant performer, along with two other singers, one of whom was also a tailor who made costumes for the troupe. It is believed that many of his songs were improvised on the spot; only thirty survive in written form. In 1857, when economic crisis hit Brody, he created the Broder-singer troupe and left for Russia. His first book of poetry was published in 1860 in Pressburg, the second in Lemberg, and the third (1882) in Warsaw. He composed a tremendous number of songs and couplets which were never published, and would challenge his partners and competitors to rhyming duels, himself generally emerging the victor.

After leaving Brody, he never settled in any one place; he was also known as a heavy drinker. He lived his last years in poverty. Zalmen Zylbercweig cites conflicting accounts of his last years: his son claimed he died in 1868 in Carlsbad, while a contemporary claimed he died in 1888 in Pliyeshtsh (Ploieşti, Romania), a small town near Bucharest.
