= Jill Culiner =

Canadian photographer (born 1945)

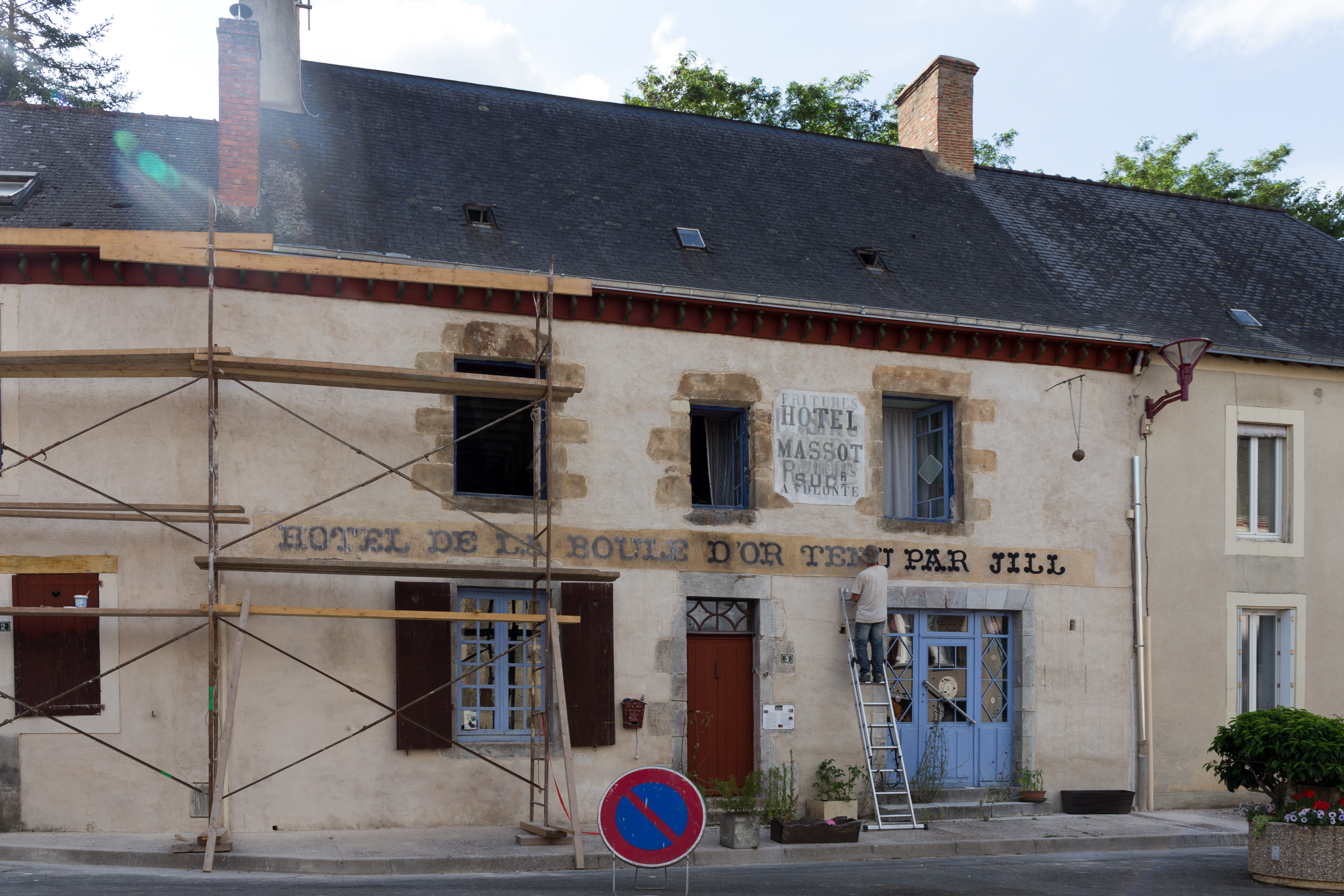
Hôtel de la Boule d'Or in Saint-Jean-sur-Erve, home of Jill Culiner since 1996.

Jill Culiner (born September 13, 1945) is a Canadian folk artist, photographer and writer.

== Personal life ==
Jill Culiner was born in New York City in 1945, and as an infant, she moved with her parents moved to Toronto. She is a Canadian citizen. She lives in France.

== Work ==
She has had one-person shows of her photography and "boxes" (an art form she pioneered that depicts various social issues in 3-D) in France, Germany, Spain, Italy, Poland, Canada and Hungary.

Her exhibition (with texts) entitled "La Mémoire Effacée" (The Vanished Memory, Az Elenyészett Emlék) concerning the First and Second World Wars, and the vanished Jewish communities of Europe, toured France, Canada and Hungary from 1996 to 2004 and was showcased in Budapest at the city's Holocaust Museum.

Culiner's first book was a photography book, Sans s'abolir pourtant (L'Echoppe, Paris, France 1992). She has also written novels. The first was Felicity's Power (Power of Love, Australia 2001), and her second novel, Slanderous Tongue (Sumach Press, 2007), is a social critical murder-mystery set in a village in France. Culiner's third novel, A Sad Summer in Biarritz (Club Lighthouse Pub, 2017), is also set in France.

Culiner also wrote a non-fiction literary travel book, Finding Home: In the footsteps of the Jewish Fusgeyers (Sumach Press, 2004), which won the Joseph and Faye Tanenbaum Prize in Canadian Jewish History (Canadian Jewish Book Awards 2005), and was shortlisted for ForeWord Magazine Prize's 2004 Book of the Year Awards Essay and History category, 2004.

Culiner speaks to groups across Canada, the United States, France and Israel about various aspects of European Jewish history.

Most recently, she has written a travelogue, A Contrary Journey (Claret Press, 2021), which follows her exploration into the life of Velvel Zbarjer and the Jewish Renaissance of the 19th Century.
