= Władysław Godik =

Polish actor and singer (1892–1952)

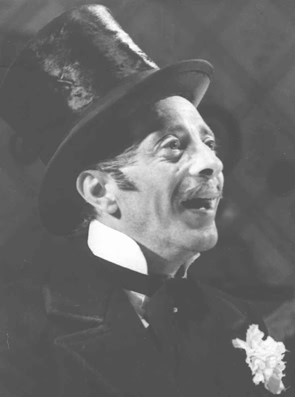
- Born: Władysław Godik; April 1, 1892; Zlatopil, Kiev Governorate, Russian Empire
- Died: December 18, 1952 (aged 68); Warsaw, Polish People's Republic
- Resting place: Powązki Military Cemetery
- Occupations: Actor, cabaret performer
- Years active: 1928-1956
- Spouse: Ola Lilith (divorced)
- Children: Giora Godik

Władysław Godik (Note: Also known as Willy Godik, Godick, Godnick and Vladislav Godik) (1 April 1892 – 18 December 1952) was a Polish Jewish singer, actor and director in Polish, Russian, and Yiddish theatre.

== Biography ==
Born in Zlatopil, he moved with his family to Warsaw, where he did two semesters in the veterinarian institute in 1911. Due to political reasons, however, he had to leave for Russia in the same year, where he began to earn money by performing in the circus in Kharkov. Then he played in an operetta in Kiev.

He acted in the dramatic section of Hazemir and in 1911 he began acting professionally at Gershanovitsh in Vitebsk, playing Baynushl in Pintele Yid. During the First World War he took part in Krutshinin's Russian operettas and later some German operettas. In 1909 he appeared in Radom in Tsharnetski's Polish Operetta troupe, and played in Shulamis, then founded a Polish-language revue theater called Mirage. Half a year later he joined Zygmunt Turkow and Ester Rachel Kamińska's traveling troupe. He played for four years at the Central Theater and spent one year in Vilna with Morevski.

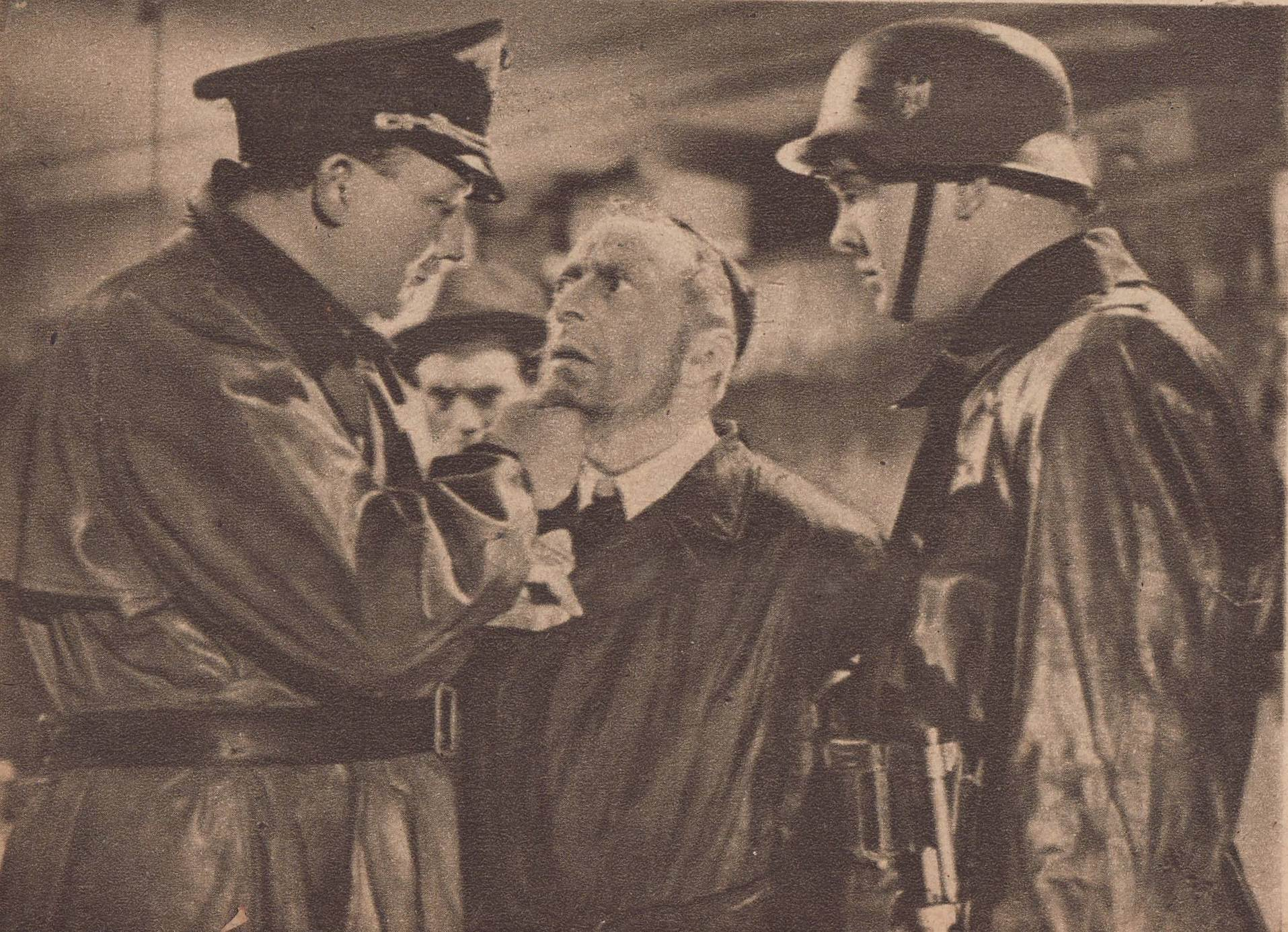
Władysław Godik as tailor Liberman in Polish Movie Ulica Graniczna, 1947

In 1915–18, he performed in the revue theater in Vienna, gaining fame as a compere. In 1918 he returned to Poland. From 1920–28, he performed, among others, with at the Azazel Theatre. During this period, he is believed to have been married to Ola Lilith. Between 1920 and 1928 he appeared at the Habima Theatre. He became renowned as a conferencier (Master of Ceremonies). In 1918 he returned to Poland and in 1925 he convinced his wife to join him in founding the Yiddish Kleynkunst Theater Azazel. He was conferencier of the combined Azazel-Sambatiyon theater revue in 1928 and performed with the Warsaw Yiddish Art Theater (Varshever Yidisher Kunst-teater; VYKT). In 1931, he and Lilith debuted in America, in recitals and in The Girl from Warsaw. He returned with Lilith to Poland; she returned to America in 1935. In 1939 he fled the Nazis by entering the Soviet Union through Białystok.

In 1942, Godik joined the Red Army and was wounded in battle. After recovering he performed in Moscow and after 1944 in the Polish Army Theatre in Lodz. From 1946 until his death he acted at the Polish Theatre in Warsaw, where he died in 1952. His best-known film role is the tailor Liberman in Border Street directed by Aleksander Ford in 1948. By order of President of Poland, Bolesław Bierut issued on September 10, 1952, he was awarded the Officer's Cross of the Order of Polonia Restituta for his merits in the field of culture and art.

== Death ==
Godik died on December 18, 1952, aged 60, and was buried in the Avenue of the Meritorious at the Powązki Military Cemetery in Warsaw. He was survived by his son, Giora Godik.

== Filmography ==
- Tkies khaf (1924)
- Border Street (1948)
