= Ola Lilith =

Polish-American cabaret performer (1906–1980)

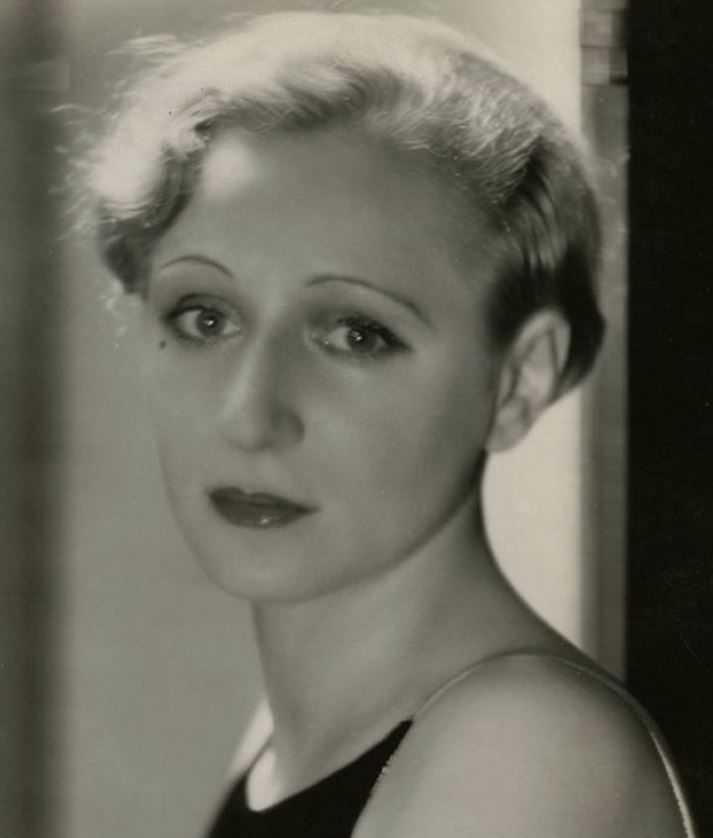
- Born: Łaja Cederbaum (or Lolya Tsederboym); 15 November 1906; Warsaw, Poland
- Died: 1 or 6 December 1980 (aged 74); Hialeah, Florida, U.S.
- Other name: Łaja Cederbaum
- Spouse(s): Władysław Godik (dates unknown); Leland M. Benton (1944–1970)

Ola Lilith (Yiddish: אָלאַ ליליט, born Łaja Cederbaum or לאָלאַ צעדערבױם Lolya Tsederboym; 15 November 1906 – 1 or 6 December 1980) was a Polish-American singer and actress in the Yiddish Theatre.

== Life ==
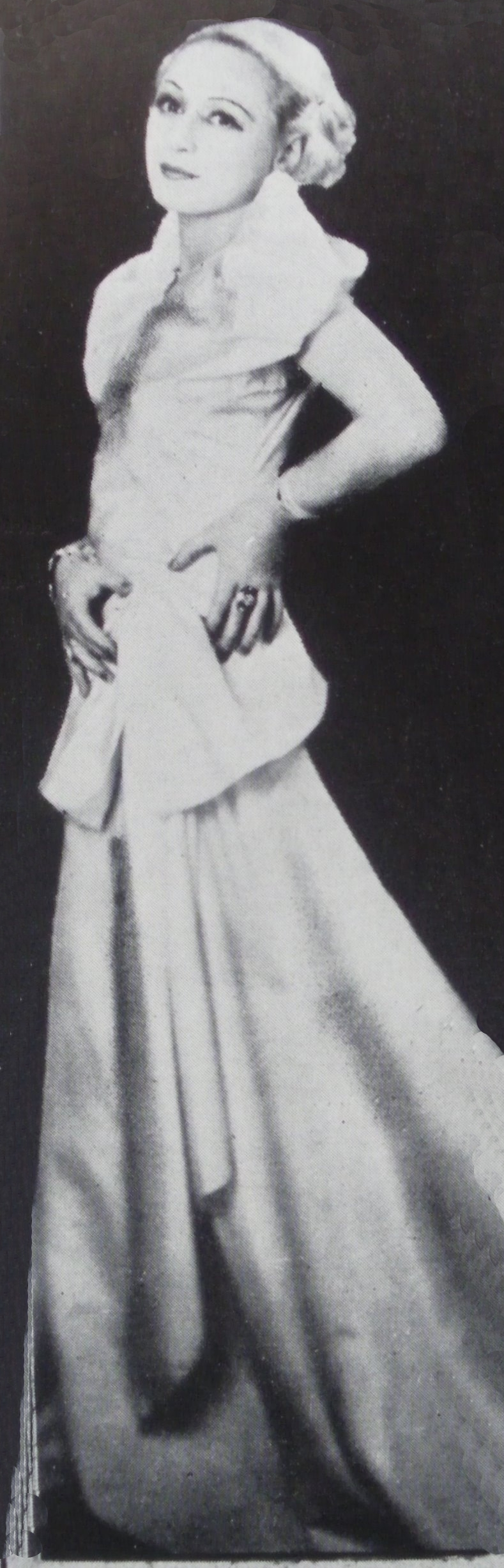
Ola Lilith in Fishl der gerotener

=== Early life ===
Ola was born in Warsaw in 1906 as Łaja Cederbaum to an assimilated Jewish family. Her parents were landlord Szyja Cederbaum (related to Aleksander Zederbaum) and Chawa Cederbaum. Young Łaja (or Lolya) Cederbaum attended 8-year Female Humanities High School of Fanny Posnerowa in Warsaw, and she belonged to a theatre club, where she sang songs to her own accompaniment. She also belonged to the sports club "Makabi Warsaw". She was a student of Aleksander Zelwerowicz. (In the United States 1940 census she claimed to have finished one year of higher education.)

=== Career ===
By the 1920s, her singing (in Warsaw) attracted the attention of Qui Pro Quo cabaret director Jerzy Boczkowski. She debuted there (under polonized name Cederowska) in 1922 or 1925, and performed there for a season with Karol Hanusz and Włodzimierz Macherski.

Her partner, Władysław Godik (whom she married at unknown point in time), convinced her to sing in Yiddish and to join him in founding the famous Warsaw Yiddish nightclub (kleynkunstbine) Azazel in 1925, where she first used the pseudonym Ola Lilith and became the biggest star of the troupe. After the Azazel troupe fell apart in March 192, Godik, Lilith and some Azazel members toured throughout Poland and all of Europe, and later with Boris Thomashefsky and Ruth Rene in Czechoslovakia, Austria, France, Berlin, Holland and England.

She was brought to America by Joseph Rumshinsky and Menasha Skulnik; she performed in New York City in 1931 and played the title role in Rumshinsky's Second Avenue production "A Maiden from Warsaw", with leading man Willy Godick, and subsequently the musical comedy Pleasure. Mordechai Yardeini called her the "Yiddish Edith Piaf."

Lilith gave concerts in Yiddish, and then in English, in Vaudeville RKO. She returned to Europe in the years just prior to World War II. It has mistakenly been reported that she died in a Nazi concentration camp. Instead, after her divorce she emigrated to the United States, becoming a U.S. citizen in 1935. She refused to join the Yiddish Theater Union, calling their audition process "The Inquisition". She sang and performed on WEVD radio programs in New York. Her last acting role was in Ven di zun geyt oyf (Sunrise, When the Sun Rises) with Ludwig Satz and Edmund Zayenda in 1941. She subsequently joined the American army and remarried a non-Jewish contractor named Leland Benton; they settled in Miami Springs, Florida. She died nearby in 1980, in Hialeah.
