= Badchen =

Jewish comedian who entertained guests at weddings

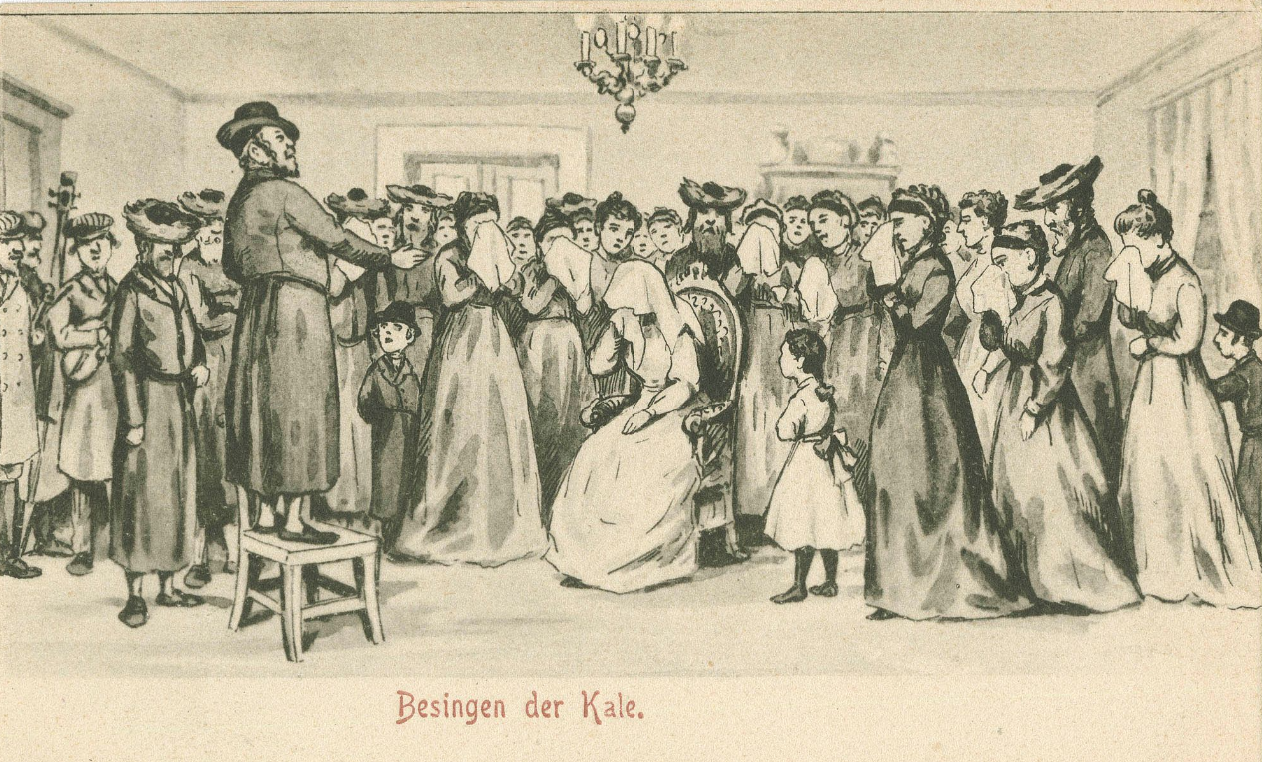
1902 postcard showing a badkhn addressing a bride at a Jewish wedding

A badchen or badkhn (Yiddish: בּדחן, pronounced and sometimes written batkhn) is a type of Ashkenazic Jewish professional wedding entertainer, poet, sacred clown, and master of ceremonies originating in Eastern Europe, with a history dating back to at least the sixteenth or seventeenth century. The badkhn was an indispensable part of the traditional Jewish wedding in Europe who guided the bride and groom through the stages of the ceremony, acted as master of ceremonies, and sang to the bride, groom and in-laws with the accompaniment of klezmer musicians. They also had a traditional role on holidays such as Hanukkah or Purim. Today they are primarily found in Hasidic communities.

== History ==
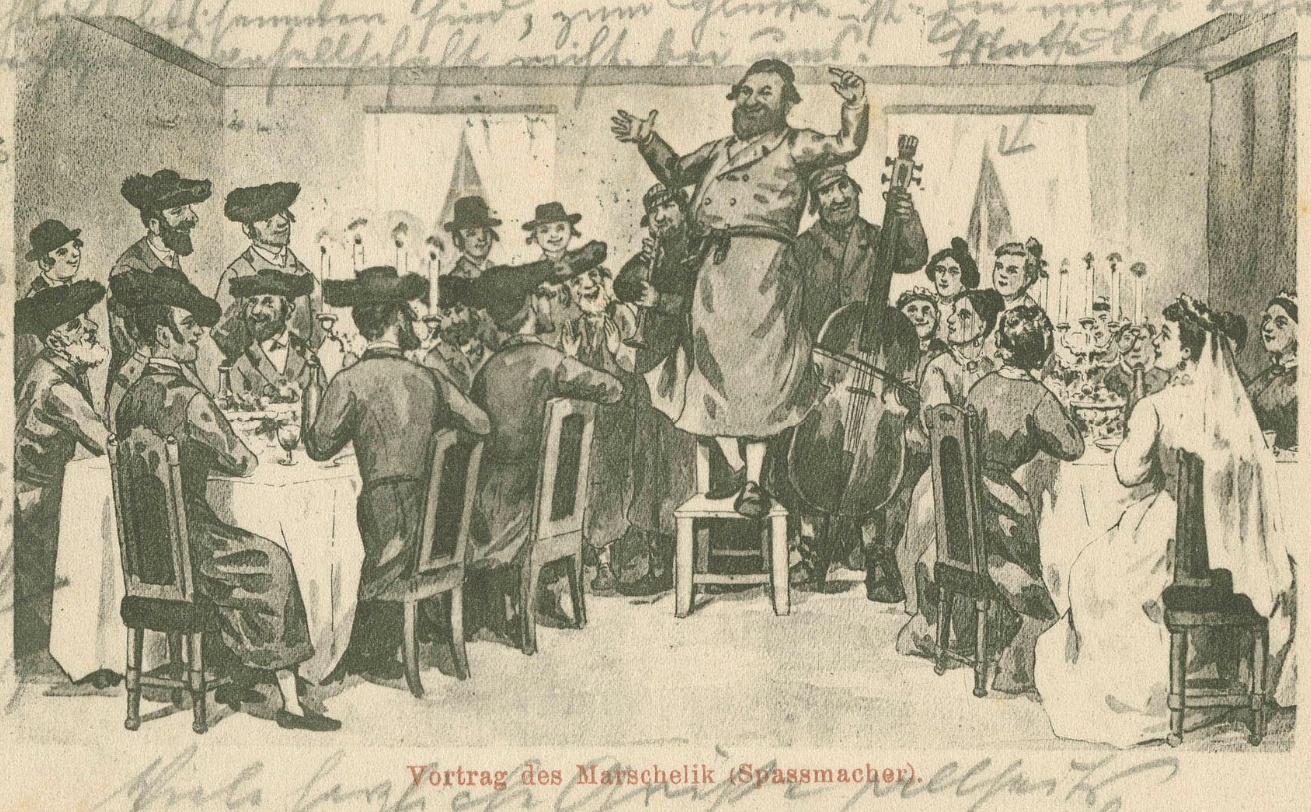
A 1903 postcard showing a badkhn addressing a wedding

There is a long history of entertainers at Jewish weddings dating back to the Talmudic era. The traditional role of the Eastern European badkhn evolved from older Medieval and Early Modern Jewish wedding entertainers, such as the lets (לץ) or marshelik (Yiddish: מאַרשעליק, romanized: marshélik, sometimes written marshalik), taking on a recognizable new form in seventeenth century Poland. (Some sources may use the terms badkhn, lets and marshelik interchangeably, whereas others treat them as distinct.) The earlier type of marshelik guided the ceremonies of the wedding in a more serious manner, but the badkhn turned the role into that a of a religiously informed, moralistic comedian. In this role they also drew on Yiddish Minstrels and Maggids who had been traveling entertainers in the fifteenth and sixteenth centuries. The tradition spread across Jewish Eastern Europe and seems to have reached its height of popularity during the nineteenth century.

With emigration from Europe, including to Ottoman Palestine, starting in the early nineteenth century and later to the United States, the practice spread to other parts of the world. With the rise of urbanization and the Haskalah, the role of the badkhn (and their partners, the klezmer musicians) declined in importance in Jewish life in the second half of the nineteenth century. Some modern cultural critics in the early Twentieth century even disdained their art form, such as Saul M. Ginsburg and Pesach Marek who called the badkhn a "mere mood manipulator at weddings" who "richly deserved the low status accorded to him in society". Judah Leib Cahan said that their arcane humor contributed to the "dry atmosphere" of petit-bourgeois Jewish life. On the other hand, some late nineteenth century badkhns were themselves influenced by the enlightenment and made its ideals a part of their performances.

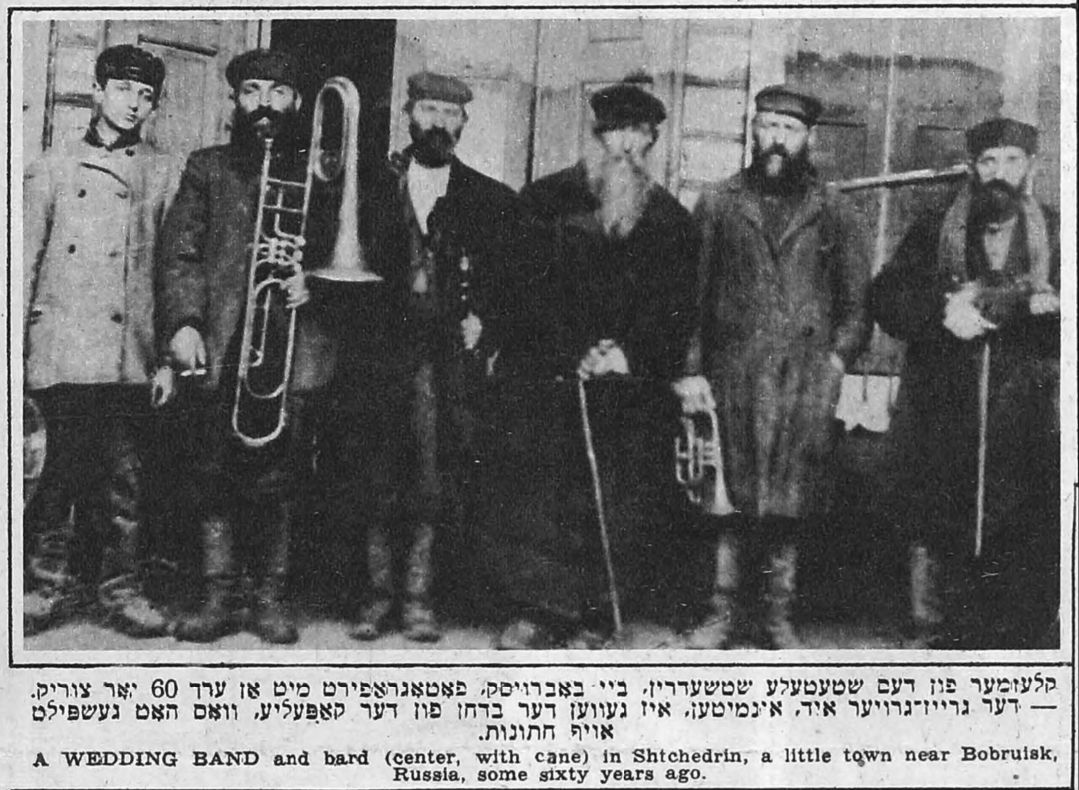
A klezmer band and badkhn in Shtchedrin, Russia, 1890s

The modern American badkhn tradition was largely reconstituted and developed in Hasidic communities after World War II. Rav Shlomo Yaakov Gelbman (1953–2015) was another modern badkhn and historian in the Satmar community. In this new context, the role of the badkhn is more limited than it traditionally was in Europe, and is often performed alongside a single keyboardist rather than a klezmer orchestra. The focus of their performances has also shifted from the bride towards the groom.

== Role ==
Traditionally, the badkhn was hired as a professional or semi-professional entertainer for Jewish weddings and other ritual occasions. He would not work alone, but would work with klezmer musicians, who themselves were a kind of professional Jewish entertainer. Some badkhns also worked as klezmer musicians in other contexts, and hereditary families of both professions often intermarried. Badkhns always had a fairly rigorous Jewish education in order to fulfill their role in the wedding; many were also Rabbis.

In the traditional wedding, the badkhn acted as a master of ceremonies, comedian, religious guide, and various other functions. He was expected to generate energy for a party before and after the ceremony, and also to bring guests along in the transition to a more serious tone immediately before the ceremony. He would speak and sing in Couplets, weaving in references to the Talmud and Tanach as well as making sarcastic commentary on contemporary life and doing impressions. He would also direct the ceremonies and organize the collection of money at various stages of the wedding. It was also possible for a particularly rich wedding to hire multiple badkhns.

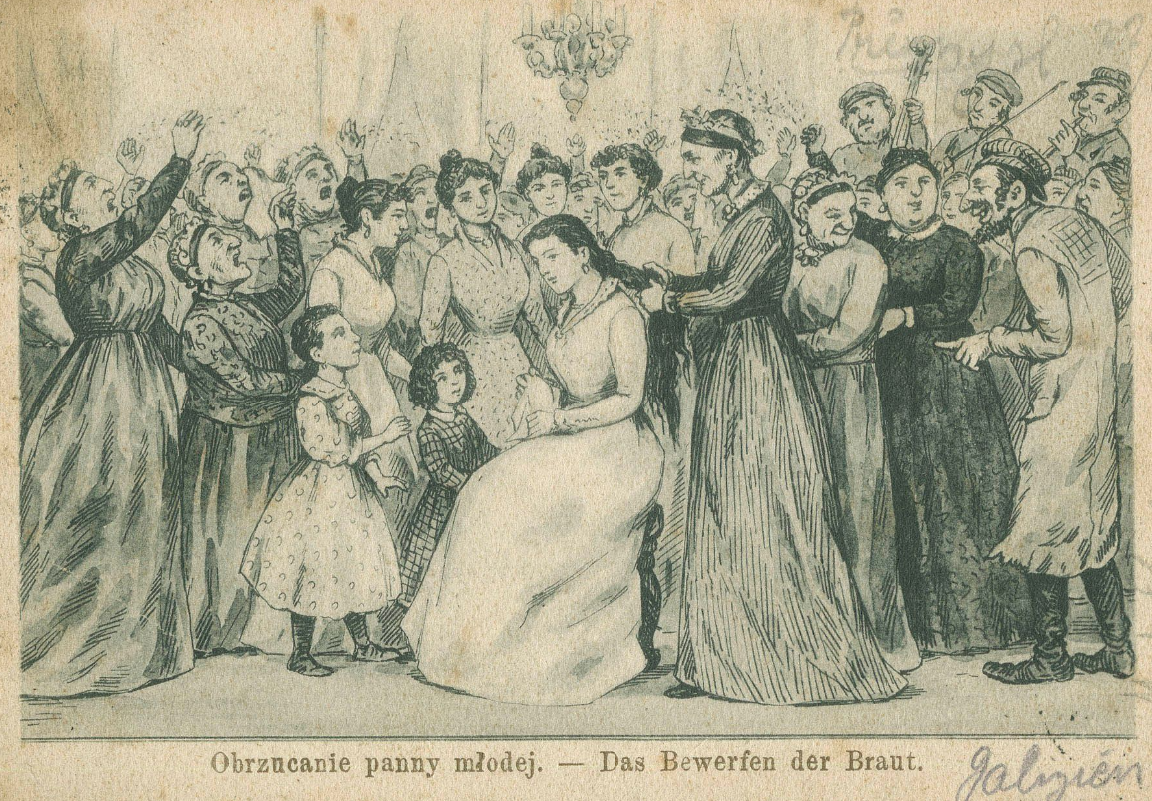
A 1902 postcard showing a scene from a Jewish wedding

The role of the badkhn was also to guide the bride and groom through the various ritual and customary stages of the traditional wedding. These often began with a procession of the wedding party through the streets to the home of the bride, with the accompaniment of the klezmer band and occasionally the badkhn. A further procession would take place later in the morning to the place where the wedding was to take place. The next stages often focused on the bride. In various places this phase would be called Bazetsn di kale (seating of the bride), kale bazingn (singing for the bride) kale badekns (bridal veiling), while the badkhn sang couplets punctuated by accompaniment by the klezmer musicians. Often these couplets would include descriptions of a wife's responsibilities combined with phrases such as "kalenyu, kalenyu, veyn, veyn, veyn" (oh dear little bride, weep, weep, weep).

After that, the klezmer band would escort the couple to the courtyard of the synagogue for the legal part of the ceremony. Another stages was the mazltov or mitzvah dance where the badkhn called up each woman present to embrace the bride, had men symbolically dance with the bride via a handkerchief, or other ritual forms to announce honored guests. The badkhn also sang more lighthearted couplets during the wedding feast.

Aside from weddings, badkhns have also traditionally had roles in other ceremonies or holidays, such as Hanukkah or Purim, and for Bris (circumcision). On Purim in particular, Badkhns were known to perform in short plays or performances.

== Contemporary badkhns ==
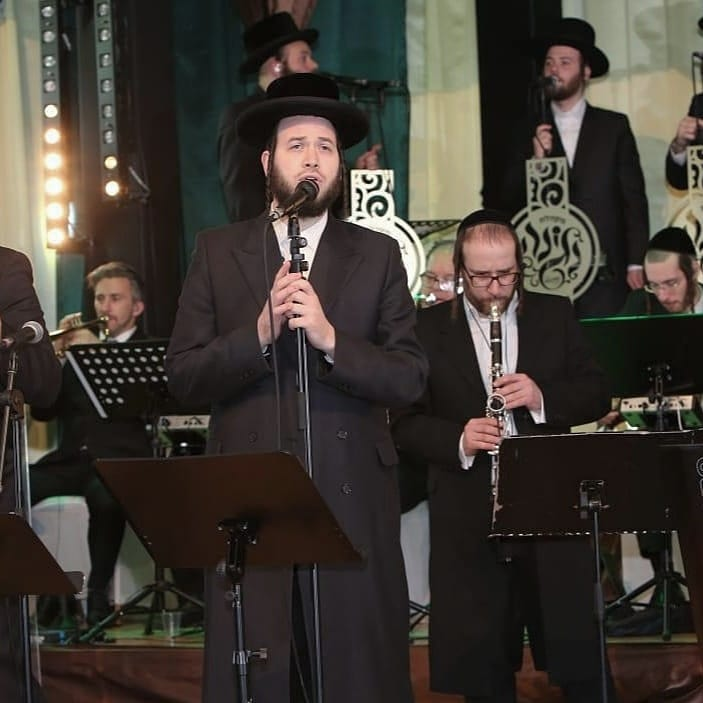
Motty Ilowitz performing with an orchestra in 2021

Today the tradition of badkhns exists mainly in Hasidic communities. Current performers include Motty Ilowitz, Yankel Miller and Yoel Lebowits.

== Popular culture ==
Various forms of modern Jewish entertainment which arose in the Nineteenth century were created by former badkhns, or drew on aspects of the tradition, including Yiddish song, Yiddish poetry, Yiddish Theatre, and Broderzingers. The so-called "father of Yiddish poetry", Eliakum Zunser, was a former badkhn, as were many of the early actors in Abraham Goldfaden's theatre troupes as well as coffeehouse singers who are now long forgotten. Satirical Yiddish songs of the late Nineteenth century also drew on the tradition of the badkhn, especially in their use and parody of liturgical music, and many pioneering Yiddish-language recording artists of the early Twentieth century were former badkhns, including Solomon Smulewitz and Frank Seiden. As well, an early genre of Yiddish-language recorded music involved parodies of the badkhn's traditional performances by Yiddish Theatre actors such as Gus Goldstein, Julius Guttman, Molly Picon, H. I. Reissmann, and the aforementioned Seiden and Smulewitz. Later the traditions of Jewish comedy and vaudeville in the Borscht Belt also drew on aspects of the badkhn's performances.

In the world of Jewish literature, badkhns often appeared as romantic or colourful figures, including in the works of literary figures such as Lev Levanda, Grigory Isaakovich Bogrov, Ezeldel Kotik, Avrom Ber Gotlober, Pauline Wengeroff and Abraham Cahan.

With the Klezmer revival in the late 1970s and early 1980s, there was some renewed interest in badkhn-style singing among klezmer bands. The revival band Kapelye included songs in that style on their albums Future And Past (1981) and Kapelye's Chicken (1987). The group Budowitz, in their attempt to recreate a Nineteenth century Jewish wedding sound, also included badkhn-style performances on their albums Mother Tongue (1997) and Wedding without a Bride (2000).
