= Zalmen Zylbercweig =

Historian of Yiddish theater

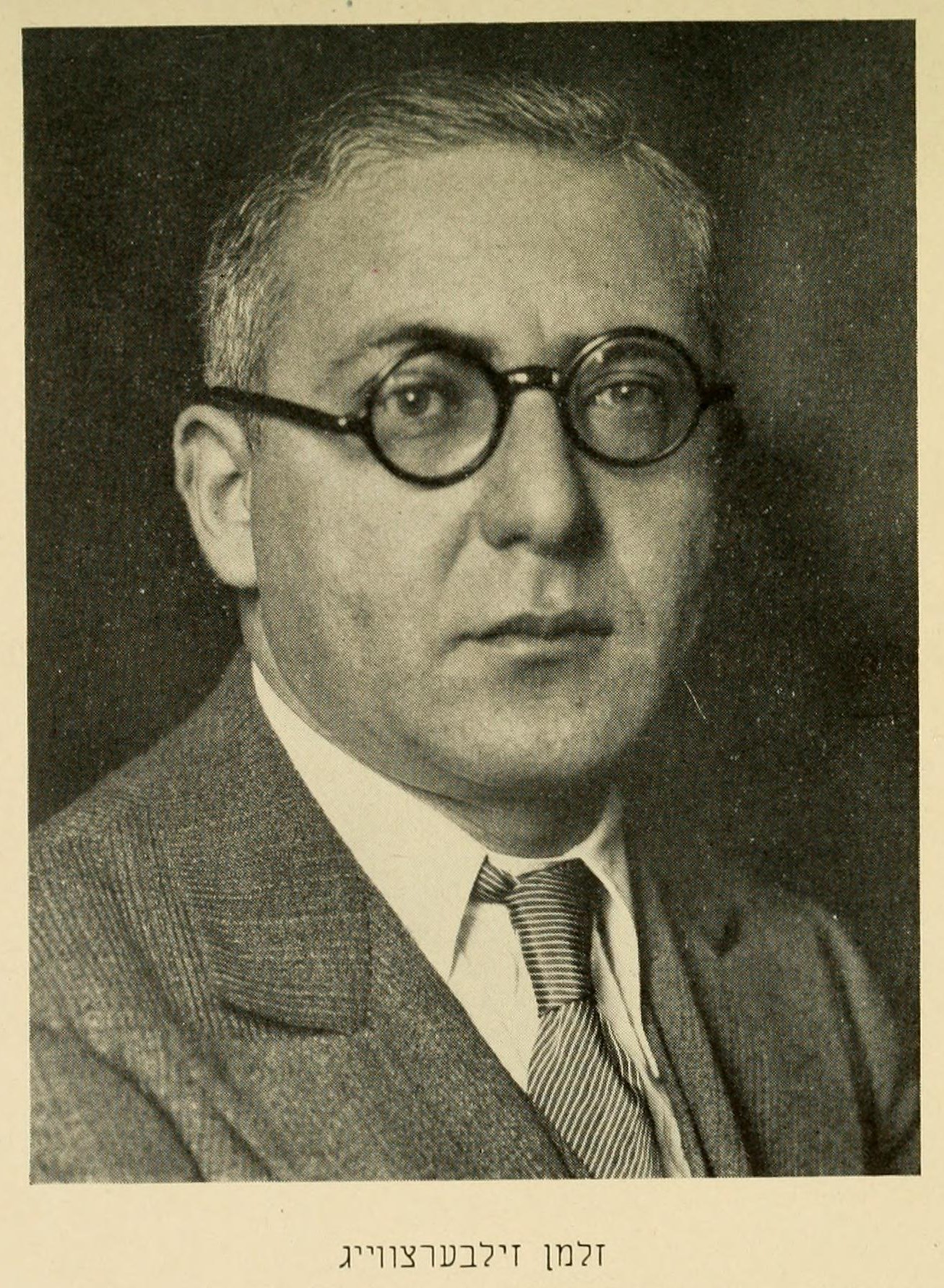
Zalmen Zylbercweig

Zalmen Zylbercweig (Yiddish: זלמן זילבערצװײַג; 1894–1972) was a Russian historian of Yiddish theater. He is best known as the author of the six-volume Leksikon fun yidishn teater (Lexicon or Encyclopedia of the Yiddish Theatre), the largest reference work on the history of Yiddish theatre.

Zylbercweig was born in Ozorków. He grew up in an intellectual family and was educated in traditional and modern subjects. From a young age he was attracted to the Yiddish theatre, and on leaving school attempted to become an actor. Although he soon realized he did not have the necessary talents, he still loved the theatre and tried a variety of supporting tasks: writing short plays, translating material from the European repertoire, directing, and managing troupes. All of these provided an unreliable income, and he turned instead to journalism.

After several years of writing and editing newspapers, Zylbercweig embarked on a project to document Yiddish theatre. In 1918 he began collecting material for a five-part documentary history. Eventually he reduced his scope to just a biographical dictionary, which would also include important theatre troupes and movements. After many delays, including that caused by Zylbercweig's relocation to New York, the first volume appeared in 1931. A second volume came out in 1934, and there were hopes to complete a final volume in the following years. However, the economic situation during the Depression limited publishing opportunities, and the arrival of World War II made other matters more pressing for Jewish communities. After the War, Zylbercweig picked up his work again. In 1959 the third volume appeared, followed by three more volumes in 1963, 1967, and 1969.

When Zylbercweig died in Los Angeles in 1972, a final seventh volume was in page proofs awaiting publication, but no funding was in place for the printing. Copies of these proofs are held at YIVO and Hebrew University.

The Leksikon remains the single most important reference work for study of the Yiddish theatre. It is consulted by scholars, genealogists, and theatre professionals, and provides basic biographical information on a wide range of creative figures, including playwrights, composers, lyricists, costume and set designers, as well as major and minor actors. Volume 5, the kadoyshim [martyr's] volume, is dedicated entirely to individuals who were murdered in the Holocaust.

Zylbercweig was married twice, the second time to Yiddish actress Celia Zuckerberg. They lived for many years in Los Angeles and were well known in the Jewish community as the hosts of "The Yiddish Radio Hour," a popular daily program.
