= Leksikon fun yidishn teater =

Yiddish reference encyclopedia

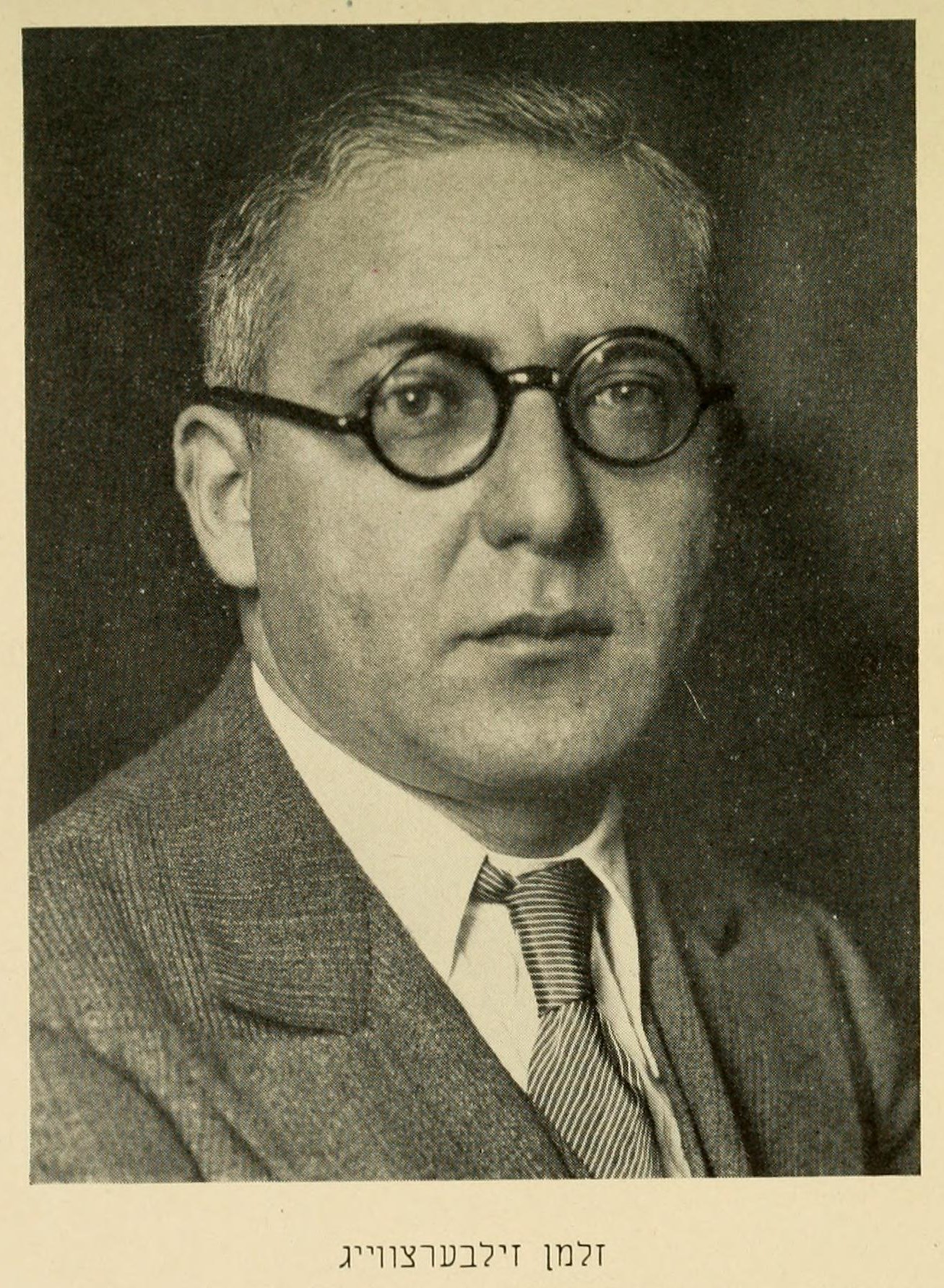
Zalmen Zylbercweig

Leksikon fun yidishn teater (Yiddish: לעקסיקאָן פֿון ייִדישן טעאַטער Lexicon of the Yiddish Theatre or Encyclopedia of the Yiddish Theatre) is a Yiddish language reference encyclopedia compiled by Zalmen Zylbercweig, assisted by Jacob Mestel on two volumes.

The six-volume 3,066 page work contains biographies of more than 3,000 individuals, as well as articles on theatre troupes and plays. The compiler published the first volumes in New York and Warsaw before World War II. Later volumes were published in New York and Mexico City from 1959 to 1969. A seventh volume was prepared for publication, but on Zylbercweig's death it was unable to be completed.

Early on Zylbercweig received support for his project from the Hebrew Actors' Union, which sponsored a 16-page prospectus for the lexicon in 1928; with the Union's help Zylbercweig mailed out a questionnaire to all of its members, the responses to which served as a basis for entries. The first volume of the lexicon appeared in New York in 1931, and the second in Warsaw, in 1934. Zylbercweig raised money for the publication of these volumes through a number of routes, such as banquets, fundraiser performances, pre-sales, and the sales of his other books.

The nature of the Leksikon changed significantly between the second volume and all further volumes. The early volumes were edited so that length of entry reflected the stature of individuals, and attempted to limit information given to the most meaningful details. In the post-War years, however, Zylbercweig understood his mission to be the dissemination of any and all information he could gather, to prevent it being lost to history. Thus, in later volumes the entries are generally longer, and the length of entry does not correspond to the importance of the individual but to the amount of material available about them. Volume 5 is titled kadoyshim band [martyr's volume] and consists entirely of entries for individuals murdered in the Holocaust. Some entries are very short; most lack dates of death.
