= Broder singer =

Jewish itinerant performers in Galicia, Romania, and Russia

The Broderzinger (Yiddish: בראָדער זינגער) or Broder singers, from Brody in Ukraine, were Jewish itinerant performers in Austrian Galicia, Romania, and Russia, professional or semiprofessional songwriters and performers, who from at least the early 19th century sang and danced, often in comic disguises, and who performed short one-act plays. They were often badchonim (traditional wedding entertainers) and meshorerim (singers in cantors' choirs). They were among the first to publicly perform Yiddish-language songs outside of Purim plays and wedding parties, and were an important precursor to Yiddish theatre. They erected miniature stages and entertained customers in taverns, wine cellars, and restaurant gardens.

The first written records of the Broder singers are the remarks of Jews passing through Brody, which was a trading center on a major route of travel ("a stopping point on the travels of Russian Jewish merchants to and from the Leipzig fair."). These records are generally disapproving of the singing of songs when no religious occasion called for music.

Later the term "Broder singer" was applied to performers who had no connection with Brody.

Among the most famous Broder singers were Berl Margulis - better known as Berl Broder (1815–1868) - and Moyshe Prizament and his son Shloyme Prizament. Some of Berl Broder's original songs, along with the works of his son and grandson who continued the tradition of secular Yiddish writing, can be found in his grandson Ber Margulies' book Dray doyres̀ lider fun Berl Broder (Margulies), feliṭonen fun Yom Hatsyoni (YitsḥaḳMargulies), poemen un lider fun Ber Margulies (1957) (free online download from the Yiddish Book Center).
