= Yiddish theatre =

Genre in theater

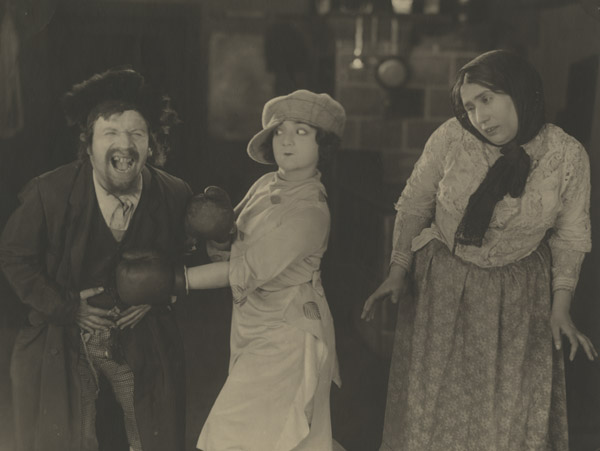
Molly Picon (center) in Bublichki, 1938

Yiddish theatre consists of plays written and performed primarily by Ashkenazi Jews in the Yiddish language. The range of Yiddish theatre is broad: operetta, musical comedy, and satiric or nostalgic revues; melodrama; naturalist drama; expressionist and modernist plays. At its height, its geographical scope was comparably broad: from the late 19th century until just before World War II, professional Yiddish theatre could be found throughout the heavily Jewish areas of Eastern and East Central Europe, but also in Berlin, London, Paris, Buenos Aires and New York City.

Yiddish theatre's roots include the often satiric plays traditionally performed during religious holiday of Purim (known as Purimshpils); the singing of cantors in the synagogues; Jewish secular song and dramatic improvisation; exposure to the theatre traditions of various European countries, and the Jewish literary culture that had grown in the wake of the Jewish enlightenment (Haskalah).

Israil Bercovici wrote that it is through Yiddish theatre that "Jewish culture entered in dialogue with the outside world," both by putting itself on display and by importing theatrical pieces from other cultures.

Themes such as immigration, poverty, integration, and strong ancestral ties can be found in many Yiddish theatre productions.

== History and influences ==
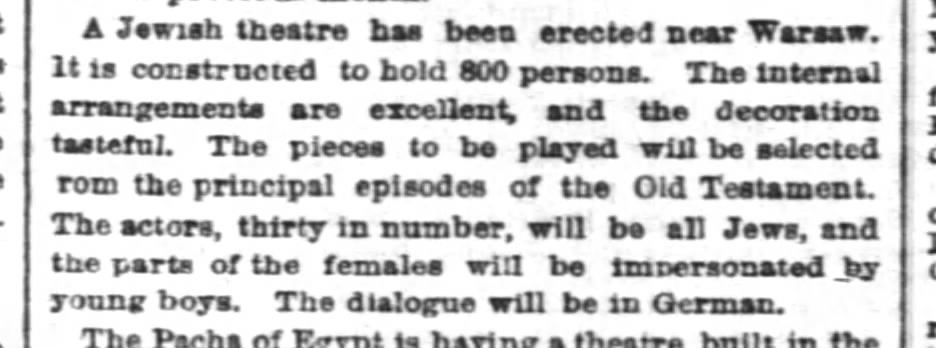
Report on Jewish Theatre – The New York Times, 29 November 1868, page 5

Noah Prilutski (1882–1941) noted that Yiddish theatre did not arise simultaneously with theatre in other European "national" languages; he conjectured that this was at least in part because the Jewish sense of nationality favored Hebrew over Yiddish as a "national" language, but few Jews of the period were actually comfortable using Hebrew outside of a religious/liturgical context. Nonetheless, various types of performances, including those of cantors, preachers, jesters, and instrumental musicians, were a part of Eastern European Jewish life long before the formal advent of Yiddish theatre.

Bercovici suggests that, as with ancient Greek drama, elements of dramatic performance arose in Jewish life as an artistic refinement of religious practice; he highlights references in the Bible to dance, music, or song, especially in the Psalms (Hebrew tehillim, or songs of praise), where some of the headings refer to musical instruments, or to singing in dialogue, either between parts of the choir, or between the choir and the leader of the ritual (Hebrew menatseach). Also, traditional dances were associated with certain holidays, such as Sukkot.

Purim plays – the skits performed by amateur companies around the time of the Purim holiday – were a significant early form of theatrical expression. Often satiric and topical, Purim plays were traditionally performed in the courtyard of the synagogue, because they were considered too profane to be performed inside the building. These made heavy use of masks and other theatrical devices; the masquerade (and the singing and dancing) generally extended to the whole congregation, not just a small set of players. While many Purim plays told the story in the Book of Esther commemorated by the Purim holiday, others used other stories from Jewish scripture, such as the story of Joseph sold by his brothers or the sacrifice of Isaac. Over time, these well-known stories became less a subject matter than a pretext for topical and satiric theatre. Mordechai became a standard role for a clown.

Purim plays were published as early as the early 18th century. At least eight Purim plays were published between 1708 and 1720; most of these do not survive (at least some were burned in autos da fe), but one survives in the Jüdische Merkwürdigkeiten (1714), a collection by Johann Jakob Schudt (1664–1722).

Another similar current in Jewish culture was a tradition of masked dancers performing after weddings. The most elaborate form of this was the Dance of Death, a pageant depicting all layers of a society, which had originated among Sephardic Jews in Spain in the 14th century and had spread through Europe among both Jews and Gentiles. Sixteenth-century Italian Jews had taken music and dance to an even more refined level of art: at that time in Italy there were Jewish virtuosi and dancing masters in Mantua, Ferrara, and Rome, and the first-known troupes of Jewish performers in Europe. Less refined versions of the same also occurred in 18th-century Germany.

Additionally, there was a rich tradition of dialogues in the Jewish poetry known as Tahkemoni, dating back at least to Yehuda al-Harizi in 12th-century Spain. Al-Harizi's work contained dialogues between believer and heretic, man and wife, day and night, land and ocean, wisdom and foolishness, avarice and generosity. Such dialogues figured prominently in early Yiddish theatre.

In the journal Nostalgia in Jewish-American Theatre and Film, 1979-2004, Ben Furnish establishes the deep roots of nostalgia based on Jewish history. Many of these origins are based in stories like that of the Siege of Jerusalem (587 BCE) of Jews from the Holy Land. Shows up to present day productions pull influence from these experiences, creating a concrete picture of Yiddish themes and tenets seen in Jewish theatre.

The origin of theatre in Christian societies in Europe is often traced to Passion Plays and other religious pageants, similar in some ways to the Purim plays. In the Middle Ages, few Jews would have seen these: they were often performed in the courtyards of Christian churches (few of which were near the Jewish ghettos), on Christian holidays, and they often had significant antisemitic elements in their plots and dialogue. However, in later times, the Romanian Orthodox Christmas tradition of Irozii—minstrel shows centered around the figure of Herod the Great (Rom: Irod), which were the origin of Romanian-language theatre—definitely influenced Purim plays and vice versa.

Jews had far more exposure to secular European theatre once that developed. Meistersinger Hans Sachs' many plays on Old Testament topics were widely admired by the Jews of the German ghettos, and from the 16th century through the 18th, the biblical story of Esther was the most popular theatrical theme in Christian Europe, often under the Latin name Acta Ahasuerus.

== Early years (pre-1876) ==
Professional Yiddish theatre is generally dated from 1876, although there is scattered evidence of earlier efforts.

Besides some 19 amateur Yiddish-language theatrical troupes in and around Warsaw in the 1830s, there was also, according to one contemporary source, a professional company that in 1838 performed before a receptive audience of both Jews and Gentiles a five-act drama Moses, by a certain A. Schertspierer of Vienna, with "well-drawn characters and good dramatic situations and language." The same source relates that this theatre had among its patrons a number of Russian military officers, including one general who was considered a "protector" of it – a circumstance that suggests the difficulties it faced.

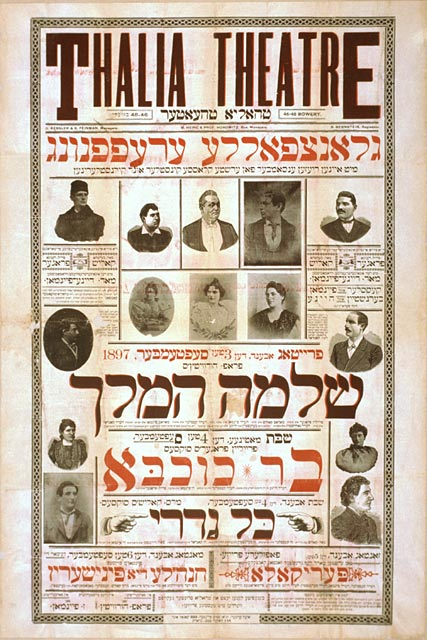
Thalia Theatre poster (Josef Kroger, New York, 1897)

Around the same time, there are indications of a traveling Yiddish-language theatre troupe in Galicia, organized along the lines of an English or Italian theatre troupe.

In 1854, two rabbinical students from Zhytomyr put on a play in Berdichev. Shortly afterward, the Ukrainian Jew Abraham Goldfaden, generally considered the founder of the first professional Yiddish theatre troupe, attended that same rabbinical school, and while there is known to have played (in 1862) a woman's role in a play, Serkele, by Solomon Ettinger. Shortly after that (1869, according to one source), Goldfaden wrote a dialogue Tsvey Shkheynes (Two Neighbors), apparently intended for the stage, and published with moderate success. A short-lived Yiddish theater in Odessa in 1864 performed dramas Esther and Athalia. Abraham Baer Gottlober's Decktuch, like Ettinger's Serkele, was written between 1830 and 1840, but published much later; Israel Aksenfeld (died c. 1868) wrote several dramas in Yiddish, which were probably not staged in his lifetime. Another early Yiddish dramatist was Joel Baer Falkovich (Reb Chaimele der Koẓin, Odessa, 1866; Rochel die Singerin, Zhytomyr, 1868). Solomon Jacob Abramowitsch's Die Takse (1869) has the form of a drama, but, like Eliakim Zunser's later Mekirat Yosef (Vilnius, 1893), it was not intended for the stage.

Hersh Leib Sigheter (1829–1930) wrote satirical Purim plays on an annual basis and hired boys to play in them. Although often objected to by rabbis, these plays were popular, and were performed not only on Purim but for as much as a week afterwards in various locations.

Another current that led equally to professional Yiddish theatre was a tradition resembling that of the troubadours or Minnesänger, apparently growing out of the music associated with Jewish weddings, and often involving singers who also functioned as cantors in synagogues. The first records of the early Brodersänger or Broder singers are the remarks of Jews passing through Brody, which was on a major route of travel, generally disapproving of the singing of songs when no particular occasion called for music. The most famous of the singers from Brody was the itinerant Berl Margulis (1815–1868), known as Berl Broder, "Berl from Brody"; 24 of his 30 surviving songs are in the form of dialogues. Another influential performer in this style was Benjamin Wolf Ehrenkrantz (1826–1883), known as Velvel Zbarjer. Bercovici describes his work as "mini-melodramas in song".

Such performers, who performed at weddings, in the salons of the wealthy, in the summer gardens, and in other secular gathering places of the Eastern European Jews, were not mere singers. They often used costumes and often improvised spoken material between songs, especially when working in groups. Israel Grodner, later Goldfaden's first actor, participated in an outdoor concert in Odessa in 1873 with dialogues between songs comparable to much of what was in Goldfaden's earliest plays. Goldfaden himself was already a noted poet, and many of his poems had been set to music and had become popular songs, some of which were used in that 1873 performance.

Finally, around this time Yiddish was establishing itself as a literary language, and some Jews with secular interests were familiar with the dominant theatrical traditions of their respective countries; given this literary intellectual culture, within a year or two of Goldfaden's founding the first professional Yiddish theatre troupe, there were multiple troupes, multiple playwrights, and more than a few serious Yiddish theatre critics and theoreticians.

== Romania ==
Abraham Goldfaden is generally considered the founder of the first professional Yiddish theatre troupe, which he founded in Iaşi, Romania in 1876, and later moved to Bucharest. The founding of Yiddish theatre in Romania was largely an outgrowth of the country's antisemitic labor policies, as entertainment was one of the few industries in which Jews were not subject to a maximum hiring quota. Goldfaden's career also took him to Imperial Russia, Lemberg in Habsburg Galicia (today Lviv in Ukraine), and New York City. Within two years of Goldfaden's founding of his troupe, there were several rival troupes in Bucharest, mostly founded by former members of Goldfaden's troupe. Most of these troupes followed Goldfaden's original formula of musical vaudeville and light comedy, while Goldfaden himself turned more toward relatively serious operettas about biblical and historical subjects, especially after his own company left Bucharest for an extended tour of the cities of Imperial Russia.

Goldfaden's troupe began as all-male; while they soon acquired actresses, as well, it remained relatively common in Yiddish theatre for female roles, especially comic roles, to be played by men. (Women also sometimes played men's roles: Molly Picon was a famous Shmendrick.) Many early Yiddish theatre pieces were constructed around a very standard set of roles: "a prima donna, a soubrette, a comic, a lover, a villain, a villainess (or "intriguer"), an older man and woman for character roles, and one or two more for spares as the plot might require," and a musical component that might range from a single fiddler to an orchestra. This was very convenient for a repertory company, especially a traveling one. Both at the start and well into the great years of Yiddish theatre, the troupes were often in one or another degree family affairs, with a husband, wife, and often their offspring playing in the same troupe.

At its high end, early Yiddish theatre was noted for its pageantry. A pageant about the coronation of Solomon, presented on the occasion of the 1881 coronation of Carol I of Romania was described by Ion Ghica as "among the most imposing things that paraded the coronation"; he acquired the costumes for the Romanian National Theatre, which he headed at the time.

Both the nature and aspirations of early professional Yiddish theatre are reflected in Moses Schwarzfeld's 1877 remarks calling for serious and "educational" Jewish theatre: "If we write only comedies or if we only imitate German, Romanian and French pieces translated into Yiddish, all we will have is a secondary Jewish stage ... just making people laugh and cry is an evil for us Jews in Romania." Goldfaden himself agreed with such sentiments; later recalling his views at the time, he wrote: "If I have arrived at having a stage, I want it to be a school for you ... Laugh heartily if I amuse you with my jokes, while I, watching you, feel my heart crying. Then, brothers, I'll give you a drama, a tragedy drawn from life, and you shall also cry—while my heart shall be glad."

B. Nathansohn, correspondent of the Warsaw-based Jewish newspaper Hamelitz visited Romania in the summer of 1878 and wrote, "When a Jew enters a Yiddish theatre in Bucharest he is thunderstruck hearing the Yiddish language in all its splendor and radiance", and called upon Goldfaden to create similar theatres in Warsaw, Lublin, Vilna, Berdichev, and Balta.

While Yiddish theatre was an immediate hit with the broad masses of Jews, was generally liked and admired by Jewish intellectuals and many Gentile intellectuals, a small but socially powerful portion of the Jewish community, centered among Orthodox and Hasidic Jews, remained opposed to it. Besides complaints about the mingling of men and women in public and about the use of music and dance outside of sacred contexts, the two main criticisms from this quarter were (1) that the Yiddish "jargon" was being promoted to the detriment of "proper" Hebrew and (2) that satire against Hasidim and others would not necessarily be understood as satire and would make Jews look ridiculous. Bercovici quotes an anonymous 1885 article as responding to these criticisms by saying (1) that all Jews speak some modern language and why should Yiddish be any more detrimental to Hebrew than Romanian, Russian, or German; and (2) that the Gentiles who would come to Yiddish theatre would not be the antisemites, they would be those who already knew and liked Jews, and that they would recognize satire for what it was, adding that these criticisms were "nothing" when weighed against the education that Yiddish theatre was bringing to the lower classes.

Writing of Sigmund Mogulesko's troupe in Romania in 1884, and probably referring to the plays of Moses Horowitz and Joseph Lateiner, Moses Gaster wrote that Yiddish theatre "represents scenes from our history known by only a tiny minority, refreshing, therefore, secular memory" and "shows us our defects, which we have like all men, but not with a tendency to strike at our own immorality with a tendency towards ill will, but only with an ironic spirit that does not wound us, as we are wounded by representations on other stages, where the Jew plays a degrading role."

Goldfaden's plays ultimately formed a canon of Yiddish theater, and were performed continuously for over fifty years; in the theatre world they were reverently regarded as a kind of "Torah from Sinai", and the characters of the plays permeated Jewish cultural life over several generations.

== Russia ==
If Yiddish theatre was born in Romania, its youth occurred in Imperial Russia, largely in what is now Ukraine. Israel Rosenberg's troupe (which later had a series of managers, including Goldfaden's brother Tulya, and which at one point split in two, with one half led by actor Jacob Adler) gave Russia's first professional Yiddish theatre performance in Odessa in 1878. Goldfaden himself soon came to Odessa, pushing Rosenberg's troupe into the provinces, and Osip Mikhailovich Lerner and N.M. Sheikevitch also founded a Yiddish theatre at Odessa, which for several years became the capital of Yiddish theatre.

Russia offered a more sophisticated audience than rural Romania: many Russian Jews were regular attendees of Russian-language theatre, and Odessa was a first-rate theatre city. In this context, serious melodramatic operettas, and even straight plays, took their place in the repertoire among the lighter vaudevilles and comedies that had thus far predominated. All three major troupes in Odessa did their own productions of Karl Gutzkow's play Uriel Acosta (with Goldfaden's production being an operetta).

However, even this increased sophistication could not compare to later, more ambitious efforts of the Yiddish theater. Looking back on this period, although acknowledging certain of Goldfaden's plays from this era as "masterpieces", Jacob Adler saw this as a period of relative mediocrity compared to what came later. "For three years I... wandered in the cave of the Witch and the motley of Shmendrick and what did I really know of my trade?" he describes himself as thinking in 1883. "If someday I return to Yiddish theater let me at least not be so ignorant." Much of the theater performed during this period was later referred to as shund, or trash, though critics such as Itsik Manger felt it possessed a naive energy and was unfairly maligned.

What seemed, for a time, a boundless future in Russia was cut short by the anti-Jewish reaction following the assassination of Tsar Alexander II; Yiddish theatre was banned, under an order effective September 14, 1883. This ban caused an exodus of Yiddish actors and playwrights to other countries – Poland, in particular – where they had the freedom to perform.

The Moscow Yiddish Theater, or Jewish Kamerny Theatre in Moscow, or new Yiddish Chamber Theater, directed by Aleksey Granovsky, and with contributors including Marc Chagall, was founded in Petrograd in June 1919 as an experimental workshop then became the Moscow State Jewish Theatre.

== London ==
Of the next era of Yiddish theatre, Adler, who arrived in London with his wife Sonya in 1883, wrote, "...if Yiddish theater was destined to go through its infancy in Russia, and in America grew to manhood and success, then London was its school." The arrival of Adler and his troupe beckoned the era of professional Yiddish theatre in London, and as word of the troupe's arrival started to spread throughout the East End, they began to receive financial assistance from the local community which allowed them to form the Russian Jewish Operatic Company. In London in the 1880s, playing in small theatre clubs "on a stage the size of a cadaver", not daring to play on a Friday night or to light a fire on stage on a Saturday afternoon (both because of the Jewish Sabbath), forced to use a cardboard ram's horn when playing Uriel Acosta so as not to blaspheme, Yiddish theatre nonetheless took on much of what was best in European theatrical tradition.

In this period, the plays of Schiller first entered the repertoire of Yiddish theatre, beginning with The Robbers, the start of a vogue that would last a quarter of a century. Adler records that, like Shakespeare, Schiller was "revered" by the broad Jewish public, not just by intellectuals, admired for his "almost socialist view of society", although his plays were often radically adapted for the Yiddish stage, shortening them and dropping Christian, antisemitic, and classical mythological references There were several smaller Jewish theatre groups in Manchester and Glasgow.

The opening of a Yiddish theatre at the Pavilion Theatre in 1906 marked a new era for the Yiddish theatre in London, providing a permanent home for the theatre for almost three decades. The theatre was home to a number of actor-managers throughout its history, the first being Sigmund Feinman, a Yiddish actor and playwright who grew to prominence on the American Yiddish stage. Feinman staged plays such as Gordin's The Jewish King Lear, for which Adler returned for a guest appearance in the lead role. The Pavilion Theatre closed as a Yiddish theatre in 1935. It was succeeded by the Grand Palais Theatre and the New Yiddish Theatre Company at the Adler Hall, Whitechapel.

== Poland ==
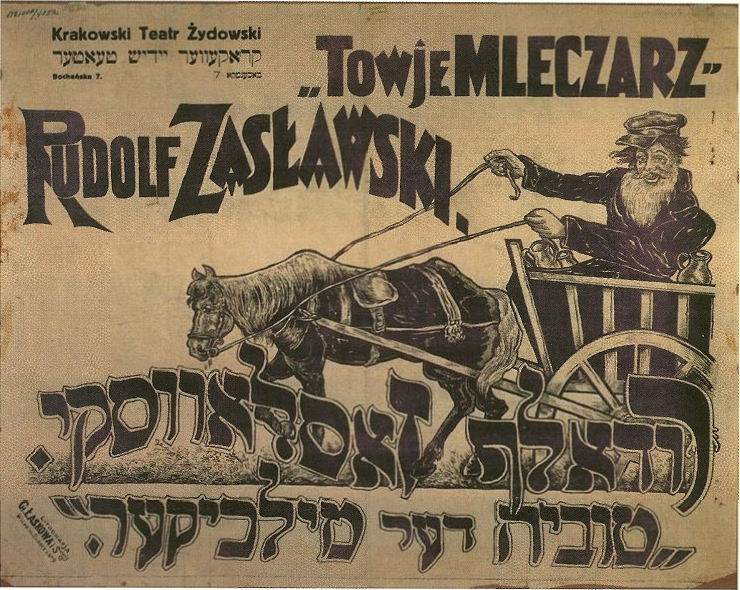
Poster for Tevye The Milkman, Krakow Yiddish Theatre

Poland was an important center of Yiddish theatrical activity, with more than 400 Yiddish theatrical companies performing in the country during the interwar period. One of the most important companies, the avant-garde Vilna Troupe (Vilner trupe), formed in Vilna, as its name suggests, but moved to Warsaw in 1917. The Vilna Troupe employed some of the most accomplished actors on the Yiddish stage, including Abraham Morewski, who played the Miropolyer tsaddik in the first performance of The Dybbuk, and Joseph Buloff, who was the lead actor of the Vilna Troupe and went on to further accomplishments with Maurice Schwartz's Yiddish Art Theater in New York. It was in Warsaw that the Vilna Troupe staged the first performance of The Dybbuk in 1920, a play that made a profound and lasting impression on Yiddish theater and world culture. The Vilna Troupe inspired the creation of more avant-garde and ambitious Yiddish theatrical companies, including the Warsaw Yiddish Art Theater, founded by Zygmunt Turkow and Ida Kamińska in 1924, the Warsaw New Yiddish Theater, founded by Jonas Turkow in 1929, and the Young Theater, founded by Michał Weichert in 1932. The latter was particularly known for political engagement, staging an attention-getting avant-garde performance of the play Boston, by Bernhard Blum, about the trial of Sacco and Vanzetti, in 1933.

In addition to the serious artistic efforts of the art theaters, kleynkunst cabaret flourished in Poland during the interwar period, combining musical performances with standup comedy. The most celebrated practitioners of this kind of performance were Shimon Dzigan and Israel Shumacher, who began their lifelong Yiddish comedy career at the theater Ararat in Łódź in 1927. Puppet and marionette theater also attained great artistic significance, often staging satirical shows on contemporary social issues.

Yiddish theater in Poland reflected the political preoccupations of its time. They struggled financially, like all Jewish cultural institutions during that period, even while flourishing for a time during a more liberal political atmosphere. Actors and directors, just like others during that period, were highly aware of labor relations, and tried to create egalitarian working relationships. Organizations such as the Yiddish Actors' Union, based in Warsaw, played a crucial role in providing a forum for theater professionals to discuss these issues and try new solutions, such as collectively run theaters. Theatrical performances themselves also addressed social issues.

== The Americas ==
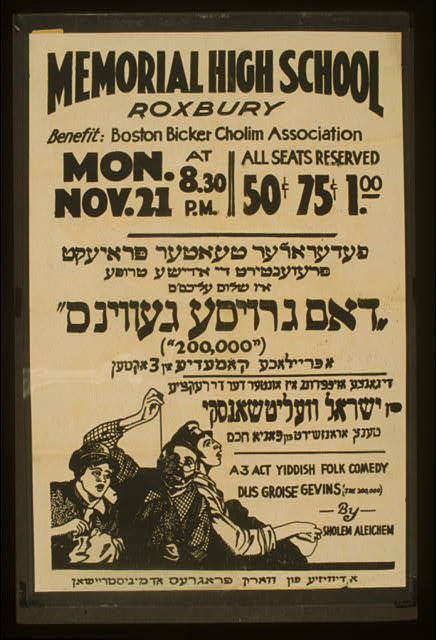
WPA poster, Boston, 1938

The 1883 Russian ban on Yiddish theatre (lifted in 1904) effectively pushed it to Western Europe and then to America. Over the next few decades, successive waves of Yiddish performers arrived in New York (and, to a lesser extent, in Berlin, London, Vienna, and Paris), some simply as artists seeking an audience, but many as a result of persecutions, pogroms and economic crises in Eastern Europe. Professional Yiddish theatre in London began in 1884, and flourished until the mid-1930s. By 1896, Kalman Juvelier's troupe was the only one that remained in Romania, where Yiddish theatre had started, although Mogulesko sparked a revival there in 1906. There was also some activity in Warsaw and Lvov, which were under Austrian rather than Russian rule.

In this era, Yiddish theatre existed almost entirely on stage, rather than in texts. The Jewish Encyclopedia of 1901–1906 reported, "There are probably less than fifty printed Yiddish dramas, and the entire number of written dramas of which there is any record hardly exceeds five hundred. Of these at least nine-tenths are translations or adaptations."

=== United States ===
Yiddish Theater in the United States has been described as "a keepsake of home, and yet also a means of acculturation" for the 2.5 million Jews who immigrated from 1881 to 1924. Throughout the 1880s and 1890s, amateur theatrical companies presented Yiddish productions in New York City, leading to regular weekend performances at theatres such as the Bowery Garden, the National and the Thalia, with unknowns such as Boris Thomashefsky emerging as stars. The Thalia Theatre sought to change the material of the Yiddish stage to better reform the material that was being produced. "The reformers of the Yiddish stage, Jacob Gordin later explained, wanted to "utilize the theatre for higher purposes; to derive from it not only amusement, but education." Jacob Gordin himself had numerous times tried to get his plays onto the Windsor stage without luck. "Gordin successfully challenged Lateiner and Hurwitz in 1891–1892 when he entered the Yiddish theatre with an avowed purpose of reforming Yiddish drama." Rather than "pandering to the public's taste for cheap shund (trash) plays, he sought to secure goodwill of the East Side's intelligentsia with literature and increasingly incorporated the concepts of "true art" and "serious drama" into their public image." Professional companies soon developed and flourished, so that between 1890 and 1940, there were over 200 Yiddish theaters or touring Yiddish theatre troupes in the United States. At many times, a dozen Yiddish theatre groups existed in New York City alone, with the Yiddish Theater District, sometimes referred to as the "Jewish Rialto", centered on Second Avenue in what is now the East Village, but was then considered part of the Jewish Lower East Side, which often rivaled Broadway in scale and quality. At the time the U.S. entered World War I, there were 22 Yiddish theaters and two Yiddish vaudeville houses in New York City alone. Original plays, musicals, and even translations of Hamlet and Richard Wagner's operas were performed, both in the United States and Eastern Europe during this period.

Yiddish theatre is said to have two artistic golden ages, the first in the realistic plays produced in New York City in the late 19th century, and the second in the political and artistic plays written and performed in Russia and New York in the 1920s. Professional Yiddish theatre in New York began in 1886 with a troupe founded by Zigmund Mogulesko. At the time of Goldfaden's funeral in 1908, The New York Times wrote, "The dense Jewish population on the lower east side of Manhattan shows in its appreciation of its own humble Yiddish poetry and the drama much the same spirit that controlled the rough audiences of the Elizabethan theatre. There, as in the London of the sixteenth century, is a veritable intellectual renascence."

Jacob Dinezon quipped: "The still young Yiddish theatre that went to America did not recognize its father just three or four years later, nor would it obey or come when called." Responding in a letter to Dinezon, Goldfaden wrote: "I do not have any complaints about the American Yiddish theatre not recognizing its father... it is not rare that children do not recognize their parents; or even that the parents cannot travel the road their children have gone. But I do have complaints, though I do not know to whom, that my dear Jewish child is growing up to be a coarse, un-Jewish, insolent boor, and I expect that some day I will be cursed for that very thing that I brought into the world... Here in America ... it has thrown all shame aside and not only is it not learning anything, it has forgotten whatever good it used to know.""

"In February 1902, Jewish builder and philanthropist Harry Fischel bought a piece of land of about 10,000 square feet, at the south corner of Grand and Chrystie Streets with the intention to erect on the site a theatre for Yiddish performances." At the time of the opening of the Grand Theatre in New York (1903), New York's first purpose-built Yiddish theater, The New York Times noted: "That the Yiddish population is composed of confirmed theatregoers has been evident for a long time, and for many years at least three theatres, which had served their day of usefulness for the English dramas, have been pressed into service, providing amusement for the people of the Ghetto."

Around the same time, Lincoln Steffens wrote that the theatre being played at the time in Yiddish outshone what was being played in English. Yiddish New York theatregoers were familiar with the plays of Ibsen, Tolstoy, and even Shaw long before these works played on Broadway, and the high calibre of Yiddish language acting became clear as Yiddish actors began to cross over to Broadway, first with Jacob Adler's tour de force performance as Shylock in a 1903 production of The Merchant of Venice, but also with performers such as Bertha Kalich, who moved back and forth between the city's leading Yiddish-language and English-language stages.

Nina Warnke wrote: "In his memoirs, A. Mukdoni summed up the ambivalent feelings Russian Jewish intellectuals had about the influx of American plays and players onto their soil on the eve of the war: 'The American repertoire—be it the good or bad one—and the American actors—be they the good or bad ones—made us realize that the Yiddish theatre is really in America and that here in Poland and Russia the Yiddish theatre lives off the fallen crumbs that it collects under the rich American table.'

"Mukdoyni was certainly correct in realizing that the center of Yiddish theatrical production was in New York, and that Poland was turning into its cultural colony. This theatrical expansion eastward, which had begun slowly in the 1890s because of the great need in Eastern Europe to fill the vacuum of repertoire, turned into a conscious American export item during the 1910S. At that time, the immigrant community in New York as a whole, and the Yiddish theatre in particular, had matured, and they were confident enough of their power and unique status to begin to actively seek acknowledgement, accolades, and financial gain beyond the local and regional spheres. The war would only briefly interrupt this emerging trend. What Clara Young was one of the first to discover, actors such as Molly Picon and Ludwig Satz would realize during the interwar period: Poland offered not only a lucrative market for American Yiddish actors, but also an environment where up-and-coming performers could more easily achieve a career breakthrough than in New York. In the early years of immigration, Eastern Europe had served as a necessary recruitment pool to feed the American Yiddish theatre with new stage talent; shortly before World War I, it began to provide new audiences and marketing possibilities for the creative energies that had gathered in New York."

Some of the most important Yiddish playwrights of the first era included: Jacob Gordin (1853–1909), known for plays such as The Yiddish King Lear and for his translations and adaptations of Tolstoy, Solomon Libin (1872–1955), David Pinski (1872–1959), and Leon Kobrin (1872–1946).

This first golden age of Yiddish drama in America ended when the period from 1905 to 1908 brought half a million new Jewish immigrants to New York. Once again, as in the 1880s, the largest audience for Yiddish theatre was for lighter fare. The Adlers and Keni Liptzin hung on doing classic theatre, but Boris and Bessie Thomashefsky returned to the earlier style, making a fortune off of what the Adlers despised as shund ("trash") theatre. Plays like Joseph Lateiner's The Jewish Heart succeeded at this time, while Gordin's late plays like Dementia Americana (1909) were initially commercial failures. It would be 1911 before the trend was reversed, with Adler's commercially successful production of Tolstoy's The Living Corpse (also known as Redemption), translated into Yiddish by Kobrin. Both the more and the less serious Yiddish theatre persisted. As Lulla Rosenfeld writes, "Art and shund alike would find their audience."

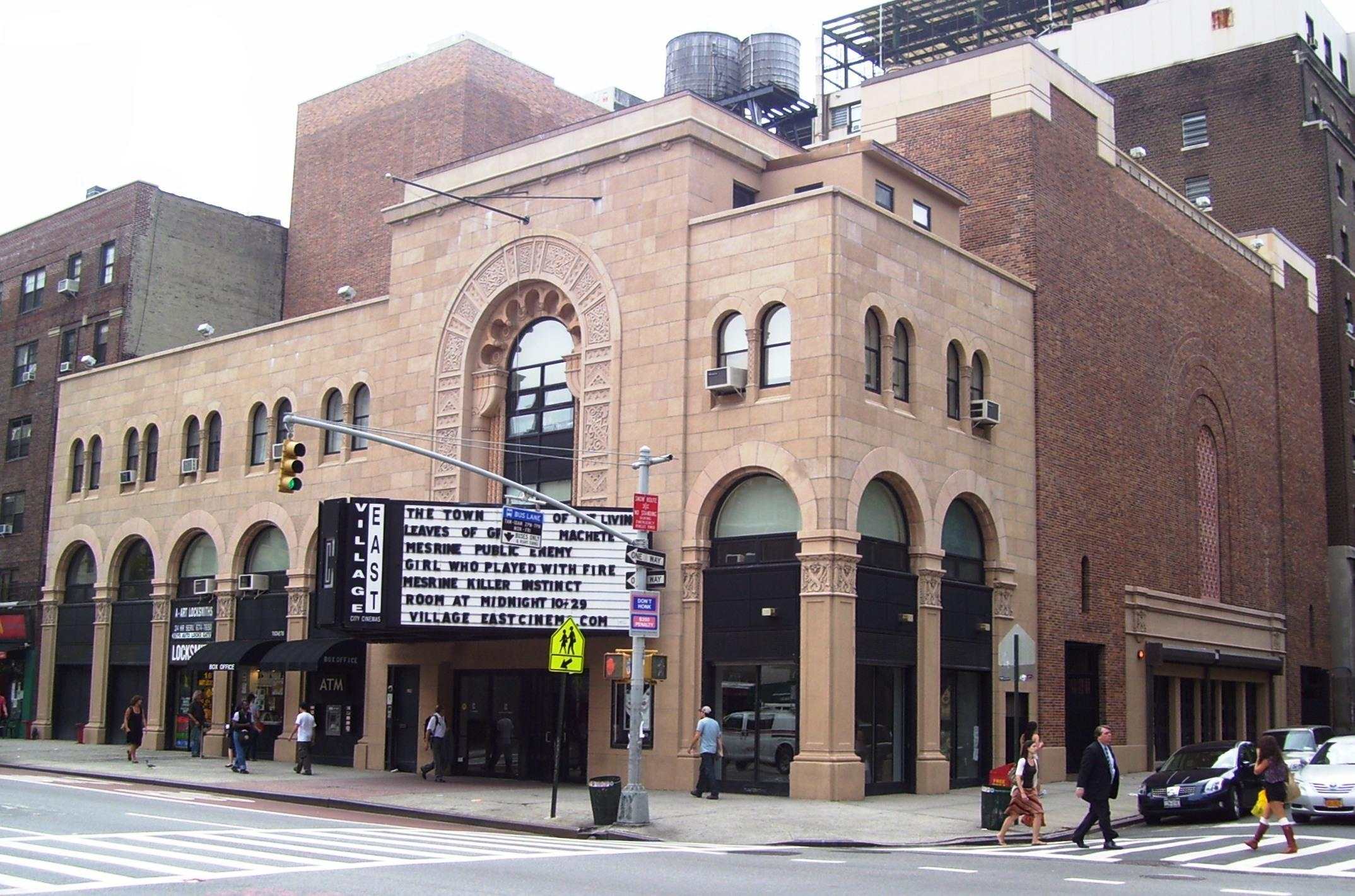
In 1926, developer Louis N. Jaffe built this theatre for actor Maurice Schwartz ("Mr. Second Avenue") and his Yiddish Art Theatre. The area was known as the "Jewish Rialto" at the time. After four seasons it became the Yiddish Folks Theatre, then a movie theatre, the home of the Phoenix Theatre, the Entermedia Theatre, and now a movie theater again, the Village East Cinema. It was designated a New York City landmark in 1993.

The Yiddish theatre continued to have its ups and downs. In 1918, Isaac Goldberg could look around himself and reasonably write that, "...the Yiddish stage, despite the fact that it has produced its greatest dramatists only yesterday"... is already, despite its financial successes, next door to extinction." As it happens, it was on the dawn of a second era of greatness: a 1925 New York Times article asserts that "the Yiddish theater has been thoroughly Americanized... it is now a stable American institution and no longer dependent on immigration from Eastern Europe. People who can neither speak nor write Yiddish attend Yiddish stage performances and pay Broadway prices on Second Avenue." This is attributed to the fact that Yiddish theatre is "only one of... [the] expressions" of a New York Jewish cultural life "in full flower".

Famous plays of this second golden era were The Dybbuk (1919), by S. Ansky, considered a revolutionary play in both Yiddish and mainstream theatre. It has been translated into many languages and performed thousands of times all over the world, on stage and on television; there have been several movies. It is now regarded as the crown jewel of the Jewish theatre. Operas, ballets, symphonic suites and other musical compositions have been based on The Dybbuk. In earlier years it was considered so significant that parodies about The Dybbuk were written and performed in Europe and the United States.

After the rising popularity of Yiddish theatre in the Americas, shows such as Fiddler on the Roof, created by Joseph Stein and Sheldon Harnick, brought the tenets of Yiddish theatre to the Broadway stage.

An-sky wrote a number of other plays, four of which are included in his Gezamelte shriften, long out of print. One ("Day and Night") is, like The Dybbuk, a Hasidic Gothic story. The other three plays have revolutionary themes, and were originally written in Russian: Father and Son, In a Conspiratorial Apartment and The Grandfather. All four have recently been republished in a bilingual Yiddish-English edition.

Also notable are The Golem by H. Leivick (1888–1962), as well as the plays of Sholem Aleichem.

Yiddish theatre after the Second World War was revived with the writing and performance of The Warsaw Ghetto.

Many ground-breaking performers were Jewish-American individuals; Ben Furnish in his work Nostalgia in Jewish-American Theatre and film, 1979-2004 notes that Elizabeth Taylor and Marilyn Monroe were both of Jewish-American descent.

Several of America's most influential 20th-century acting teachers, such as Stella Adler (daughter of Jacob and Sara Adler and sister of actor Luther Adler) and Lee Strasberg, had their first tastes of theatre in Yiddish. Though some of the methods developed by them and other members of the Group Theatre were reactions to the often melodramatic and larger-than-life style of Yiddish theatre, this style nonetheless informed their theories and left its stamp on them. Yiddish theatre was also highly influential on what is still known as Jewish humor.

=== Argentina ===
Buenos Aires, Argentina figured prominently in Yiddish theatre between the wars. While pre-war Yiddish theatre in Argentina had bordered on burlesque, shortly after World War I Thomashefsky and others brought their companies to Buenos Aires for the off-season when New York theaters were closed for the summer (the Argentine winter). According to Michael Terry, Buenos Aires experienced a "golden age" of Yiddish theatre in the 1930s and 1950s, becoming "the second city of the world history of Yiddish theater." Four theatres presented plays in Yiddish regularly: the Soleil and the Excelsior (in the Abasto), the Mitre (in Villa Crespo), and the Ombú (which is where the AMIA is today). Actors such as Samuel Goldenberg, Jacob Ben-Ami, Maurice Schwartz, and Joseph Buloff appeared to sell out crowds. Cafes such as El Cristal and the Internacional also presented Yiddish vaudeville numbers, with actors such as Jevel Katz, Jennie Goldstein, and Moyshe Oysher. To reach additional audiences they also traveled to other Argentinean cities, such as Rosario, Córdoba, Moisesville and Basabilbaso. Sometimes they brought Yiddish translations of other plays as in 1949 when Joseph Buloff played in Death of a Salesman/Toyt fun a seylsman, at the Soleil Theatre. This was the first time that the Argentinean public saw an Arthur Miller's play.

Argentina began experiencing a progressive decrease in Yiddish plays by the 1960s. The season was short and performances were held only on weekends and several theatres closed. In 1972, the Mitre Theatre, the last standing playhouse of the Yiddish theatre scene, was shut down.

== Soviet Union ==
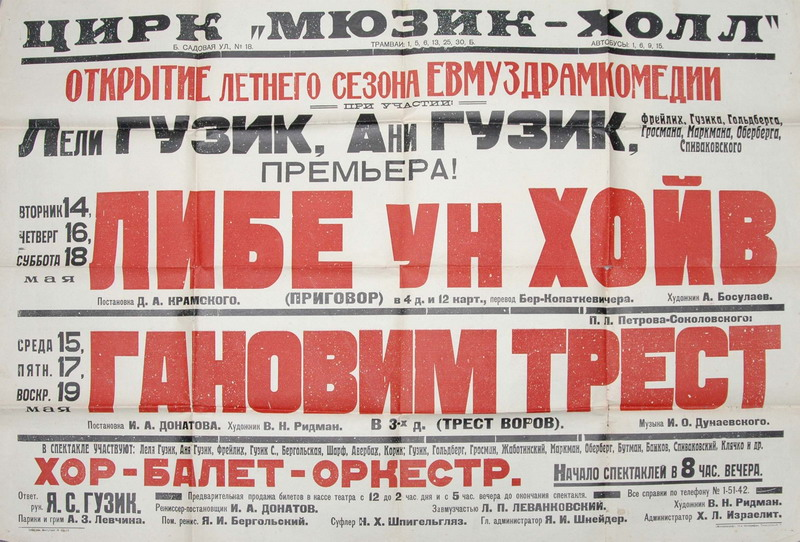
Poster for Jewmuzdramcomedy (Jewish theatre). Moscow, Russia, 1920

Moscow State Yiddish Theatre (MosGOSET) was established in 1920 and became an archetype for other similar establishments under the Soviet rule. Headed by Aleksandr Granovskii, the theatre functioned both as a tool of Soviet propaganda and a genuine centre of artistic creativity. A school established by the staff of the theatre provided cadres for Yiddish theatres in other locations, where the majority of Soviet Jewish population was concentrated. In 1925, Ukrainian and Belarusian divisions of the State Yiddish Theatre (GOSET) were established in Kharkiv and Minsk respectively, followed by smaller local theatres in Kyiv (1929), Odessa (1930), Vinnytsia (1934) and Zhytomyr (1935). In 1934 the Ukrainian GOSET was relocated to Kyiv. The Birobidzhan State Yiddish Theatre, headed by Emmanuil Kazakevich, was founded in the same year. Following the Soviet annexations of Western Ukraine, Baltic republics and Bessarabia in 1939-1940, State Yiddish Theatres were established in Lviv, Ternopil, Białystok, Grodno, Vilnius, Kaunas, Riga and Kishinev.

Soviet Yiddish theatres were obliged to perform compositions by modern Soviet Jewish authors, which were dedicated mostly to revolutionary themes, including propaganda pieces. However, some plays, such as those written by David Bergelson and Peretz Markish, were genuinely popular. Modern adaptations of well-known pre-revolutionary plays, including ones by Sholom Aleichem and Abraham Goldfaden, were also performed, although they were normally reinterpreted according to the needs of the Soviet state. However, with the rise of official antisemitism in the postwar era, Yiddish theatres in the Soviet Union encountered increasing difficulties. The state-sponsored assassination of Moscow Yiddish Theatre's director Solomon Mikhoels in 1948 signalled the beginning of an end for the Jewish scene, and in the next year all Soviet State Yiddish Theatres were closed down, with many people associated with them being arrested.

== Sweden ==
After the war Yiddish theater enjoyed great popularity in Sweden and all the great stars performed there. Since 2000, Yiddish has been recognized in Sweden as an official minority language.

== Post-Holocaust ==
Like the rest of Yiddish-language culture, Yiddish theatre was devastated by the Holocaust. Most of the world's Yiddish-speakers were killed and many theatres were destroyed. Many of the surviving Yiddish-speaking Ashkenazim emigrated to Israel, where many assimilated into the emerging Hebrew-language culture, since Yiddish was looked down upon and Zionists promoted Hebrew as a language of Jewish unity. In the Soviet Union, the Moscow State Jewish Theatre continued to perform until 1948, when it was shut down.

Although its glory days have passed, Yiddish theatre companies still perform in various Jewish communities. The Folksbiene (People's Theatre) company in New York City is still active 107 years after it was founded. New Yiddish Rep, founded in New York City in 2007, produces Yiddish shows for a younger audience than the senior-citizen oriented Folksbiene. The Dora Wasserman Yiddish Theatre of Montreal, Quebec, Canada has been active since 1958.

In Melbourne, Australia, the Kadimah Jewish Cultural Centre and Library, home for Yiddish language and theatre, has been operating for over 110 years. The Kadimah Yiddish Theatre has presented new plays in Yiddish as well as new interpretations of Yiddish classical plays and music. The Kadimah also offers its audience a large library of on-demand digital content.

The Ester Rachel and Ida Kaminska Jewish Theater in Warsaw, Poland and the State Jewish Theater in Bucharest, Romania also continue to perform plays in Yiddish, with simultaneous translations into Polish and Romanian respectively. Although Yiddish theatre never truly caught on in the state of Israel, the Yiddishpiel Theatre company (founded in 1987) is still producing and performing new plays in Tel-Aviv. The longest-running Yiddish production in Israel, which was also one of the few commercial Yiddish theatrical successes post Holocaust, was Pesach Burstein's production of Itzik Manger's Songs of the Megillah (Yiddish: Megille Lider). It also released on Broadway in 1968 to favourable reviews as Megilla of Itzik Manger. The career of the Burstein troupe documented in the 2000 documentary film The Komediant. Opera singer and actor David Serero is bringing Yiddish theatre, adapted in English, back to the Lower East Side of New York, with plays such as the Yiddish King Lear.

A Yiddish production of Fiddler on the Roof (Fidler Afn Dakh) by Folksbiene opened at Stage 42 in 2019, one of the largest off-Broadway theaters. It had been a hit in 2018 at the Museum of Jewish Heritage in downtown Manhattan.

New Yiddish Rep produced Yiddish versions of "Waiting for Godot," "Death of a Salesman," and "God of Vengeance," and in 2023, a new, original Yiddish drama called "The Gospel According to Chaim" by Mikhl Yashinsky.

== In popular culture ==
The 1987 musical On Second Avenue is an off-Broadway musical and looks back at Yiddish theatre on New York's Second Avenue. It had a successful revival in 2005, with a cast led by Mike Burstyn, and was nominated for two Drama Desk Awards.

The author of Nostalgia in Jewish-American Theatre and Film, 1979-2004 Ben Furnish produces examples of modern playwrights that produce work consistent with the principles and tenets of Yiddish theatre, such as Eleanor Reissa, Miriam Shmuelevitch-Hoffman, and David Pinski. While these are current producers and writers, the themes within the productions remain similar to those of classic Jewish works over the years.

One of Alan Menken's first musicals, the c.1974 Dear Worthy Editor, was based on the letters-to-the-editor of Jewish-American newspaper Jewish Daily Forward, featuring the struggles of Eastern-European Jews from the turn of the century as they tried to assimilate while hold onto their culture.

== See also ==
- Amurzet
- California Institute for Yiddish Culture and Language
- Folksbiene
- Fyvush Finkel
- Jewish Theatre in Warsaw
- Moscow State Jewish Theater
- Rachel Holzer, leading Yiddish Australian actress and director
- Solomon Mikhoels
- Secular Jewish culture
- Second Avenue (Manhattan)
- State Jewish Theater (Romania)
