= Joseph Brody =

Russian-born American Jewish composer (c. (1876–1937)

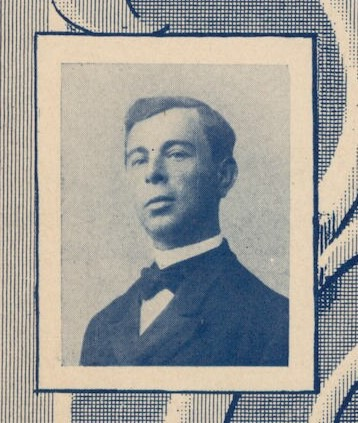
Portrait of Joseph Brody from Dos Yidishe herz score, 1909

Joseph Brody (Yiddish: יוסף בּרױדי Yossef Broydi) (1876/1877 – 1937) was an American Jewish composer who wrote for the Yiddish theatre as well as liturgical Jewish works. He taught George Gershwin and was a friend of Yossele Rosenblatt. His daughter, Estelle Brody, was an actress.

== Early life ==
Brody was born on March 12, 1877, according to his gravestone, in Lyakhavichy, Minsk Governorate, in the Russian Empire, although the Lexicon of Yiddish Theatre gives the date as February 12, and in own his naturalization application he stated his birthday was January 22, 1876. His father, Harris Brody, was a tailor and sent Joseph to a Cheder for his early education.

His father emigrated to the United States in 1887, at which point Joseph entered a Yeshiva in Slonim, where he stayed for six years. During that time he developed an aptitude for music, and was greatly impressed by the military orchestras which regularly played in the park in Slonim during the summers.

After being noticed by cantors who visited the Yeshiva in Slonim, he decided to drop out and followed cantor Moshe Bass to Białystok, where he became a choirboy. It was there that he learned music theory and studied Hebrew and Russian. Upon losing his Soprano voice, he began to compose cantorial compositions, and was hired by Cantor Kahane in Vilnius as a choir conductor, and after that under cantor Yoel Zelig in Pinsk.

To avoid being his conscription into the Russian military, his father sent for him and he travelled to the United States in 1895 via Hamburg, or possibly in 1896. He worked for a time as a conductor in synagogues and in the Yiddish theatre in Philadelphia.

== Composing career ==
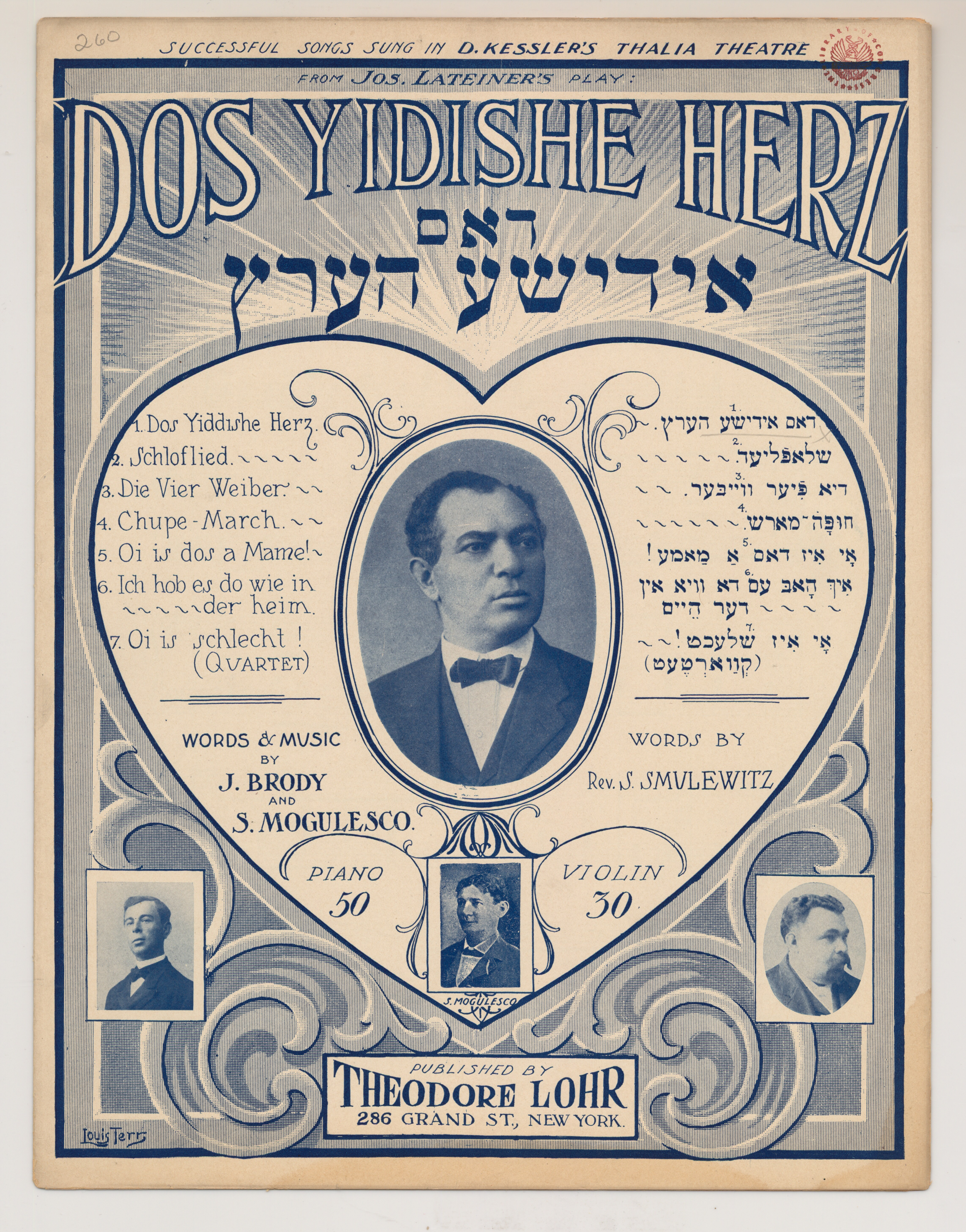
Cover page for Dos Yidishe Herz score, 1908

It was around the turn of the century that Brody's composing career in the United States began to see some success. Although he had worked at Morris Finkel's Yiddish theatre at the Arch Street Theatre in Philadelphia, that theatre merely staged New York plays and so his position was limited to conducting rather than composing. It was when he was hired by David Kessler from the Thalia Theatre in New York City that his career as a Jewish American composer began in earnest. His partnership with Kessler would last for several decades.

Kessler, Bertha Kalich, and Sigmund Mogulesko starred in Brody's debut play, which garnered significant success. During this time he developed an appreciation for Louis Friedsell's career, with whom he would later widely collaborate. He continued to work Yiddish folk melodies and Jewish religious music into his theatre compositions. Among his other contemporaries in the New York Yiddish Theatre world were Rubin Doctor, Arnold Perlmutter, Herman Wohl, Louis Gilrod, and many others. Joseph Rumshinsky published arrangements of a number of Brody's compositions during this era as well.

In 1913, Brody became a naturalized citizen of the United States. In the 1910s, Brody briefly instructed George Gershwin in composition, focusing on counterpoint, and directed a choir that Gershwin sang in.

After two decades of successful collaborations, Kessler died in 1920, after which Brody spent several shorter stints composing in other theatres, including the People's Theater, the Liberty Theater and the Hopkinson Theater. During his career he composed music for more than sixty plays.

While some sources indicate Brody's death in 1943, records confirm his passing on August 16, 1937.

== Family ==
Joseph married his first wife Elizabeth (Leah) Vishniff, a fellow Russian Jewish immigrant, in May 1898. In 1900 their first daughter Estelle Brody, then known as Sadie, was born. She would later become a well-known silent film actor in Great Britain. Their second and third children, Phillip and Harris, were born in 1902 and 1905. Their son Murray L. Brody, who would later become a composer as well, was born in 1909. Elizabeth died in May 1912 at age 36.

In December 1912, Joseph married his second wife, Bessie Fox, also a Russian Jewish immigrant. Census records indicate that they resided with Sadie, Philip, Harry, and Moses, in addition to their own children Bernard and Jannette (born 1914 and 1917 respectively).

== Selected plays Brody contributed music for ==
- Di sheyne Miriam by Jacob Gordin, music cowritten with Sigmund Mogulesko, 1900.
- Dos yoydel, oder di nakhtigal in Yerushalayim (The Nightingale in Jerusalem), operetta, written by Sigmund Feinman, lyrics by Brody, performed by Kalman Juvelier, 1903.
- Die Yuden in Brazilien (The Jews in Brazil) by Herman, 1903.
- Di grineh (The naive one) by Nahum Meir Schaikewitz, lyrics by Brody, performed by Bertha Kalich, 1903.
- Gott, mensh un toyfel, oder der Yiddisher Faust, performed by Bertha Kalich and David Kessler, 1903.
- Keynig fun di shnorers (King of the beggars), written by Israel Zangwill with lyrics by Solomon Smulewitz, 1905.
- Uptown and downtown, with lyrics by Solomon Smulewitz, 1906.
- Malke Shvo (Queen of Sheba), operetta, written by Moses Horowitz with lyrics by Anshel Schorr, 1907.
- Di sh'kheynim (The neighbors), with lyrics by Anshel Schorr, 1908.
- Di sheyne trim by Jacob Gordin
- Safo by Jacob Gordin
- Dos Yidishe Herz (The Jewish Heart), operetta, written by Joseph Lateiner, music cowritten with Sigmund Mogulesko with lyrics by Louis Gilrod, Solomon Smulewitz and Sigmund Mogulesko, 1908.
- Yom hakhupeh (The Wedding Day), operetta, music cowritten with Louis Friedsell, lyrics by Solomon Smulewitz and Louis Friedsell, 1910.
- Sholem bayis (The house of peace or "Home, sweet home"), written by Joseph Lateiner, music cowritten with Louis Friedsell with lyrics by Solomon Smulewitz, Joseph Tanzman and Isidore Lillian, 1910.
- Der falshe shrit (The false step), written by Joseph Lateiner, music cowritten with Louis Friedsell, lyrics by Henry M. Gastwirth, performed by Kalman Juvelier, 1915.
- Der Yiddish Koenig Lear (The Yiddish King Lear), written by Jacob Gordin, 1915.
- Der troyer fraynd (The True Friend) written by Joseph Lateiner with lyrics by Isidore Lillian, 1917.
- A khaver in leyben (A friend in life), operetta, written by Shloime Steinberg, with lyrics by B. Reznik, 1918.
- A mames neshumeh (A mother's soul), with lyrics by Joseph Tanzman
- Dos land fund trehren (The land of tears), operetta, with lyrics by David Meyerowitz, 1920.
- Yankeleh tsigayner (Jacob, the gypsy), musical, with lyrics by Joseph Tanzman, 1926.
- Der Yiddish Koenig Lear (The Yiddish King Lear), film adaptation of Gordin play, 1934.
