= Isidore Lillian =

Yiddish American actor, songwriter and playwright

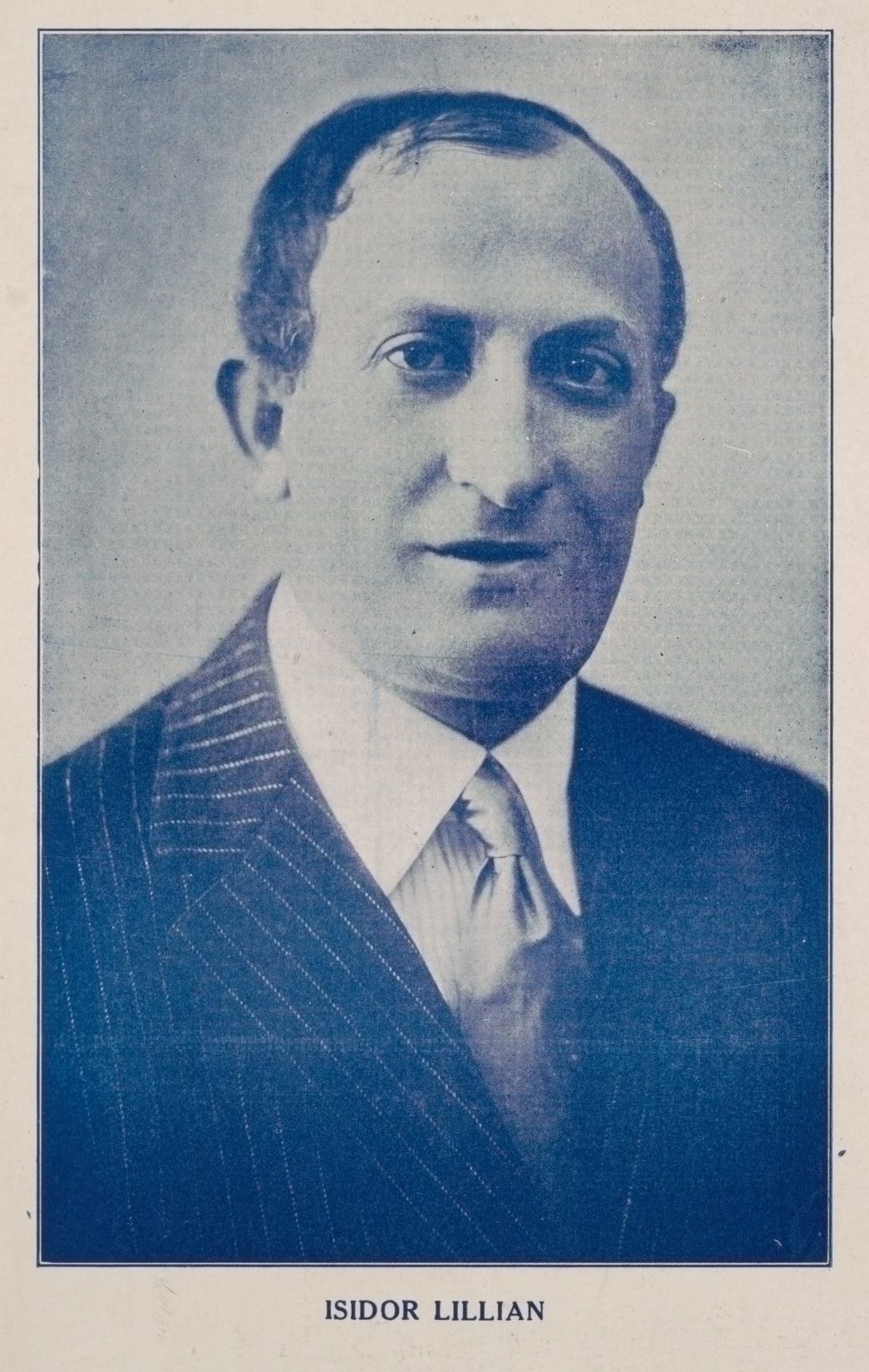
Isidore Lillian, Yiddish songwriter and playwright, c. 1918

Isidore Lillian (Yiddish: איזידאָר ליליען Izidor Lilien, c. 1882–1960) was an actor, songwriter, playwright, and composer who was a leading figure in the New York Yiddish Theatre for the first half of the twentieth century. He wrote hundreds of songs for the theatre which were performed by such actors as Boris Thomashefsky, David Kessler, and Jacob Adler, as well as by Lillian himself.

== Biography ==
=== Early life ===
Isidore Lillian was born into a poor family in Rzeszów, Galicia, Austria-Hungary in the early 1880s. His exact birthdate is unclear; on many government documents he said September 14, 1883 but the Lexicon of Yiddish Theatre and other documents give the date as September 7, 1882. He emigrated to the United States in March, 1892 apparently with his mother and sister. In New York, he soon became interested in the Yiddish Theatre and joined it very young, becoming a member of the Dramatist Union at 16 and joining a Vaudeville troupe by age 17. In that troupe, he wrote and performed his own sketches and songs. A popular genre for Lillian and others of his cohort, such as Solomon Smulewitz and Louis Gilrod, was to write Yiddish-language parodies of popular American songs of the day.

=== Music and theatre career ===
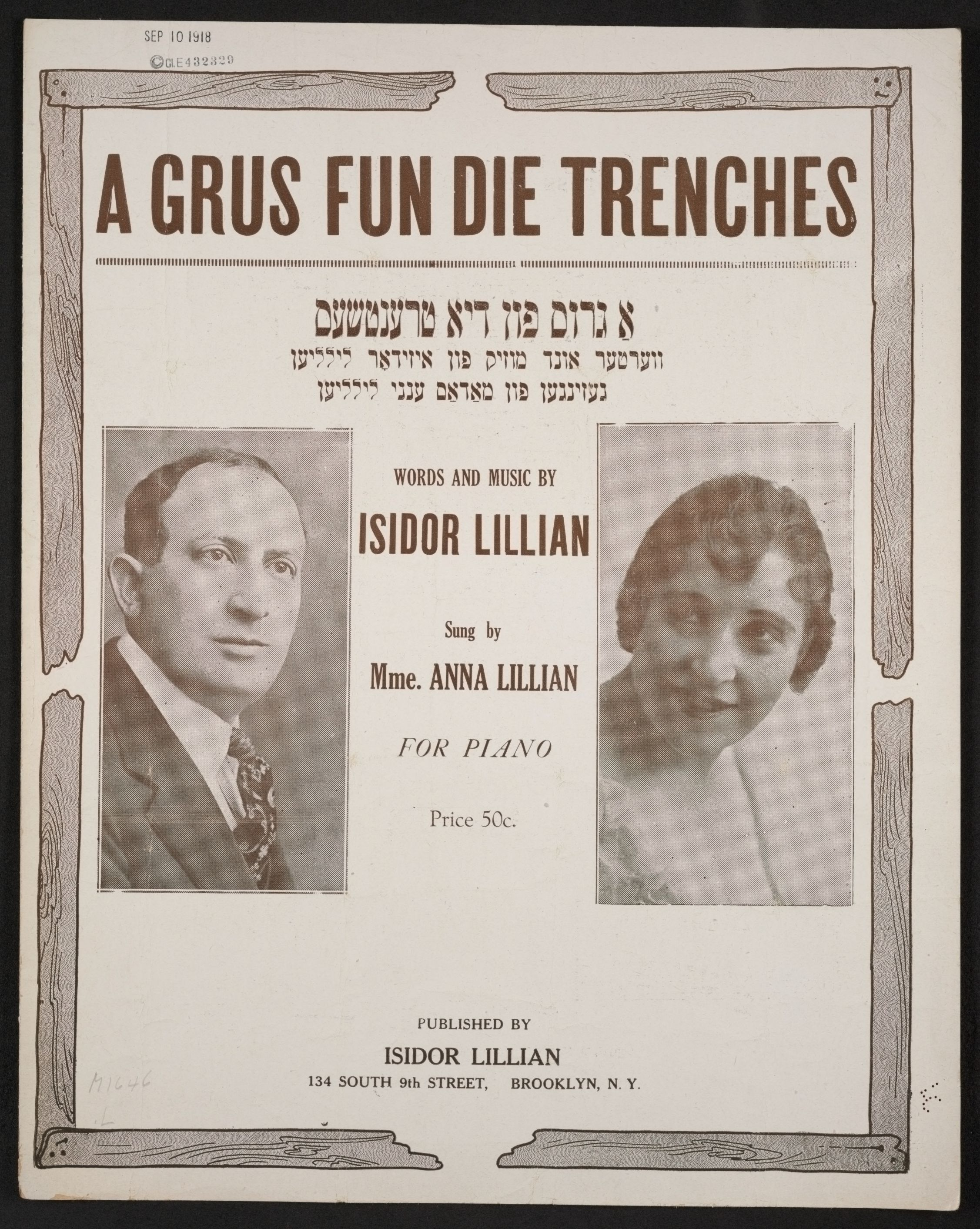
Cover of Score for A Grus fun die Trenches, 1918

Lillian started to write full-length plays, and lyrics for other plays and operettas in the Yiddish theatre starting in 1905. Thereafter he wrote plays and song lyrics continuously for several decades.

In 1911 he took over management of the Union Theatre where he planned to stage his own productions with his wife Annie Black and his collaborator Alex Cohn. His lyrical contributions to Isidore Solotarefsky's Yesoymim fun der velt (Orphans of the World) in 1916 were regarded as some of the best work of his career, even decades later. Then in 1923 he took over management of the Lyric Theatre in Williamsburg (not to be confused with the Lyric Theatre in Manhattan) which he eventually renamed Lillian's Lyric Theatre. As Vaudeville went out of fashion, by 1926 it was considered the only Yiddish Vaudeville theatre in New York.

In the early 1930s Lillian attempted to move from theatre to Yiddish film. He wrote 1930's My Yiddishe Momme by Judea Pictures, directed by Sidney Goldin. In the summer of 1931 he was being announced as the director of Judea Pictures' first "Yiddish talker". However, it is unclear whether that refers to My Yiddishe Momme or another film that was never finished, nor does he seem to have continued to work in film.

After the end of the Second World War, Lillian's career became very closely tied to that of actor Menasha Skulnik. The men collaborated on a number of musicals and musical comedies to great success, and when Skulnik left the Yiddish Theatre to pursue an English-language career in the 1950s, Lillian's lost much of his steady income.

In his old age, Lillian became blind and lived in the New York Guild for the Jewish Blind where he encountered Louis Kramer, an old Yiddish Theatre colleague of his, who also lived there. The two men sometimes staged 1-act plays or scenes in the home and were planning to do more when Lillian died unexpectedly on August 27, 1960, at age 78. He was buried in the Mount Hebron Cemetery.

=== Family ===
Isidore married his wife Annie (née Black), born in Minsk, Russian Empire, in December 1906. The union appears to have been childless. They were divorced by 1930.

== Selected plays ==
- Lyricist for Der griner bokhur (1905), with music by Louis Friedsell
- Lyricist for Der Yiddisher Yankee Doodle (1905), with music by Louis Friedsell.
- Lyricist for Khantshe in Amerika (1913), Operetta, with music by Joseph Rumshinsky and libretto by Nahum Rackow. Performed by Sam Kasten.
- Co-lyricist with Boris Thomashefsky for Tsubrokeneh fideleh (1916), Operetta, with music by Joseph Rumshinsky and libretto by Boris Thomashefsky.
- Lyricist for Der troyer fraynd (1917), with music by Joseph Brody and libretto by Joseph Lateiner and David Kessler.
- Co-lyricist with Louis Gilrod for Yente Telebende (1917), musical, with music by Joseph Rumshinsky and libretto by B. Kovner.
- Lyricist for Yesoymim fun der velt (1916), with music by Peretz Sandler and libretto by Isidore Solotarefsky.* Co-lyricist with Boris Thomashefsky for Di khazinte (1918), operetta with music by Joseph Rumshinsky and libretto by Boris Thomashefsky.
- Lyricist for Gelebt un gelacht (1918), operetta, with music by Herman Wohl and libretto by Morris Goldberg. Performed by David Kessler.
- Der rebbe hot geheysen freylakh zayn (1922), with music by Joseph Rumshinsky.
- Keytun fun libeh (1923) music, lyrics and libretto by Isidore Lillian.
- Co-lyricist with Joseph Tanzman for Sholem bays (1923), with music by Joseph Brody and libretto by Joseph Lateiner.
- Lyricist for Freylakh zol zayn (1924), with music by Sholom Secunda and libretto by William Siegel.
- Co-lyricist with Molly Picon for Dos Radio girl (1929), musical, with music by Joseph Rumshinsky and libretto by Louis Freiman. Performed at the Kessler theatre by Molly Picon.
- Lyricist for Ziseh momenten (1930), with music by Sholom Secunda and libretto by Louis Freiman and William Siegel.
- The Trombinick (1930), with lyrics by Jacob Jacobs and music by Abe Ellstein. Performed by Ludwig Satz.
- Lyricist for Der kleyne rebbeleh (1935), musical, with music by Philip Laskowsky and libretto by Anshel Schorr.
- Lyricist for A sheyner kholem (1936), musical, with music by Sholom Secunda and libretto by William Siegel.
- Lyricist for Fishel, der gerotener (1936), with music by Joseph Rumshinsky and libretto by Louis Freiman.
- Lyricist for Der freylikher shtetl (1937), musical, with music by Joseph Rumshinsky and libretto by Isidore Friedman and Israel Rosenberg.
- Lyricist for Yosel un zayn vayber (1937), musical, with music by Joseph Rumshinsky and libretto by Louis Freiman.
- Lyricist for Mazel tov rebbe (1938), musical, with music by Joseph Rumshinsky and libretto by Anshel Schorr.
- Lyricist for Der galitsianer rebbe (1938), musical, with music by Joseph Rumshinsky and libretto by Israel Rosenberg.
- Yosel, der klezmer (1941) with music by Alexander Olshanetsky, libretto co-written by Lillian and Olshanetsky.
- Lyricist for Kinder ohn a heym (1943), with music by Ilia Trilling and libretto by Louis Freiman.
- Lyricist for Lucky Days (1943), musical, with music by Sholem Secunda, libretto by William Siegel.
- Lyricist for Mayn fraynd Yosel (1944), with music by Sholom Secunda, author of libretto unknown.
- Lyricist for Good News (1944), musical, with music by Joseph Rumshinsky, librettist unknown.
- Bessarabia (1946), musical comedy revue, with music by Manny Fleishman, performed by Herman Yablokoff.
- Co-lyricist with Jacob Jacobs for Wish Me Luck (1946), musical, with music by Abe Ellstein, and libretto by Isidore Friedman and Israel Rosenberg. Performed by Menasha Skulnik and Miriam Kressyn.
- Co-lyricist with Jacob Jacobs for My Wedding Night (1946), musical comedy, music by Abe Ellstein and libretto by Isidore Friedman. Performed by Menasha Skulnik.
- Co-lyricist with Jacob Jacobs for Just My Luck (1947), musical, with music by Abe Ellstein and libretto by William Siegel.
- Co-lyricist with Jacob Jacobs for The Baby Sitter (1948), musical comedy, music by Abe Ellstein and libretto by William Siegel.
- Co-lyricist with Jacob Jacobs for Lakh un zay freylakh (1950), musical, with music by Sholom Secunda and libretto by Louis Freiman.
