= Kalman Juvelier =

Austrian-born Yiddish theatre actor, manager, and recording artist

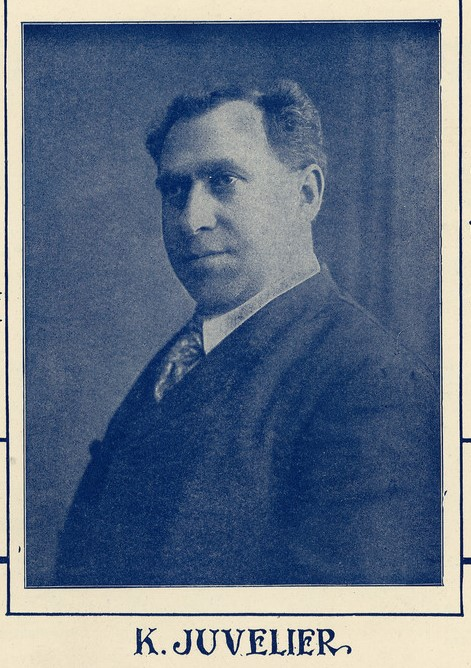
Kalman Juvelier, circa 1906

Kalman Juvelier (Yiddish: קלמן יאָװעליר, 1863-1939) was an Austrian-born Yiddish theatre actor and manager, Broder singer, Tenor, and recording artist of the late nineteenth and early twentieth centuries, who was active both in Europe and the United States. After emigrating to the United States in 1900, he became a key figure in the Yiddish theatre in New York, working with such notables as Boris Thomashefsky, David Kessler, Bertha Kalich and Jacob P. Adler and was director of the Hebrew Actor's Union as well as the Jewish Theatrical Alliance. From roughly 1905 to 1918, he recorded roughly 90 Yiddish language discs, mostly Yiddish theatre music, for most of the major record labels in the New York area.

== Biography ==
=== Early life ===
Juvelier was born in Lemberg, Galicia, Austria-Hungary (today Lviv, Ukraine) on May 12, 1863. He was born into a poor family; his parents were Isaiah Juvelier and Yetta (née Berger). He trained as a choir singer under Cantor Baruch Shor at age 9, and then with Cantor Aharon-Sholem Shirman.

=== European theatre career ===
By his teen years, Juvelier had left Lemberg and began to travel as an itinerant folk singer. He fell in with the Broder singer group, and toured Galicia, Romania and Bukovina with them, including with Velvel Zbarjer, but also with lesser-known figures such as Adolf Shrage, Efrim Broder, and Henech Linetsky. Their first properly "theatrical" performance took place in Cernauti in a production of Shmendrik. The troupe then heard that there was a Yiddish theatre production being prepared in Botoșani, and Juvelier left the troupe with Mendele Rotman, and they joined the Itzik-Mendel Bergman troupe. For a time he acted in Gimpel's Theatre in Lviv under Goldfaden's direction. In 1880 he returned to Cernauti and joined Moses Horowitz's troupe. While working as an actor there he met his first wife, Yetta Rauch, who was the prima donna of the troupe. Kalman soon took over direction of the troupe and they spent the next two decades touring, performing operettas and plays by Avram Goldfaden, Jacob Gordin, Joseph Lateiner and others in Bukovina, Galicia, the Romania, Egypt, and the Ottoman Empire.

In the 1890s his troupe continued to tour successfully and featured such actors as Bertha Kalich, Yekutiel "Edward" Margules, and Malbina Treitler, as well as a whole generation of younger Yiddish actors. Herman Wohl, who would later become a well-known composer of Yiddish music in the United States, also wrote for Juvelier's troupe during this time, as did the Hazzan and Yiddish songwriter Zeydl Helman. In some cases, Juvelier's troupe performed "bootleg" versions of Goldfaden plays, as in 1895 in Iași where he was able to find someone who had seen and memorized most of The Sacrifice of Isaac and could write it down for Juvelier. Goldfaden found out and attempted to sue Juvelier, but lost because the play was based on a Biblical story. His performance of a Yiddish adaptation of The Gypsy Baron was particularly successful, with Kalish coming to the attention of elite circles in Bucharest after its performance there.

=== United States ===
In 1899 or 1900 Juvelier emigrated to New York City along with his entire troupe, sailing from Hamburg. Among those who accompanied him for the journey were his entire family, and so many leading members of his troupe that it caused complaints from the Jewish actor's union in New York. In fact, he had been recruited to be a star at the Windsor Theatre, on behalf of his old troupe-leader Professor Horowitz; he ended up working there for five years. He soon become one of the most well-known leading men in the New York Yiddish theatre. He also managed to turn his fame on stage into a fairly extensive recording career, making him a contemporary of such early Yiddish recording artists as Solomon Smulewitz, Frank Seiden and Simon Paskal. His earliest may have been in 1904 when he made a number of recordings for the short-lived United Hebrew Disc and Cylinder Company, including some with Regina Prager. He became a Naturalized citizen in 1906. And by 1907 he was making recordings from Yiddish musicals and operettas by such composers as Goldfaden, Louis Friedsell, and Herman Wohl for Edison Records. By 1910 he had moved on to recording for Zonophone Records, and Columbia Records in 1912.

In the early 1910s he worked at the Liberty Theatre with Boris Thomashefsky, until 1913 when he left on a tour of Argentina. In 1913 and again in 1915 he re-entered the studio with the Victor Recording Company in New York, recording a number of solo tracks and some with Fannie Lubritsky. His troupe with Yiddish theatre actress Regina Prager (the Prager-Juvelier Operetta Company), which had been founded sometime before 1907, embarked on a number of successful tours around the United States during the 1910s. During that time he returned to Columbia and Victor Records again several times, recording a long list of tracks for them during and after World War I.

From 1921 to 1928, he worked in the Arch Street Theatre in Philadelphia, and then returned to New York to work at the Second Avenue Theatre and others for a few short stints in the early 1930s. He retired from the stage in around 1935.

He died at age 76, on December 15, 1939 in Brooklyn, New York.

== Family ==
Kalman's children were mostly born in Europe with his first wife Yetta Rauch. She died in New York in 1908. Their children were Clara (born 1886), Max (born 1893), and Jennie (Bella, born 1904 in New York), who started off in the Yiddish and English theatre and later became a radio actor. He married his second wife Bina Abramovitz in 1910, a Russian-born Yiddish theatre actress.
