= Philip Laskowsky =

Polish-born American composer, comedian, and actor

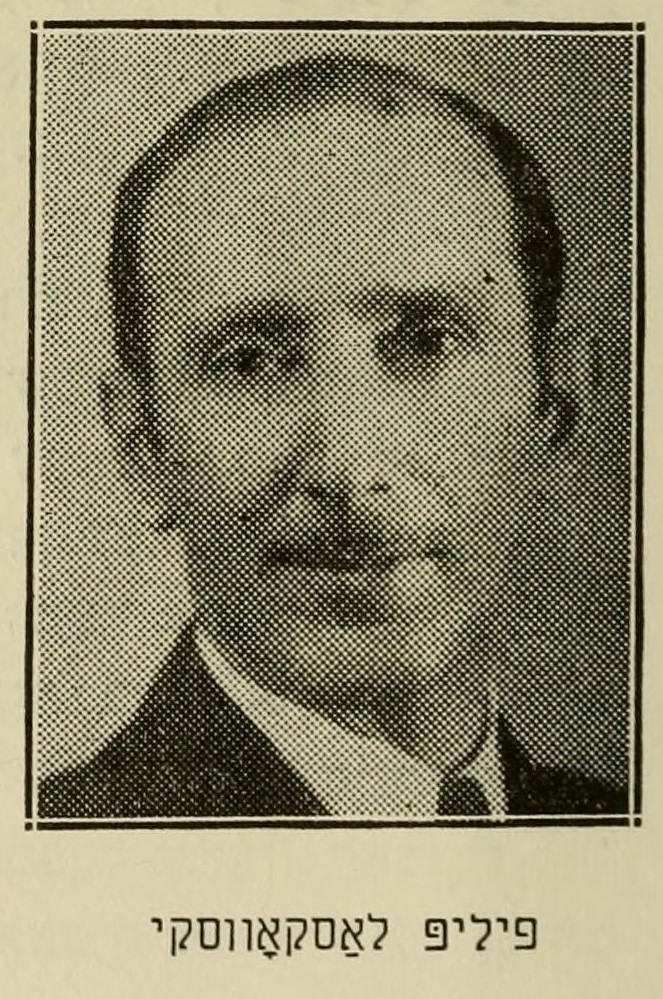
Philip Laskowsky

Philip Laskowsky (Yiddish: פֿיליפּ לאַסקאָװסקי; c.1884–1960) was a Polish-born American composer, arranger, bandleader, comedian and actor of the Yiddish theatre. He collaborated with a number of well-known figures of the American Yiddish theatre such as Boris Thomashefsky, Louis Gilrod, Isidore Lillian, Jacob Jacobs, and Rubin Doctor. He is sometimes credited with having written the music for the well-known Yiddish song Oyfn veg shteyt a boym, although this is disputed.

== Biography ==
=== Early life ===
He was born Pinchas Laskowsky in Warsaw, Poland in the 1880s. His exact year of birth is uncertain; the Leksikon fun yidishn teater gives it as July 17, 1889, but in immigration documents Laskowsky usually indicated July 17, 1884 or sometimes 1886. His father was a lumber merchant and follower of the Radzymin Hasids. As a youth he was taught by Melameds and his father, and learned music from a Hazzan as well as from his brother, who was a music professor. His brother wanted to prepare him for the career of being a military bandleader.

=== Theatre career ===
However, rather than the military he was apprenticed in the opera company "Bustnai" in Warsaw. He soon became the second choir conductor with them. He also befriended Yiddish Theatre actor named Strasfogel and started to act in small productions with him. He then acted in traveling Yiddish theatre troupes in Poland and the Russian Empire until the outbreak of World War I. When Germany occupied Warsaw a central theatre was organized and he played as a character actor in operettas there. He also began to compose music for operettas at around this time. He married his wife Sarah around the end of the war, and they had their daughter Chaia in July 1919.

He left Poland in 1921 and emigrated to the United States, sailing first to Halifax, Canada, then to Montreal and arrived in New York City in March. There he continued to act and compose short works for the Yiddish theatre, often for productions by Boris Tomashevsky. He held a number of jobs in smaller Yiddish theatres during the 1920s, often following Tomashevsky to other cities, including in Los Angeles in 1925 and in Philadelphia in 1927.

It was in 1929 that he got his first high-profile job writing full compositions, becoming the director, conductor and composer at the Prospect Theatre with Nathan Goldberg and Jacob Jacobs. That same year, on March 4, 1929, Goldberg, Laskowsky and actor Lucy Finkel were involved in an automobile accident, leaving Finkel with a fractured skull and Laskowsky with a broken spine. According to Pesach Burstein, Laskowsky spent several months recovering in bed from the injuries.

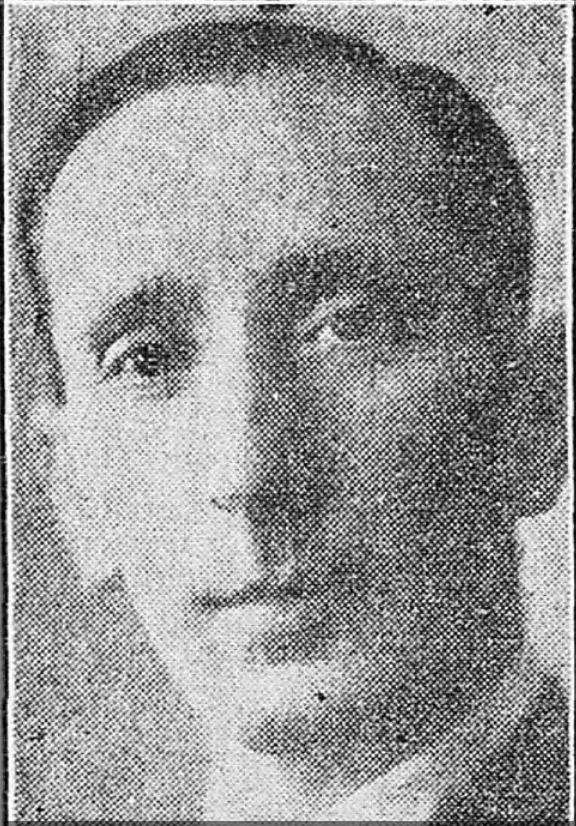
Philip Laskowsky

In the 1930s Laskowsky continued to be very productive in the Yiddish theatre, not only composing but also arranging the compositions of other composers for performance. In 1930 and 1931 he worked for the Hopkinson Theatre and also worked for a time in Winnipeg, Canada. In 1931 he returned to the United States to work at the Arch Street Theatre in Philadelphia. He then returned to New York in 1932 and worked at the Liberty Theatre in Brooklyn.

During and after World War II, as the Yiddish theatre waned in popularity, he collaborated regularly with Israel Rosenberg and Vera Rozanka. His only contribution to film music seems to have been a partial credit for Catskill Honeymoon, a low-budget 1950 film directed by Josef Berne.

He died in New York on June 13, 1960. He was buried at Mount Hebron Cemetery in the Yiddish Theatrical Alliance section.

== Selected list of plays and operettas he wrote music for ==
- Der griner melamed
- Di griner kuzine (1922, written by Boris Thomashefsky)
- Di khasene in Rumenien (1924)
- Di bar mitzvah (1927, written by Boris Thomashefsky)
- Khad gadya (1927, written by Boris Thomashefsky)
- In rabins hoyf by Nestor
- Der konig fun gamblers (1928, written by Meir Schwartz)
- Dayn mames gelibter (1928, by H. Kalmanovitsh)
- Avrahamale melamed
- Farlangt a khosn (by Samuel H. Kohn)
- Di kenigin fun meyn harts (1929, written by William Siegel and lyrics by Louis Gilrod)
- Der kleiner bondit (1933, written by Samuel Steinberg)
- Der kleyne rebele (1935, written by Anshel Schorr)
- Farblondzhete mener (1951, written by Israel Rosenberg)
- Gezang fun libe (Song of Love, 1951, written by Israel Rosenberg)
- Hintern farlang fun lebn (1951, written by Israel Rosenberg)
- Yosef mit zayne brider (1955, written by Israel Rosenberg)
