= Henry Lynn =

American screenwriter

- Production: Power of Life, NYC, 1939
- Born: July 21, 1895; Białystok, Congress Poland
- Died: August 25, 1984 (aged 89); Miami Beach, Florida
- Occupation: Producer/Director/Writer
- Spouse: Kitty Cooperman

Henry Lynn (July 21, 1895 – August 25, 1984) was a film director, screenwriter, and producer, who concentrated on Yiddish life and culture in the United States in the years 1932–1939, the era of Yiddish film in America. Lynn was an innovator in sound technology, frequently commissioned original music, and he used popular radio and opera stars Boris Thomashefsky, Esther Field, and Seymour Rexite, as well as New York stage actors like Celia Adler.

== Biography ==
Lynn was born in the region of Białystok, then Russian Empire, now in Poland. Frustrated by difficulties of obtaining an education in Białystok, he emigrated to America, arriving in Boston in 1914. Initially, he taught languages in Boston and suburbs, Dorchester, Lynn, and Revere. Later he moved to New York City where he taught Hebrew and Russian, then became a film producer/director/writer, 1932–1939. During WWII Lynn created a business to manufacture plastic products for the war effort, and he was a news commentator on radio station, WEVD. Henry Lynn is survived by his daughter, Lila Lynn, who appeared as a child actress in his 1938 film, The Power of Life. Lynn's wife, Kitty Cooperman, also appeared in The Power of Life.

== Career ==
From 1932 to 1939, Lynn was writer and/or producer/director of at least 10 films, emphasizing family life and the challenges to traditional values. He directed 9 films. The first two: The Intolerance of 1933 (1933), and The Youth of Russia (1934), are documentaries and contain rare footage of historical events, e.g., labor union marches in New York City in the early 1930s.

Lynn was an innovator, implementing Joseph Seiden's new sound technology in The Unfortunate Bride, his 1932 remake of silent film, Broken Hearts (1926). Lynn included Hebrew dubbing in Shir Hashirim by Tel Aviv exhibitor Ya'acov Davidon and produced some short films for theatrical shows. One example is Papirossen by radio star Herman Yablokoff. This theatrical play was based on a current hit song, Papirosn. Lynn's short 15-minute film featured Sidney Lumet, as an 11-year-old cigarette vendor. The play and short film were booked into the Bronx McKinley Square Theatre in 1935. This was one of Henry Lynn's most unusual productions.

Lynn and Joseph Green, a contemporary actor and film producer/director, collaborated and distributed Bar Mitzvah (1935) in Europe, notably Poland, where it was playing in 1937 in Warsaw with another film, Green Light with Errol Flynn. Boris Thomashefsky, a popular opera singer and actor at the time, was a co-producer and starred in the film. He sang in Lynn's film, as he had in the earlier 1924 play, Bar Mitzvah, a hit song, Erlekh Zayn (Being Virtuous). Despite the advent of "talkies" Lynn did not recognize the new technology and saw his film style disappear with the rise of Hollywood.

During World War II Lynn and Joseph Seiden suspended their film careers to assist the war effort. Lynn founded a small plastic products manufacturing company.

== Filmography ==
- Mothers of Today (1939) (aka Hayntige Mames)
- A People Eternal (1939)
- The Power of Life (1938) (aka Die Kraft von Leben)
- Where Is My Child? (1937) (aka Vu iz mayn Kind? (Yiddish title) or Wo ist mein Kind? (German title))
- The Holy Oath (1937) (aka Di Heylige Shvue)
- Shir Hashirim (1935) (aka Farbotene Liebe or Forbidden Love or Song of Songs or Verbotene Liebe (reissue title)
- Bar-Mitzvah (1935)
- The Youth of Russia (1934) (aka The Yiddish Father or Der Yiddisher Vater or Der Yidisher Foter)
- The Intolerance of 1933 (1933) Semi-documentary, owned by Emgee Films, Reseda, California
- The Unfortunate Bride (1932) (aka Die Ungluckliche Kale)

== Casting ==
Many of Lynn's films used popular theatre actors of the era: opera singer/actor, Boris Thomashefsky, actor and director, Sidney Lumet, Celia Adler, Morris Strassberg, Dora Weissman, actor/singer, Seymour Rechzeit, Michal Michalesko, and the popular radio star Esther Field. The production companies were Lynn Productions, Menorah, Empire Films, S & L Films, Sov-Am Films, Judea Films and Apex Films. Jack Stillman was the musical director of most of Lynn's films, several of which had excellent original compositions by Joseph Rumshinsky, Art Shryer, Ludwig Satz, and William Mercur. Original composition was featured in Shir Hashirim (Songs of Songs). Lynn made effective use of music to heighten the emotional drama of his films.

== Availability ==
The National Center for Jewish Film at Brandeis University and the Museum of Modern Art in New York City have copies of some of these films. DVD and VHS copies of Mothers of Today, Where is my Child and Bar Mitzvah are available from TCM, Brandeis, Ergo, and Israel-Store. The Intolerance of 1933 is available from Glenn Studio, EmGee Films, Reseda, California.

== Critical appraisal ==
Mothers of Today was reviewed in 1939 by Film Daily.

Shir Hashirim was reviewed in 1935 by The New York Times.
