= Jacob Solomon Olschwang =

- Born: Jacob Solomon Levin; 4 May 1840; Kokhanovo, Mogilev Governorate, Russian Empire
- Died: 17 January 1896 (aged 55); Yekaterinoslav, Yekaterinoslav Governorate, Russian Empire
- Writing career
- Pen name: Yashbiel (ישביא״ל)
- Language: Hebrew

Jacob Solomon Olschwang (Yiddish: יעקב שלמה אָלשװאַנג; 4 May 1840 – 17 January 1896), also known by the acronym Yashbiel (ישביא״ל), was a Russian writer and Hebraist.

== Biography ==
Jacob Solomon Levin was born to a notable Ḥasidic family in Kokhanovo, Mogilev, a descendant of David Conforte. He received a thorough Jewish education, and studied Talmud and Halakha, the Zohar and various other Kabbalistic works. He then went to Kovno, where he studied at the yeshiva of Navyazki. In 1862 he settled in Friedrichstadt, Courland, where he joined the circle of the Maskilim and in a short time was able to write Hebrew well. He changed his family name to Olschwang when he moved to Kremenchuk in 1866.

He contributed numerous articles to Ha-Melitz (from 1860), Ha-Shaḥar, Ha-Boḳer Or, and other Hebrew periodicals. Among Olschwang's writings are "Avot de-Kartina" (in Ha-Melitz, 1868) and "Haggadah shel Pesaḥ" (in Ha-Shaḥar, 1877), both satirical sketches of Jewish life in Russia.

Olschwang maintained a correspondence with most of the Russian Maskilim of his time, especially with Reifmann, Lillienblum, Zederbaum, Schulman, Dobsevage, and Rosenthal.
