= Shir Hashirim (film) =

1935 film

- Directed by: Henry Lynn
- Based on: Shir Hashirim by: Anshel Schorr; Joseph Rumshinsky
- Produced by: Henry Lynn
- Starring: Samuel Goldenberg
- Release date: 1935
- Country: United States
- Language: Yiddish

Shir Hashirim ("Song of Songs") is a 1935 lost Yiddish-language film.

== Cast ==
- Samuel Goldenberg
- Dora Weissman
- Anna Toback
- Mierele Gruber

== Production and release ==
The film is based on the Shir Hashirim ("Song of Songs") operetta by Joseph Rumshinsky and Anshel Schorr. The low-budget Yiddish talkie, directed by Henry Lynn, intersperses English-language titles with the spoken dialogue. It was the first of six Yiddish films Lynn had been signed by the Empire Film Company to make. Variety estimated that the film cost ten to fifteen thousand dollars to produce.

The film premiered in October 1935 and has since been lost. It showed at New York's Acme Theatre in Union Square. Variety reported that the Acme's run lasted four days.

== Reception ==
Variety's Wolfe Kaufman, after disparaging the whole of Yiddish film, wrote that the film's director was unworthy of the job.

== Bibliography ==
- Hoberman, J. (1991). Bridge of Light: Yiddish Film Between Two Worlds. Schocken Books. ISBN 978-0-8052-4107-5.
