= Zina Goldstein =

Yiddish theatre actress and singer

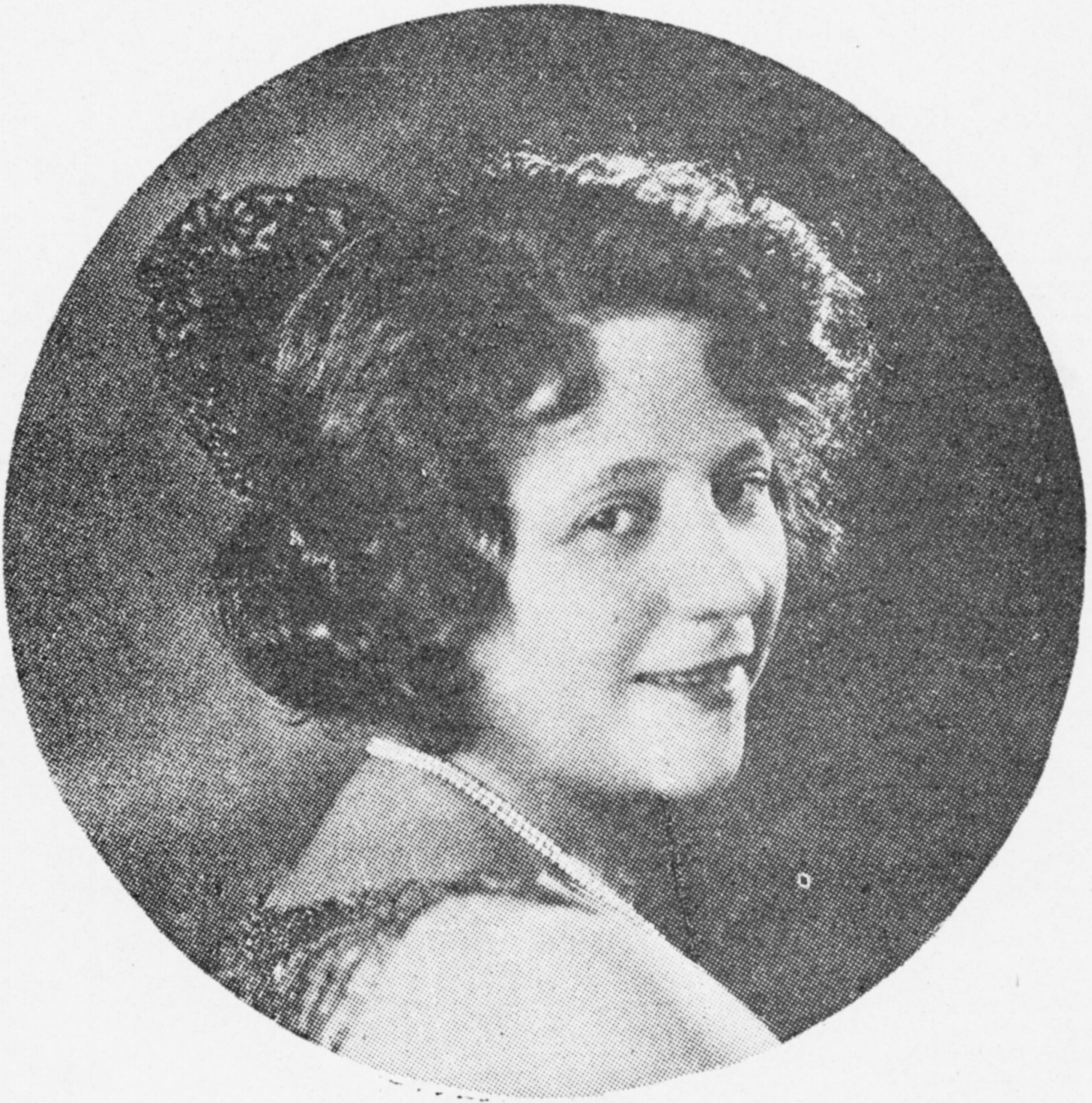
Zena Goldstein

Zina or Zena Goldstein (5 April 1892 – ) was a Yiddish theater actress and singer. She was born in Minsk, before moving to Warsaw. Her parents, who were also musical, supported her becoming a singer. She joined Aryeh Schlossberg's chorus and was given small roles. She became the prima donna in Abram Yitzhak Zandberg's Groys teater in Łódź, then worked in Rapel's troupe and for a short time in Kaminsky's. After the outbreak of the first world war, she became the primadonna in Łódź's Scala Theater, run by Julius Adler (b. 1880) and Herman Sierocki, where she played in a number of European operettas.

In 1920, she immigrated to New York, where she was hired by Boris Thomashevsky to star in Dos ungarishe meydl. She later co-directed the Liberty Theater with Roland and with Louis Goldberg, whom she married. In 1929–1930 she played at Max Gabel's Public Theater (under the name Zina Goldberg). In 1932, she made her debut at the Rolland Theatre in Brooklyn.

"The Public Theatre carries an able cast to supplement the work of Satz. In Zina Goldstein they have an actress that emanates life, and who possesses a voice of fine culture."

== Songs ==
- Vi Derlebt Men Shoyn Amerike Tsu Zeyn by Herman Wohl and Aaron Lebedeff
- Zog es mir nokh a mol (Say it to me again), lyrics by Jacob Jacobs, from Abraham Ellstein and Israel Rosenberg's operetta Der berditchever khosn (The Bridegroom from Berditchev) which starred Ludwig Satz and Zina Goldstein, opened the 1930–31 season at the Public Theatre (Second Avenue and 4th Street), New York
