= United Hebrew Disc and Cylinder Company =

Defunct American record label

The United Hebrew Disc and Cylinder Company, sometimes abbreviated as UHD&C, was an American record label who made about 150 records of only Jewish-Hebrew nature beginning in 1904 with last known recording taking place in 1906.

== History ==
UHD&C was formed by Pierre Long and managed by H.W. Perlman. It was incorporated in Brooklyn, New York in 1904 with a capitalization of $20,000. It was an outgrowth of Perlman's piano manufacturing business and operated out of the same building that built pianos. The recordings were dubbed from master cylinders to disc in a crude process that made for noisy, audibly inferior recordings. Discs by the United Hebrew Disc and Cylinder Company were pressed by at least two companies, the International Record Company and Leeds & Catlin. Most of UHD&C's promotional activity took place between January and November 1905. Facing intense competition from much larger companies for the Jewish record market and with an inferior product, UHD&C folded by the end of 1906. Nevertheless, the company holds its place in history as the first ethnically owned and operated producer of recorded sound in America.

== Output ==
United Hebrew Disc and Cylinder Company's first issued record was a recording pirated from The Gramophone Company. The output of UHD&C was strictly Hebrew and announced as such in a 1905 press release. Some of the Yiddish artists who recorded for this label include Louis Friedsell, Kalman Juvelier, Regina Prager, and Solomon Smulewitz. UHD&C announced an agreement to record Abraham Goldfaden, but no records were issued. It released the earliest known klezmer accordion recordings. The output of UHD&C has been largely documented in Ethnic Music on Records by Richard Spottswood, Greenwood Press (1990). Some record titles and catalog numbers :

Title	Artist	Cat Number
Rosinkes Mit Mandlen	Kalman Juvelier	1003
Ribone Scheil Ojlem	Cantor A. Minkowsky	1064

== See also ==
- List of record labels
