= Anshel Schorr =

American playwright (1871–1942)

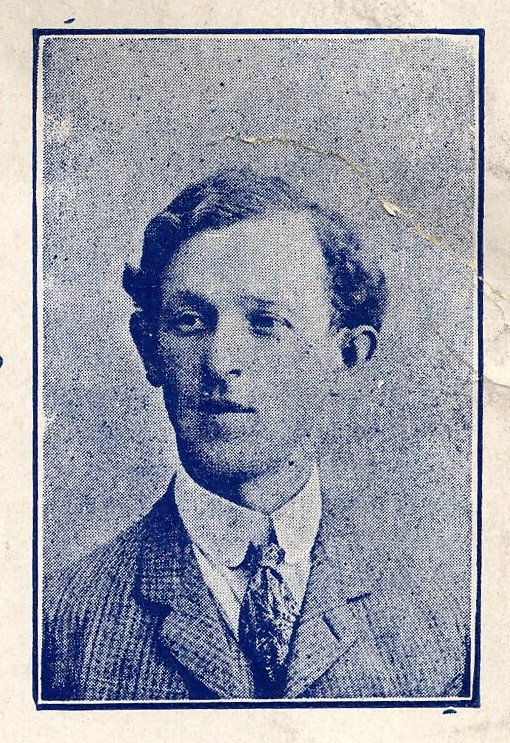
Anshel Schorr, Yiddish theatre lyricist c.1915

Anshel Schorr (Yiddish: אַנשל שור; October 25, 1871 – May 31, 1942), also known by the anglicized name Albert Schorr, was an Austrian-born American playwright, lyricist, theater manager and composer active in the Yiddish Theatre of the early twentieth century. He worked with many of the famous figures of that era including Joseph Rumshinsky, Arnold Perlmutter, Molly Picon, Jacob P. Adler, and David Kessler, and wrote or co-wrote more than fifty plays and operettas which were widely performed in Europe and the Americas. His songs were recorded by contemporary artists such as Pepi Litman, Pesach Burstein, Mordechai Hershman and Simon Paskal. His wife, Dora Weissman, was also a well-known Yiddish theatre actor.

== Biography ==
=== Early life ===
Anshel Schorr was born in Zolochiv, Galicia, Austria-Hungary on October 25, 1871. His father, Zallel Schorr, was a follower of Hasidic Judaism and a Melamed and his mother was named Rachel Perlmutter. The family relocated to Lviv when Anshel was 6 years old. He never had a secular education, learning in a Cheder and Yeshiva, although he learned Polish and German in a Beit midrash. His first employment was in the leather trade in his teen years, but in 1887 he first saw a Yiddish play and became enamoured by it. He would sneak out and attend Yiddish plays when he was supposed to be studying in the Beit midrash at night, and soon became acquainted with most of the actors in Lviv's Gimpel Theatre.

=== Theatre career ===
Schorr first made a name for himself in the Gimpel Theatre when he contributed lyrics to a song in Di lustike kavaliern (The Jolly Cavaliers). His own first play, which he wrote and acted in himself, was a Socialist play called The Oath to the Red Flag.

In 1890, Jacob P. Adler came to visit Lviv and took some of the Gimpel actors back to America with him, which gave Schorr the opportunity to be hired first as prompter, and then eventually in performing roles in the Gimpel theatre. After that, for a time, he left Lviv to tour Galicia, Bukovina, Bulgaria and Istanbul with a troupe.

After returning to Lviv, he attempted to go back to the leather trade, but it did not last long and he was soon touring Galicia and Romania with another troupe performing a new play about Alfred Dreyfus called Kapitan Dreyfus.

In 1900 Schorr emigrated to the United States, sailing from Hamburg to New York in August. He came with a troupe that had been invited to the Windsor Theater in Manhattan; he decided to stay and became assistant stage director there, and started writing lyrics for operettas.

In the early 1900s and 1910s his fame grew as he wrote for not only the Windsor but also the Thalia theater and others. In 1906 Jacob P. Adler gave Schorr acting, lyricist and director roles in Malke Shvo (Queen of Sheba), which greatly raised his profile. In 1908-09 he briefly managed the Metropolitan Theatre in Newark, New Jersey, and was stage director for Jacob P. Adler at the Thalia Theatre in 1910-11.

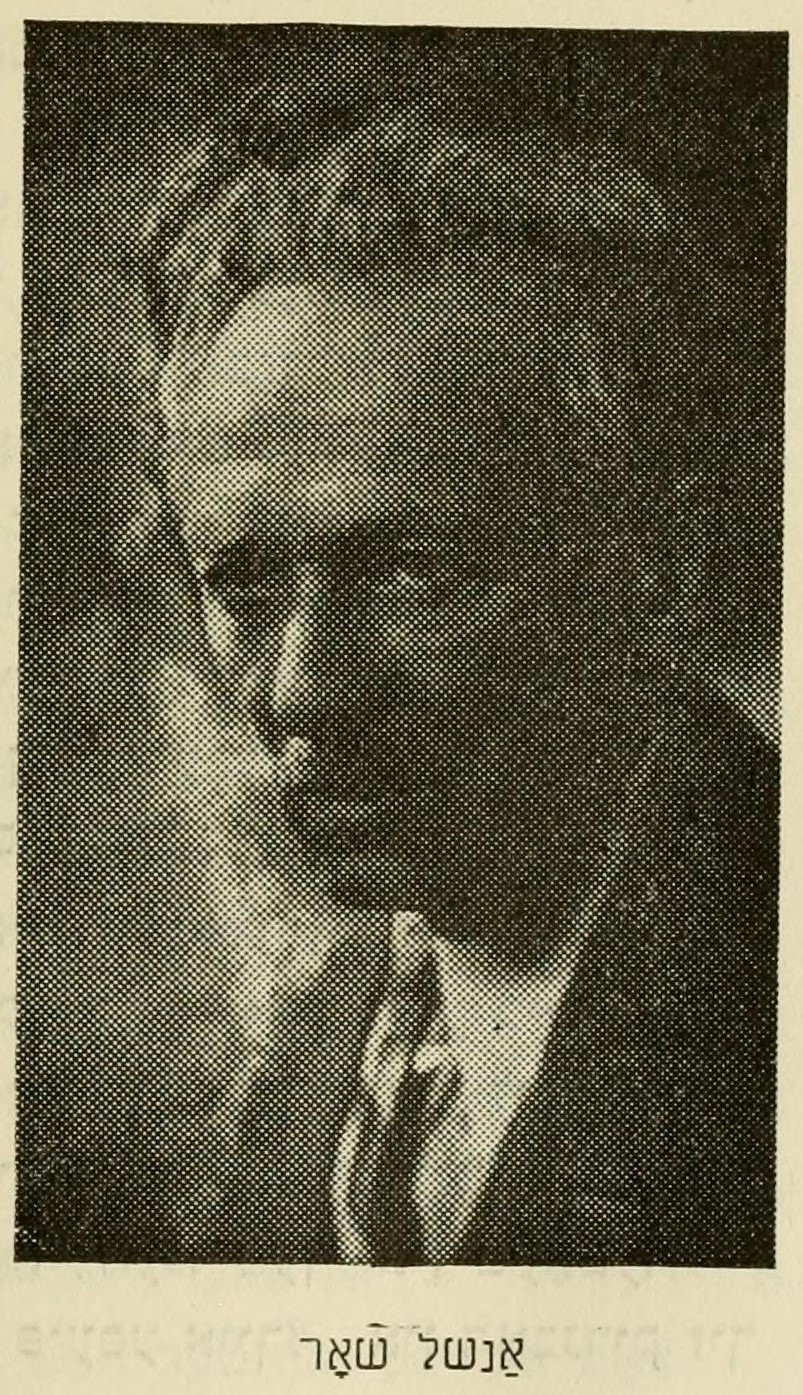
Anshel Schorr

During this era, outside of his work writing and staging plays, he also wrote some successful songs with Joseph Rumshinsky, including Mamenyu in 1911, an existing song which was adapted to commemorate the Triangle Shirtwaist Factory fire, and Litvak un galitsiyaner, a comedy duet.

In 1912, he became manager of his own theater, the newly-built Comedy Theater on Suffolk Street. However, it did not last long, and he soon relocated to Philadelphia, where he worked first for the Columbia Theatre, then the Franklin Theatre, and then finally to the Arch Street Theater, where he was managing director from 1912 to 1927. In 1913 one of his plays was staged in English for the first time, translated by Frances Corcoran. He continued to release his own plays at the Arch Street Theater, but when their success was not what he had hoped, he began a new phase of aggressively collaborating and co-writing with many other writers. However, according to his longtime collaborator Sholem Perlmutter, after 1919 he lost his "fire" and seemed demoralized about the state of his career and the Yiddish theatre more broadly.

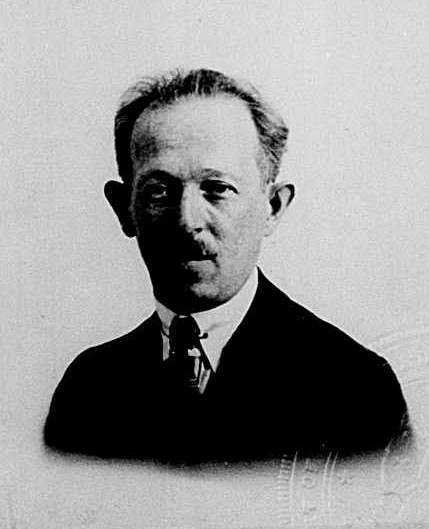
Anshel Schorr, Yiddish-language theatre lyricist and director, in 1921

It was in 1921 that he married Dora Weissman, a popular Yiddish actor. In 1927-28, he leased and managed his own theatre in Brooklyn called the Liberty Theatre, and when it closed he toured Europe from 1928-30. After managing the McKinley Square Theatre in 1931 he then toured South America for three years.

He died in Manhattan on May 31, 1942 at age 70. His papers and those of Dora Weissman are held by YIVO in New York City.

== Selected works ==
- Di lustike kavaliern (The Jolly Cavaliers) (c.1888, play, as lyricist)
- Kapitan Dreyfus (1894, play)
- Ben Hador (1900, operetta, as lyricist)
- Ben hamelekh (1904, opera) as lyricist, music by Arnold Perlmutter and Herman Wohl
- Der lodzhen president (1904, opera) as lyricist, with music by Perlmutter and Wohl
- A mentsh zol men zayn, oder Abraham Haskenazi (Be a Man, or, Abraham Haskenazi) (1908, operetta) as librettist and lyricist, with music by Perlmutter and Wohl
- Malke Shvo (Queen of Sheba) (1907, opera) as lyricist, with music by Joseph Brody
- Shir harishim (Song of songs) (1911, operetta) with music by Joseph Rumshinsky, staged by Morris Moscovitch, adapted as a film in 1935
- Dos zise meydl (The Sweet Girl) (1913, comedy) with music by Joseph Rumshinsky
- Dos naye rusland (The New Russia) (1917)
- Kinder, kumt aheym (Children, come home) (1919, operetta) as lyricist with music by Peretz Sandler
- Di Amerikaneh rebetsin (1922, musical) as lyricist, with music by Sholom Secunda
- Di kleyne rebbeleh (The little rabbi) (1935, musical) as librettist, with lyrics by Isidore Lillian and music by Philip Laskowsky
