= Anshel =

Anshel is a masculine given name, yiddish form of name Asher Notable people with the name include:

- Anshel Brusilow (1928–2018), American violinist, conductor and music educator
- Anshel Pfeffer (born 1973), British-Israeli journalist
- Anshel Schorr (1871–1942), Austrian-born American playwright, lyricist, theater manager and composer
