= Zeydl Shmuel-Yehuda Helman =

Romanian-Jewish journalist and playwright

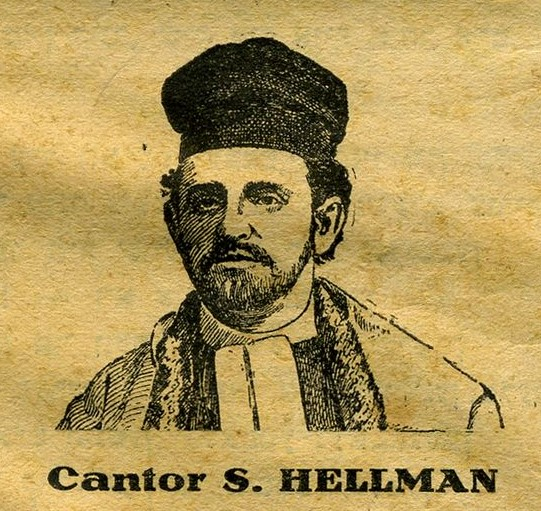
Cantor Hellman, 1920s

Zeydl Shmuel-Yehuda Helman (Yiddish: זײדל שמואל-יהודיה העלמאַן, c. 1855 – c. 1938), who often published under the pen name Hazman (הזמ״ן), was a Romanian Jewish actor, songwriter, journalist, and educator. In addition to working as an actor in the Yiddish theatre in Romania and in the United States, he wrote and published a large number of Yiddish theatre songs which were widely performed in the late nineteenth century, making him one of the earliest popular songwriters in the genre.

== Biography ==
Helman was born in Iași, Romania in 1855. His birth name was Shmuel-Yehuda, but he took on the name Zeydl after a childhood illness. His father had been a Hazzan but died when Helman was young. His mother remarried and his stepfather wanted him to become a shoichet (ritual slaughterer), but due to his interest in music he became a Hazzan and music teacher in Jewish schools instead. Around 1890, he became an actor in the Yiddish theatre and began to compose many songs which became popular in Romania. Among his better-known pieces were Yismekhu, Tsions tsvue, Gedenk zhe, yankl, and Ervakh, srolik; he also wrote Yiddish and Hebrew language poems. He also taught himself German and Romanian and sometimes translated works from those languages into Yiddish.

In 1893 Abba Sheyngold brought Helman to the United States to become a Yiddish theatre actor there under the name Helmanesko. He played a few seasons in New York City and Philadelphia, including at the Romanian Opera House with Jacob Adler and at Boris Thomashefsky's theater. However, he could not get used to life there and soon returned to Romania.

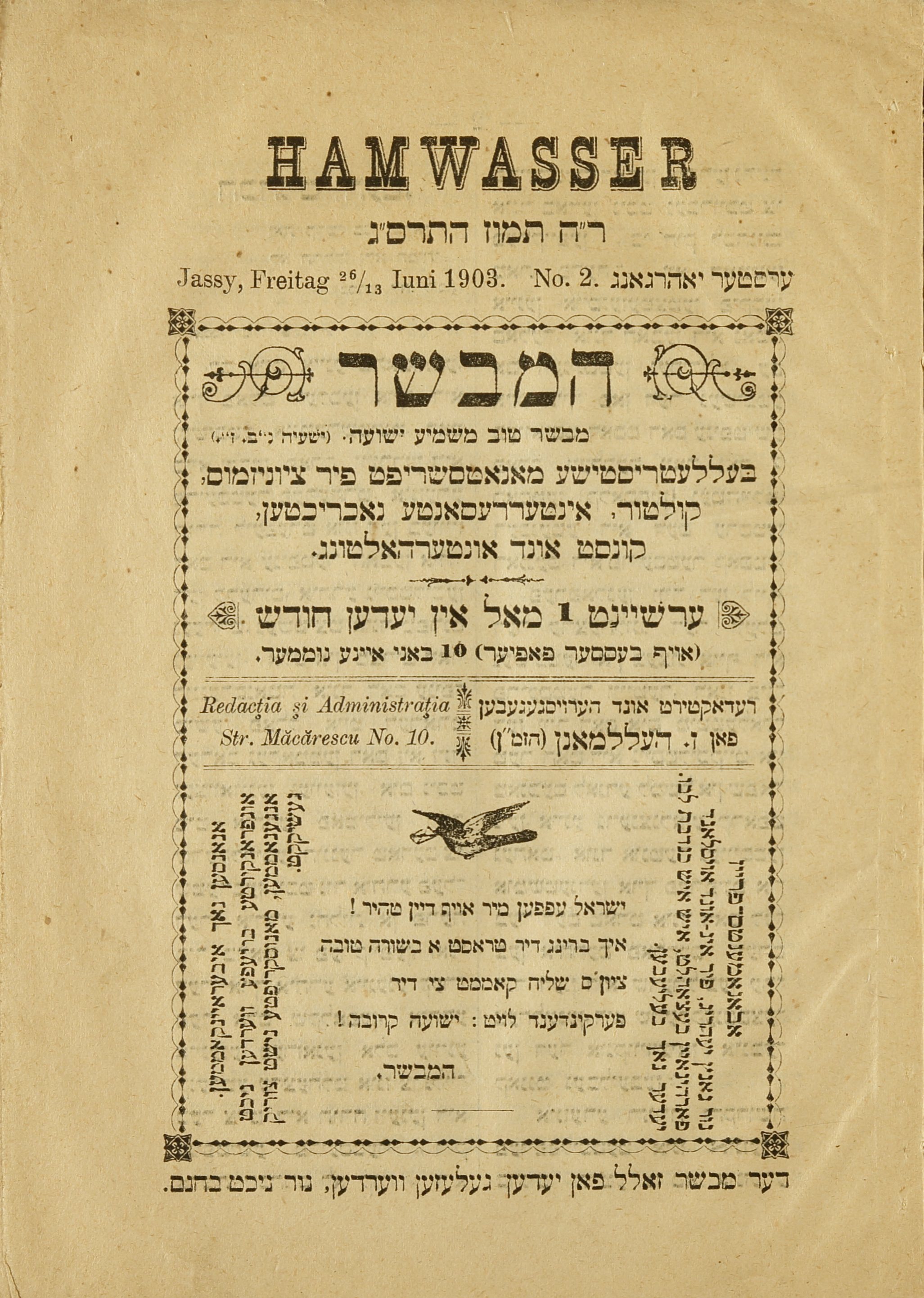
Cover page of Hamwasser (Iași, 1903)

Upon returning to Iași he became very involved in literary and theater life once again. He wrote a number of theatrical works: Bal shem (a play in five acts, staged in Iași with Kalman Juvelier in 1891–1892), Bal nes (four acts, staged in Iași with Juvelier in 1893), Pantilemon, and Ruth, a five-act opera which was never staged, Gog umogeg (a revue staged in Iași in 1920), Der yarid in himl (a one-act play), and Dos litvakl. He also wrote for and edited a number of newspapers and magazines: Hayoyets, Folksblat, Yudishe Tsukunft, and Hamevaser, Helman's own literary magazine which he published from 1903 onwards. For some time in the 1890s he also quit the theater and became a Hazzan in a synagogue again, although he soon returned to Yiddish songwriting.

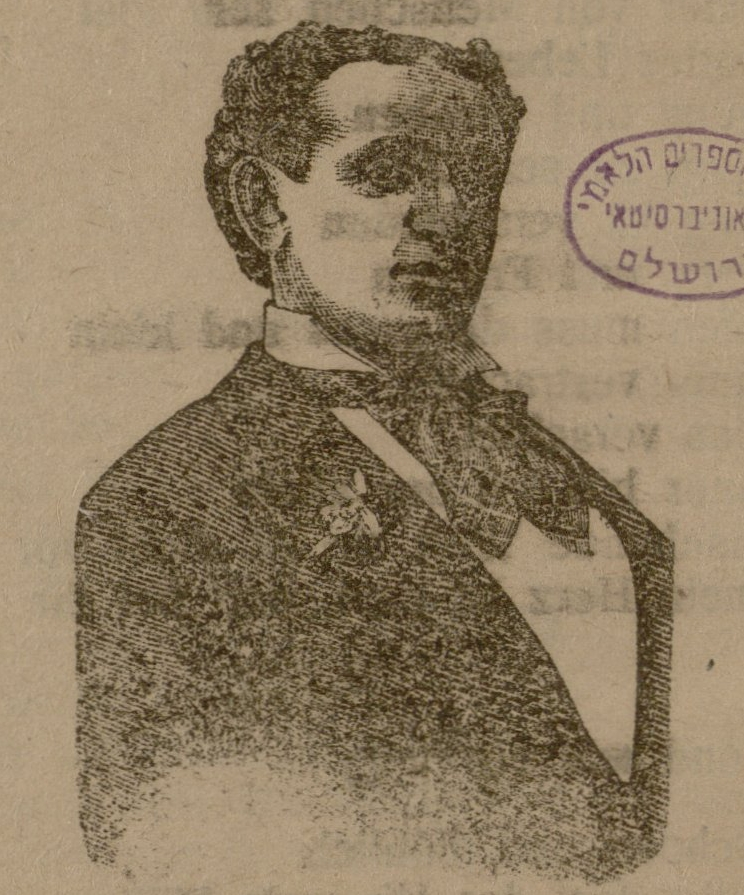
Zeydl Helman

Although he was not really a socialist, he also worked as editor for the socialist magazines Lumina and later Der veker (not to be confused with the later newspaper of the same name Der Veker (Minsk)). He published semi-autobiographical booklets in the 1920s, titled Kitve hazman and Yontev bleter.

He became blind late in life and apparently died in Iași in 1938.
