= Simon Paskal =

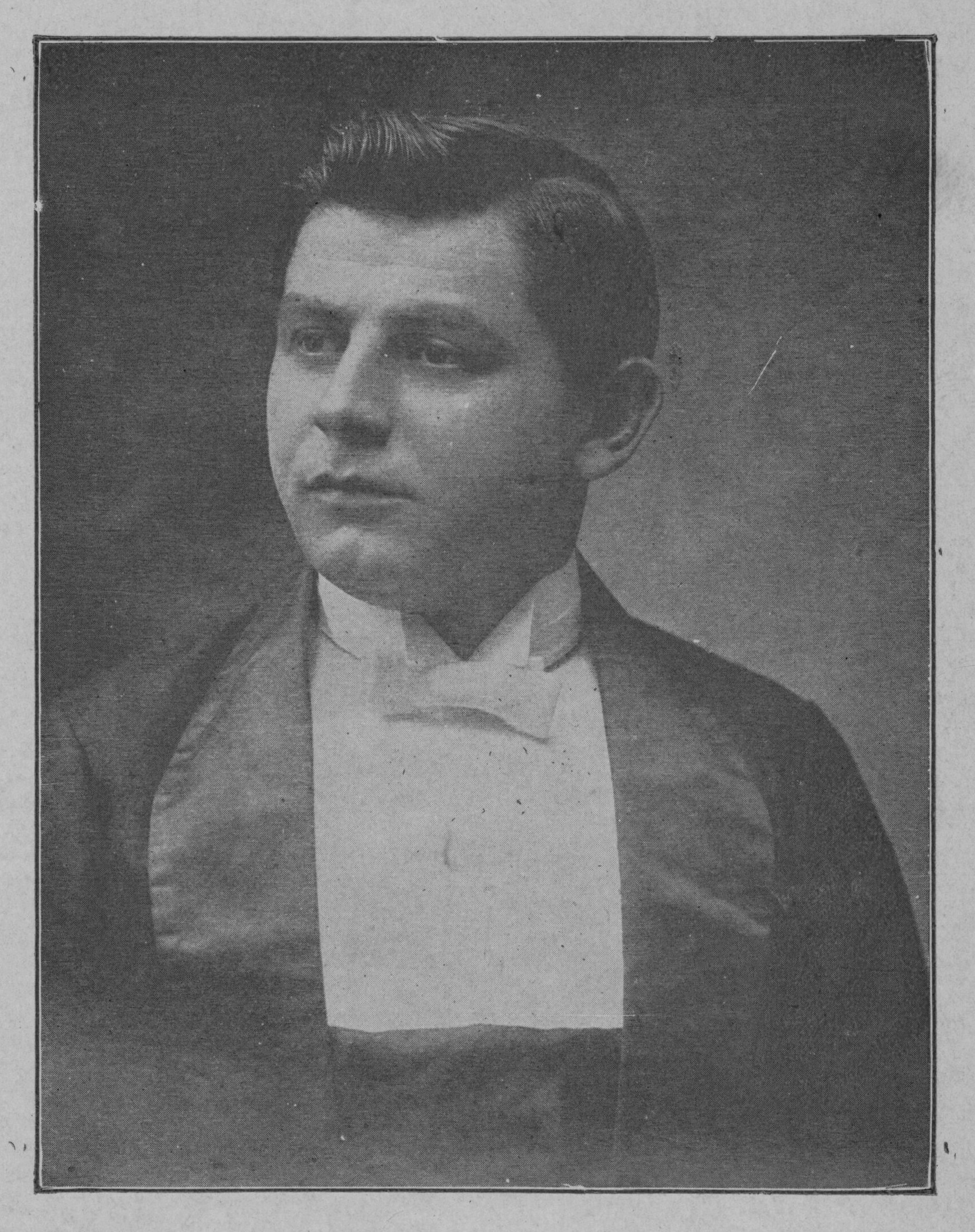
Simon Paskal, Yiddish tenor c. 1910

Simon Paskal (Yiddish: שמעון פּאַסקאַל or סײמאן פּאַסקאַל; February 8, 1877 – October 17, 1930) was a Romanian-born American Yiddish Theater actor and tenor who recorded numerous Yiddish-language discs during the early twentieth century.

== Early life ==
Paskal was the son of a blacksmith, and worked for his father as a youth; due to his excellent singing voice he also became a choirboy for Cantor Abraham Osher in Galați. According to his First World War draft registration card Simon was born on February 8, 1877.

During the 1899 anti-Semitic riots in Romania, Paskal left the country on foot (part of the movement called the fusgeyers), eventually arriving in the United States in 1900 according to the Lexicon of Yiddish Theatre, or 1903 according to census documents.

By 1904, his wife Sarah had joined him in the United States. He soon became a Yiddish-language singer in New York City's east side, and then became a vaudeville actor. In the first five years Simon and Sarah were in New York, they had two daughters, Pearl and Dorothy.

== Musical career ==
In the first decade of his arrival in the United States, Paskal began to record numerous Yiddish-language records for Zonophone, including Avram Goldfaden compositions such as Dos yoseml, as well as more contemporary compositions by Louis Friedsell, Arnold Perlmutter, and others. In the 1910s he began to record on other labels such as Victor Records and Columbia Records. In addition to Yiddish music, he also recorded a number of Romanian language songs for those labels.

Paskal left the United States for Montreal during this time, and joined a troupe headed by Jacob Silbert; by 1913 he returned to the United States and joined Louis Coopersmith's Cleveland Royal Theatre, acting in such plays as Bar Kokhba and Shulamis. He also continued to record during this time.

A 1918 advertisement in the Yiddish newspaper Morgen Zhurnal promoted a concert he held with Clara Gold, Benny Zeidman and other Yiddish singers promised songs from the best operas, Jewish songs, and new comedy songs. Another advertisement in the Morgen Zhurnal two years later described "an entirely new English novelty act".

Seeking a change of career, he eventually trained as a cantor and performed less and less in the theater the early 1920s. Some notable appearances he did make were in a 1921 Yiddish-language production of La Juive at the Lexington Theatre, and the titular role in Bar Kokhba in a 1922 production. He began to record more Hebrew liturgical music for Victor Records and OKeh Records during the early 1920s, although he continued to record Yiddish songs as well.

He died on October 17, 1930, in New York City. Contemporary newspapers reported his death as a suicide.
