= Bina Abramowitz =

Russian actress

Bina Abramowitz (née Fuchs; 30 October 1865 – 1953) was a Russian-born Jewish American actress and singer who was active in Yiddish theatre. She began her career at the age of 14 as a chorus girl in Sigmund Mogulesko’s company in Odessa. After performing with Naphtali Goldfaden's troupe, she rejoined Mogulesko's company for its tour to the United States in 1886. She remained in America, and became a successful stage actress in Yiddish theatre in that country. In her late career she performed as a leading actress with the Yiddish Art Theatre in New York City from 1927-1937. She also worked as an actress in American films.

== Life and career ==
Bina Fuchs was born on 30 October 1865 in Saratov, Russia. Her father was a cantonist and tailor who was conscripted as a soldier under an edict by Czar Nicholas I. The family settled in Nikolayev, and despite her father's status as a soldier, were at one time expelled from the city due to their Jewish background. The family later returned, and her father died in Nikolayev.

At fourteen, Fuchs joined the chorus of Sigmund Mogulesko’s company in Odessa. After joining the company she went unpaid for four months. She later acted with Naphtali Goldfaden’s troupe, where she had a salary and was typecast as mother characters. While touring Bessarabia Goldfaden's troupe she met the actor and musician Max Abramowitz. They married and then toured Russia together giving concerts.

In 1886 Abramowitz and her husband toured to the United States with Mogulesko's theatre troupe; ultimately remaining in America for the remainder of her life other than a tour to London in 1924. He husband Max died in 1905, and she married a second timeto Kalman Juvelier in 1910. While she played with many Yiddish companies in the United States, she was particularly active with the Yiddish Art Theatre (YAT) in New York City where she gained the moniker "The Mother of the Yiddish Theatre." She was with this company for ten years; signing a contract with the YAT in 1927 at the age of sixty-two. At that time The Evening Standard described Abramowitz as a "mother of six and grandmother of nine." One of her roles with this company was Cashe Dobe in Peretz Hirschbein's folk musical Once Upon a Time which was stage at the 2nd Avenue Theatre in 1933.

Abramowitz played roles in several films produced in America. Her roles included Broken Hearts (1926), a silent film directed by Maurice Schwartz, and the Yiddish-language films The Unfortunate Bride (1932) and Yiskor (1933), as well as roles in Jacob Gordin's plays.

Abramowitz died on 24 June 1953.
