= Samuel Goldenberg (actor) =

Yiddish actor (1883/1884–1945)

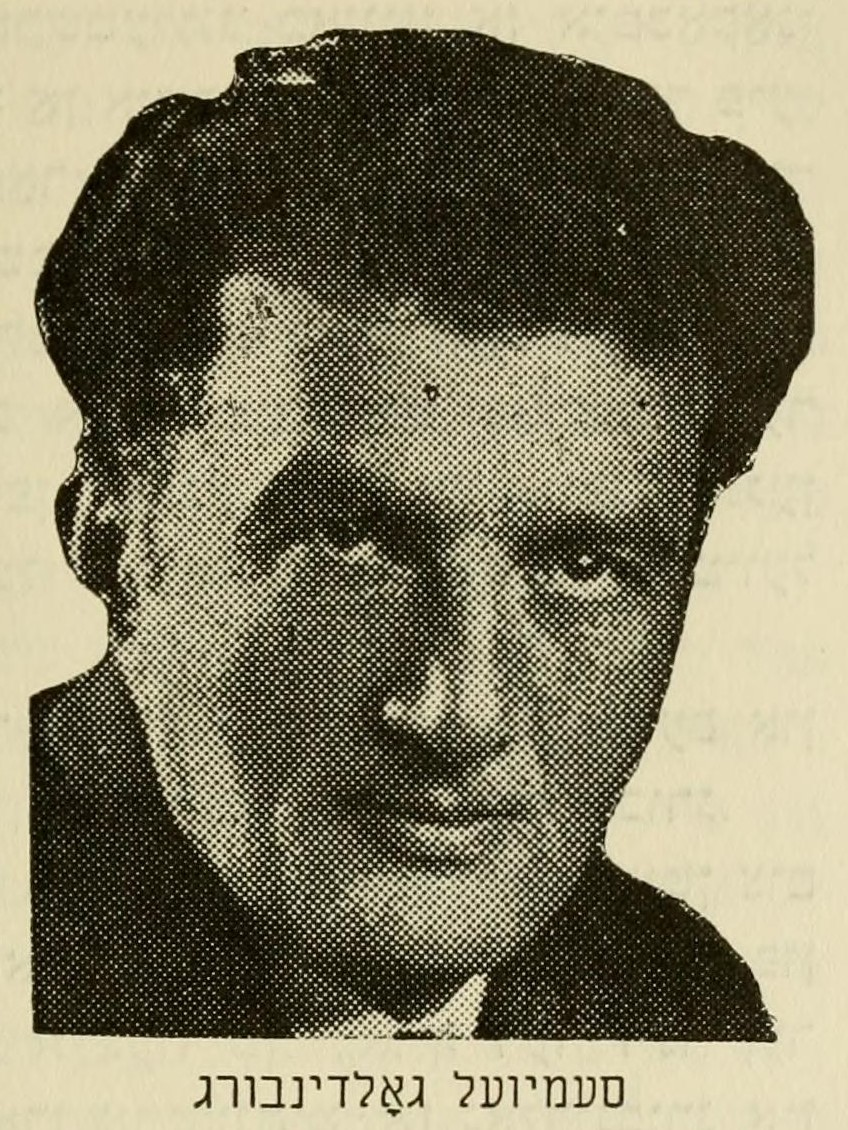
- Samuel Goldenberg portrait from Klangen fun mayn lebn by Zalmen Zylbercweig
- Born: 1883 or 1884
- Died: October 31, 1945 (aged 61)
- Occupation: Actor

Samuel Goldenberg (1883/1884–1945) was an actor in Yiddish theatre on stage and screen.

== Career ==
Goldenberg worked as a tailor before becoming a leading Yiddish-language actor-singer-pianist. He was known to incorporate piano solos into dramatic scenes, such as the gimmick of hiding a piano behind tombstones props to raise music from the dead. Goldenberg's performances included the title role in the Yiddish Art Theatre's Jew Suess, Svengali in Trilby, and Dr. Jekyll and Mr. Hyde. He also appeared in English-language Broadway productions. His English-language roles, included in the Theatre Guild's American Dream, The Eternal Road, and The Cherry Orchard. He headlined the 1935 Yiddish film Shir Hashirim (Song of Songs), which ran in the Union Square Acme Theatre. The New York Times described his performance as effective.

He played in Yiddish road shows. In early 1922, his five-week engagement with the Yiddish Toronto National Company, which went through Buffalo's Teck Theatre, grossed what Variety described as exceptional for Yiddish theatre. The magazine described him as among "the surest money-getters on the Yiddish stage". In 1924, The Philadelphia Inquirer said Goldenberg to have "unusual talent" and adaptability in both comedy and tragedy.

Goldenberg had been cast as Leon Trotsky in the 1943 film Mission to Moscow but his scenes were edited out in the final release. Incidentally, Goldenberg had previously played Trotsky in a drama about the Russian Revolution 20 years prior.

== Personal life ==
Goldenberg graduated from the Warsaw Conservatory and spoke about six languages. At some point, he managed a theater in New York's Irving Place.

Goldenberg had a wife and two daughters. He died October 31, 1945, at the age of 61 in Brooklyn's Unity Hospital following a heart attack a week prior. The heart attack had occurred on stage during his performance of Apartment 7.

== Bibliography ==
- Hoberman, J. (1991). Bridge of Light: Yiddish Film Between Two Worlds. Schocken Books. ISBN 978-0-8052-4107-5.
