= Art Shryer =

Russian-born American Klezmer cornetist, bandleader and recording artist

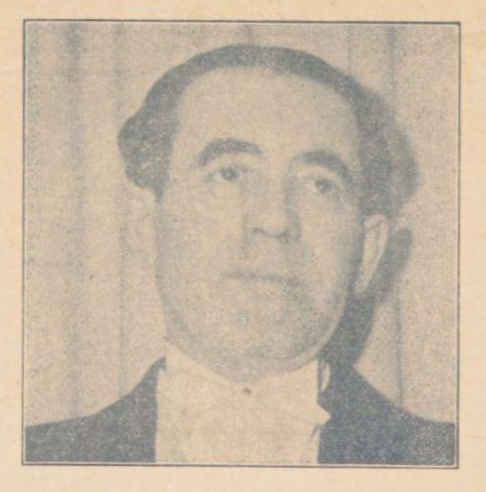
Art Shryer, klezmer musician and bandleader (c.1936)

Abraham "Art" Shryer (Yiddish: אַבֿרהם שרײער Avrum Shreyer, born c. 1883) was a Russian-born American Klezmer cornetist, bandleader, and recording artist who was active in the New York City area in the 1920s and 1930s. In the late 1920s he recorded a number of Jewish and other Eastern European music sides for Brunswick Records, Vocalion Records, and Victor Records.

== Biography ==
Shryer was born in Teofipol, Volhynian Governorate, Russian Empire (now in Ukraine) on March 15, 1883. His early life, family background and musical training are poorly documented. Later in life he inconsistently stated that he had been born in Galicia, Austria-Hungary or in Russia. He did indeed leave Russia for Galicia at some point before emigrating to the United States; he lived in Skalat and Chortkiv, both in the Ternopil area and immediately across the border from Teofipol. He emigrated twice to the U.S. to see his uncle in St. Louis, Missouri, apparently returning to Galicia in between. The first time was in February 1907, sailing from Liverpool to New York City. His second and final emigration was in March 1912, sailing from Hamburg to Philadelphia before relocating to Missouri and living there for a time. At some point during the following decade he relocated to New York.

The majority of his recording career for 78-rpm records seems to have taken place in 1924, 1928, and 1929 in the New York area. His first recordings were made at Vocalion Records in New York in April 1924, where he recorded four klezmer tracks with a seven-piece orchestra under the name Art Shryer's Modern Jewish Orchestra. His next round of recording was at Brunswick Records in January 1928, where he recorded four Jewish sides with a ten-piece orchestra which he called Art Shryer's Yiddish Orchestra. He then returned to the same studio in April of that year to record another round of sides of Slavic music under the title Russky Narodny Orkestr. His final round of recordings seems to have been at the Victor Recording Company in New York in January 1929, where he recorded another six sides of klezmer with a ten-piece orchestra. The passing of the Immigration Act of 1924 which greatly restricted Jewish immigration from Europe, and then the onset of the Great Depression by 1930, essentially cut off the market for Yiddish and klezmer recordings in the United States. Perhaps for that reason, Shryer does not seem to have recorded in studio again, although he did continue to perform on the radio, on stage and even occasionally on film.

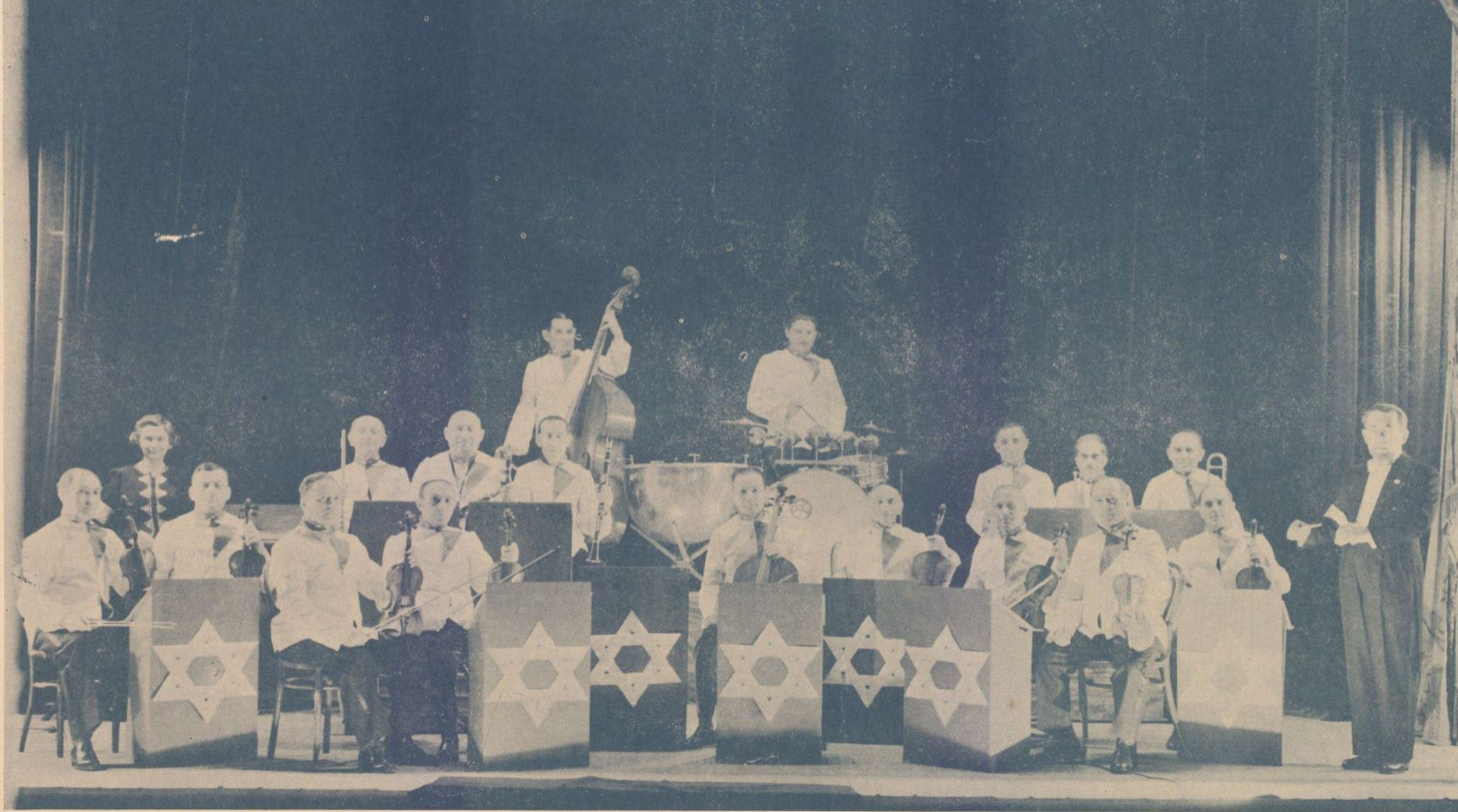
Jewish orchestra led by Art Shryer, mid-1930s

During the 1920s and 1930s he regularly appeared on the radio in the New York areas, playing Jewish music with his orchestra, or playing cornet solo pieces. He also had a brief career arranging music for Yiddish language films. In 1932, he directed the music for Henry Lynn's Talkie Die ungluckliche Kale (The Unfortunate Bride), as well as for another film that year called Mazel Tov, a Judea Films picture featuring Molly Picon. After that, he was often hired on touring showings of Yiddish films, including The Unfortunate Bride and Yiddish King Lear. He got into trouble with the law during this time; in May 1935 he was arrested and charged for stealing rolls of film from the Dupont Film Corporation. It is unclear what his role was in the theft or what happened subsequently.

In the 1950 census he gave his occupation as "Musician, Catering Band." His date of death is unknown.

== Legacy ==
During and after the Klezmer revival, there was renewed interest in klezmer recordings of earlier decades, and some of Shryer's records started to appear on reissue albums. These were primarily curated by Henry Sapoznik, and include Klezmer pioneers 1905-1952: European and American recordings (Rounder Records, 1993), Jakie jazz 'em up: old-time klezmer music, 1912-1926 (Global Village, 1993), and Cantors, klezmorim, and crooners, 1905-1953: classic Yiddish 78s from the Mayrent Collection (JSP, 2009).
