= His Wife's Lover =

1931 film

His Wife's Lover (1931, original Yiddish title Zayn Vaybs Lubovnik) was billed as the "first Jewish musical comedy talking picture". A play before it as a film, it was based on Ferenc Molnár's The Guardsman. Ludwig Satz, who also wrote the songs, plays an actor who disguises himself as an old man, wins the hand of a beautiful young woman, then adopts a different persona and tries to seduce her to test her fidelity.

Satz's performance in this farce has been compared to the work of later Jewish comic performers such as Jerry Lewis.
