= Ludwig Satz =

American theater and film actor (1891–1944)

Satz played an atypically serious role in 1937's Moshiach Kumt ("The Messiah is Coming")

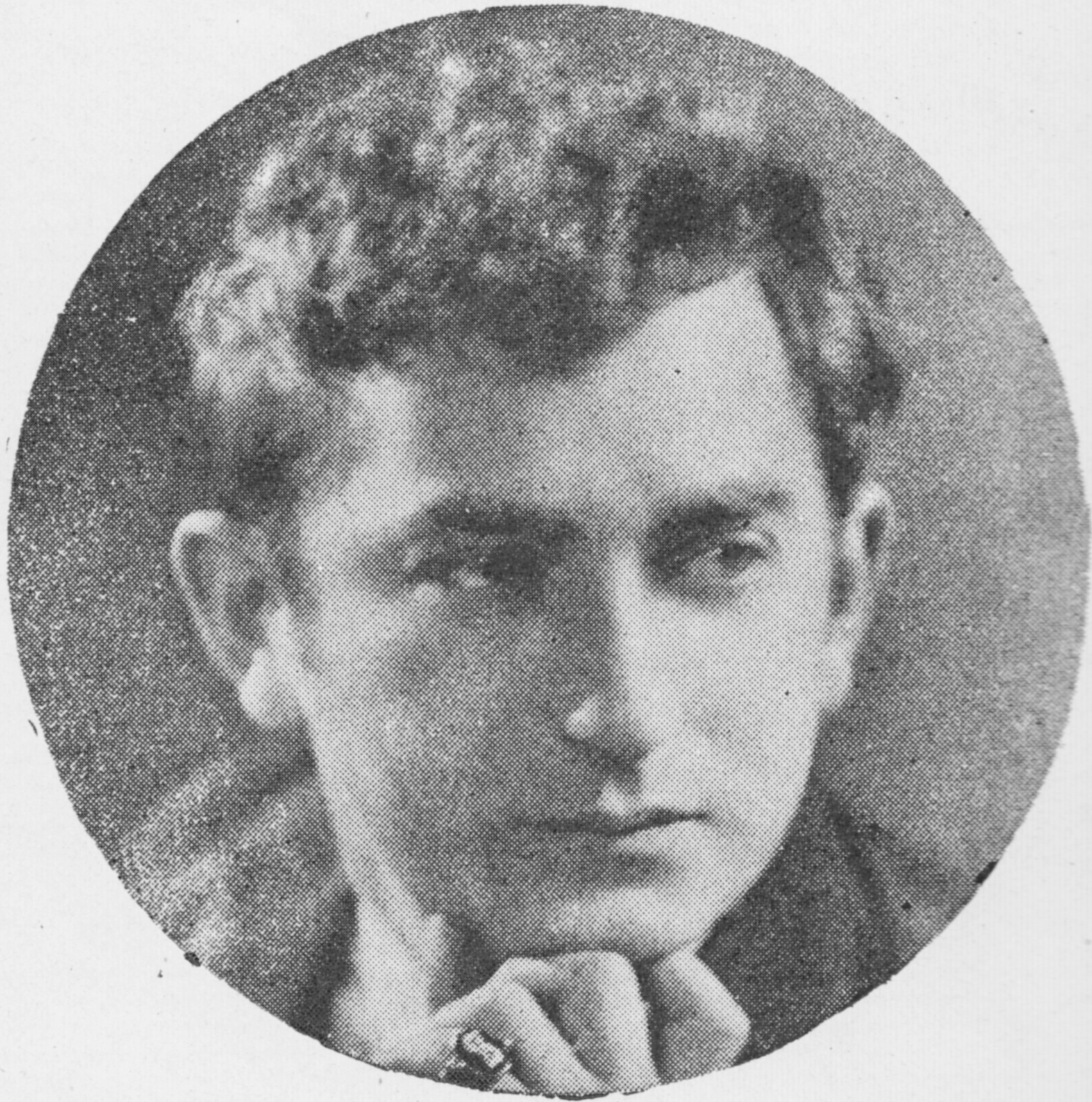
Ludvig Zats (Ludwig Satz)

Ludwig Satz (18 February 1891 – 31 August 1944) was an actor in Yiddish theater and film, best known for his comic roles. A 1925 New York Times article singles him out as the greatest Yiddish comic actor of the time.

He was born in Lemberg (Lwów), Austria-Hungary (now Lviv, Ukraine). At the age of 18 he formed his own theater company in Galicia; he emigrated to the U.S. in 1912. He played the male lead in the 1931 film His Wife's Lover (Zayn Vaybs Lubovnik), which was billed as the "first Jewish musical comedy talking picture". He also played on Broadway, one of his more noted roles being Abe Potash in the 1926 Potash and Perlmuter of A. H. Woods. He starred in A Galitsianer Khasene (A wedding in Galitsia) (music by Herman Wohl, lyrics Boris Rozenthal) with Zina Goldstein and in Ven di zun geyt oyf (Sunrise) with Ola Lilith. His last role was in The Golden Land at the Public Theatre in 1943.

He died in New York City in 1944 survived by his widow, Lillie (née Feinman, daughter of actress Dinah Stettin); three daughters (Celia, Mimi, and Frances); two brothers, Alexander and Eli, the last "an actor known professionally as Eli Mintz".
