= Nahum Meir Schaikewitz =

19th century Yiddish writer

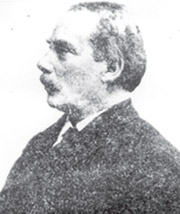
"Shomer"

Nahum Meïr Schaikewitz, also known by his pseudonym "Shomer" (December 18, 1849 in Nesvizh, Russian Empire – 25 November 1905 in New York City) was a Yiddish and Hebrew novelist and playwright. Although he was very popular in his time and a giant in Yiddish literature, sometimes styled the "Dumas of Yiddish literature", he was significantly damaged by Sholem Aleichem, who derided his plotting as extravagantly artificial and improbable, characteristic of a cheap potboiler.

His works have sometimes been referred to as the shund literature, he is sometimes named the pioneer of this type of literature.

== Life and works ==
Schaikewitz was born at Nesvizh, in the then government of Minsk, in the Russian Empire, on December 18, 1849. He distinguished himself as a clever story-teller even as a boy. His first literary efforts took the form of short stories in Hebrew for Ha-Meliẓ; in this way he became acquainted with such writers of Hebrew as Ẓebi Hirsch Scherschewski, Dobsevage, and others. Later he became a business manager in Vilnius, and spent some time in traveling. While in Bucharest he came under the influence of the Jewish theater and resolved to become a dramatic author. He then settled in Odessa, where he became theatrical manager and playwright at the Mariinski Theatre. His play Der Rewizor (Odessa, 1883), an adaptation from Gogol's Revizor (The Government Inspector), proved very successful and showed Schaikewitz's talent as a writer. After the Jewish theater was closed in Russia, Schaikewitz went to New York in 1888, where he edited Der Menschenfreund and Der Jüdischer Puck, two Yiddish-language weeklies.

Schaikewitz is the author of several Hebrew novels, all representing Jewish life in Russian towns. Among these are: Mumar le-Hak'is (Warsaw, 1879); Kewiyah Taḥat Kewiyah and Ṭa'ut Goi (Warsaw. 1880); and Ha-Niddaḥat (vols. 1 and 2, Vilnius, 1886; vol. 3, Warsaw, 1887). He also wrote Ḳayin (Warsaw, 1887), a novel on Jewish life in Portugal. But Schaikewitz became especially known as a writer in Yiddish, taking as a model, and finally excelling, Isaac Meir Dick. He wrote over two hundred novels in Yiddish, partly historical and partly reflecting Jewish life in the small towns and villages of Russia in the middle of the nineteenth century. As his language is simple, just as was spoken by the Jewish masses in Lithuania, his novels had the effect of greatly decreasing the fanaticism which prevailed in the small rural and urban communities. Among his more popular novels were Der Ḳaṭorzḥnikh, Der Blutiger Adieu, and Der Frumer Merder. Many of his historical novels appeared in the Yiddish daily press.

Over thirty of Schaikewitz's plays were produced, first in Russia, then in New York, among them being one entitled Tisza-Eslar, on the subject of the blood accusation brought in the Hungarian town of that name. Others included Der Bel Tchuve (The Penitent) and Trefnyak (The Impure One). He was the subject of vitriolic attacks by S. Rabinovitz ("Sholem Aleichem"), who directed against him his Shomer's Mishpaṭ (Berdychev, 1888), reproaching him for his literary deficiencies. Schaikewitz successfully defended himself in a pamphlet entitled Yehi Or (New York, 1898), showing that his literary problem was to satisfy every plane of intelligence, from the householder to the servant-girl who could not understand the works of the later Yiddish writers. Jacob Adler later wrote of his melodramas that: "Nothing so crude as this can be found in Goldfaden... [but] the humor in Sheikevitch is more believable."

== Death ==
At his funeral procession, a reported 100,000 people gathered, in two different locations. This march coincided with two other mass actions one occurring on November 30 and the other on December 4, called the Great Troyer March. It is unclear if the crowds at Schaikewitz's funeral procession independently or organized by various Jewish groups active at the time.
