= Dora Weissman =

American actress (1881–1974)

Dora Weissman (1881–1974) was a Ukrainian-born American actress. She acted in Yiddish theater, and later in English-language theater, radio, television, and film. After World War II she also taught acting, and was a talent agent. Weissmann took pride in helping younger actors, and contributed to launching the careers of Belle Baker, Molly Picon, and Paul Muni.

== Life ==
Dora Weissman was born in Odessa, Ukraine. When she was two, the family emigrated to the United States. There they settled in New York City. Her sister, Bessie Bain, was also a Yiddish theater and Broadway performer. Their father Reuben Weissman was a Yiddish playwright, translator, prompter, and organizer of the Hebrew Actors' Union.

Dora began acting in her father's productions as a child. After earning a degree at Hunter College, she attended medical school for two years before returning to the stage. In 1921 she married playwright Anshel Schorr. Schorr featured Weissmann in many of his productions at Philadelphia's Arch Street Theatre and Brooklyn's Liberty Theatre. The couple toured Europe in 1928 and Argentina in the early 1930s. Schorr died in 1942.

Weissman's English-language Broadway debut was in Hitch Your Wagon (1937), directed by Garson Kanin. She played a leading role in The Jazz Singer (1945) at Brooklyn's Brighton Theater, and appeared on Broadway in 1946 in A Flag is Born. Other Broadway productions in which she appeared were Two on an Island, The Man with Blond Hair, A New Life and Down to Miami. She toured with Luise Rainer in Biography. In the 1940s and 1950s she also appeared in many radio and television shows. She played multiple parts in Gertrude Berg's radio series The Goldbergs, and played Mrs. Herman when the show transferred to television. She also acted in Berg's 1953-54 radio show The House of Glass. Weissman had supporting roles in two of Paddy Chayefsky's Philco Television Playhouse episodes, "Holiday Song" and "The Mother". In 1971 she appeared in the feature films The Panic in Needle Park and The Hospital.

In 1945 Weissman established her own acting school. Originally called the New Theatre Arts School, it later became known as the Dora Weissman School of Theatre Arts. The actor Gubi Mann was associate director. She also worked as a talent agent between the late 1940s and the 1960s.

Weissman died on May 21, 1974 in New York City. Papers relating to her are held at the New York Public Library.
