= The Mother (The Philco Television Playhouse) =

- The Philco Television Playhouse episode
- Episode no.: Season 6 Episode 14
- Written by: Paddy Chayefsky
- Original air date: April 4, 1954

Guest appearances
- Cathleen Nesbitt; Maureen Stapleton; Faye Emerson

"The Mother" is an episode of the TV anthology series The Philco Television Playhouse.

The episode was highly acclaimed critically.
