= Abraham Baer Dobsewitch =

19th century Russian Hebraist and exegete

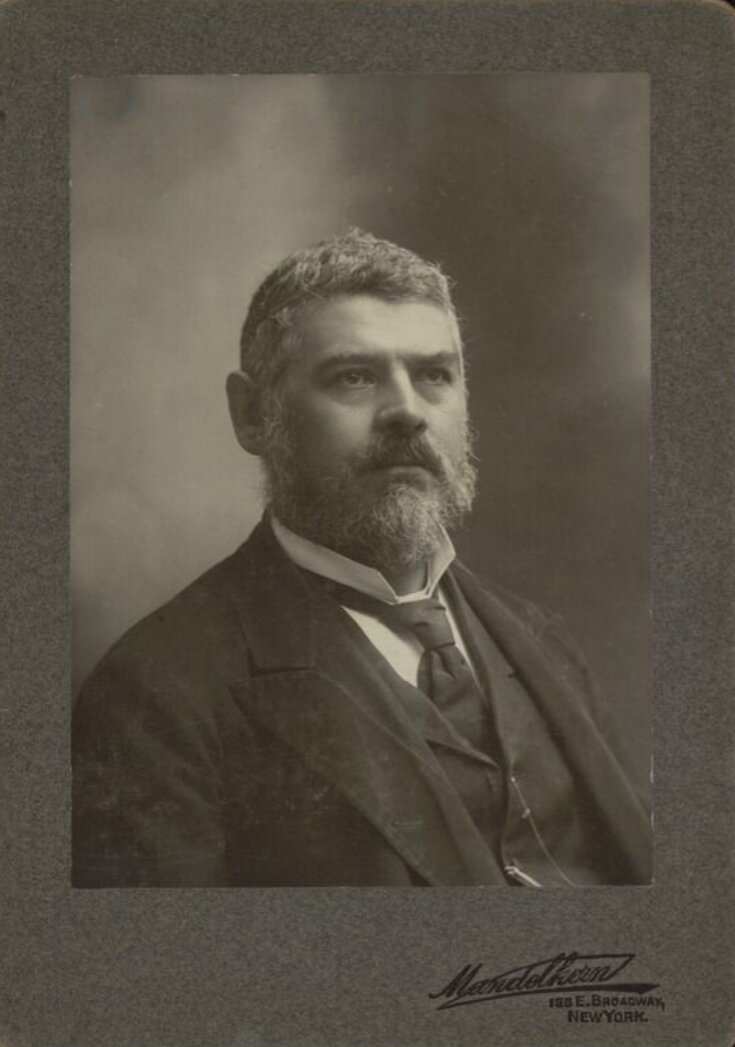
Abraham Baer Dobsewitch, 1890-1900

Abraham Baer ben Joseph Ezra Dobsewitch (or Dobsevage) (born Pinsk, October 17, 1843; died New York City, January 14, 1900) was a Russian Hebraist and exegete.

== Life ==
At the age of thirteen Dobsewitch had written a commentary to the Song of Songs. In 1861 he went to Yekaterinoslav, where he settled as a teacher of Hebrew and contributed to various Hebrew periodicals. In 1874 he removed to Kiev, where he became a private tutor to the sons of Brodski and of other wealthy families. He went to the United States in 1891, and lived in New York City, leaving it only for a short time in 1895.

Dobsewitch's chief published work is Ha-Meẓaref (The Refiner), a collection of rationalistic interpretations of various passages of the Aggadah (Odessa, 1870). Dobsewitch's two later works, Be-Ḥada Maḥeta (With One Sweep), a collection of articles (Cracow, 1888), and Lo Dubbim we-lo Ya'ar (Neither Bears nor Forest) (Berdyehev, 1890), as well as numerous articles in Hebrew periodicals, are devoted to criticisms directed against Shatzkes, Weissberg, and others. He continued his literary activity in the United States, and contributed to Ha-'Ibri, Ner ha-Ma'arabi, and various Yiddish publications. Some of his correspondence was published in Ha-Modi'a le-Ḥadashim, i., New York, 1900.

Dobsewitch left several works in manuscript, including one on the Masorah, one on the Samaritan text of the Pentateuch, and one on the wit and humor of ancient Jewish literature. Short extracts from the last-named work were published in the United States.

== Jewish Encyclopedia bibliography ==
- American Hebrew, lxvi., No. 11;
- Jewish Gazette, xxvi., No. 3;
- Jewish Journal, i., No. 35;
- Ha-Meliẓ, 1900, No. 34;
- Ha-Ẓefirah, 1900, No. 46;
- Aḥiasaf for 5661 [1900/1901], p. 392.
