= Reuben Doctor =

Yiddish actor and songwriter

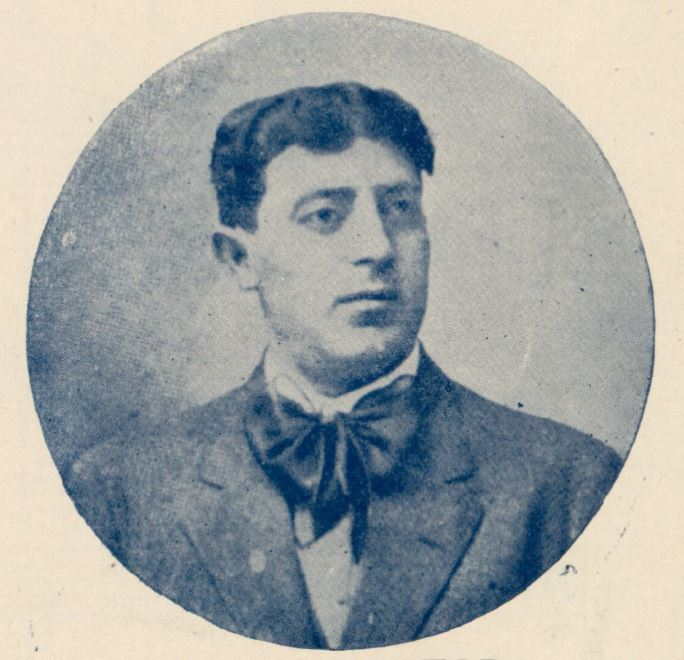
A portrait of Reuben Doctor, Yiddish-language actor and songwriter

Reuben Doctor or Rubin Doctor (Yiddish: רובין דאקטער or רובין דאקטאר, c. 1880 – c. 1940) was an actor of the Yiddish Theater, best known as a prolific writer of Yiddish songs during the early Twentieth century. His most well known song was his 1922 piece, "Ikh bin a "boarder" bay mayn vayb" ("I'm a Boarder at My Wife's").

== Early life ==
Doctor's father was a kosher meat tax collector, and until the age of fourteen he had a traditional Jewish education in a Cheder. At some point in the 1890s, possibly 1896, he emigrated to England, where he began his involvement in the musical theater while supporting himself as a hairdresser. He met many of the actors in the London Yiddish Theater milieu and eventually made his debut as the character Marcus in Abraham Goldfaden's The Sorceress.

== Musical career ==
Around 1908 or 1910, Doctor relocated to the United States, where some of his family members were already living, and began to see real success in the musical theater, and especially as a Yiddish language songwriter. His compositions were used in the Yiddish musical theater, vaudeville, radio, and commercial recordings. He published at least 100 songs and recorded more than 50. Although he is less remembered for these, he apparently wrote plays as well, such as Der kales kind ("the Bride's Child") in 1912.

For a time he was also active in union politics, as in 1919 he was listed as the secretary of the American Hebrew Vaudeville Actors Union.

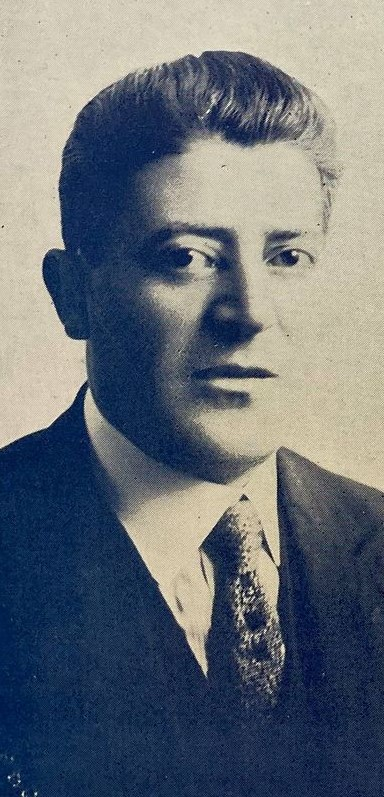
Rubin Doctor (c.1923)

Doctor died around 1940 in New York City, although the exact date is disputed.
