= Arnold Perlmutter =

Yiddish theatre composer (1859–1953)

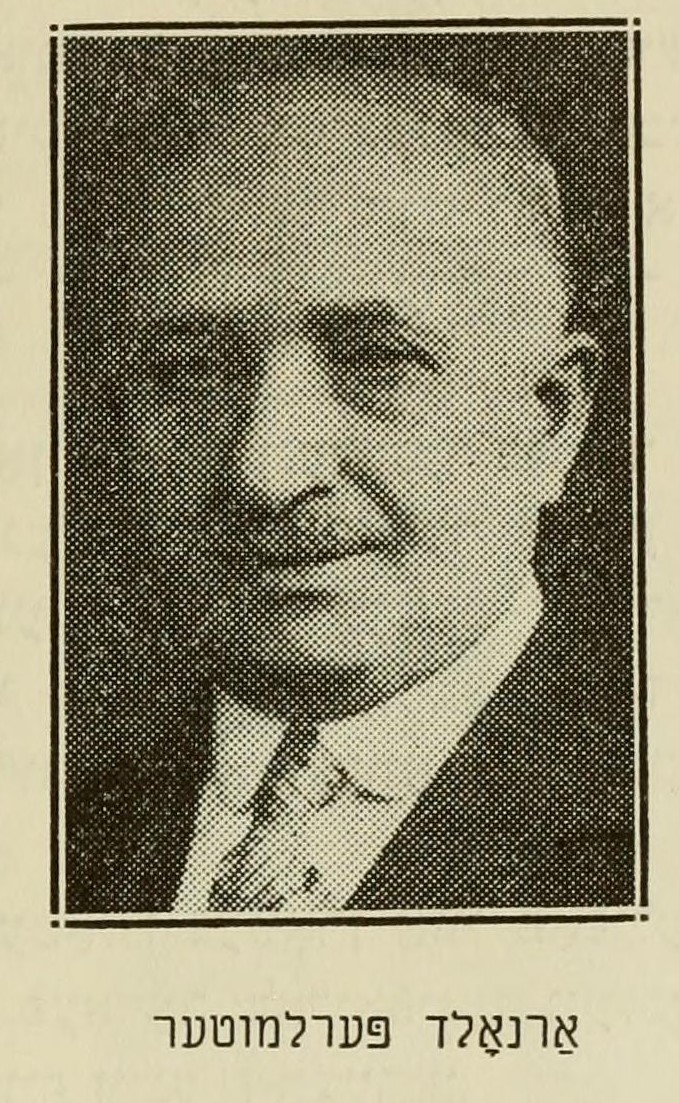
Arnold Perlmutter (from Klangen fun mayn lebn (1944) by Zalmen Zylbercweig.

Arnold Perlmutter (Yiddish: אַרנאָלד פּערלמוטער, 1859–1953) was a composer for Yiddish theatre, born in Zolochiv, Galicia, Austria-Hungary. He moved to Lemberg where he received both a religious and a secular education in Polish, Ukrainian, and German. He sang with then-famous hazzan Borekh Shor's chorus until his voice changed, then became a klezmer, playing bass and then violin and directing and composing for the Harmonia orchestra, which in 1889 was taken into I. B. Gimpel's Yiddish theater in Lemberg; he wrote the music for the operetta Rabbi Akiva and his students. and Der Spanisher Tsigayner (The Spanish Gypsy).

In 1891 Abraham Goldfaden came to Lemberg to stage his Meshiakh tsaytn (Messiah times) and Dos tsente gebot (The Tenth Commandment); Perlmutter orchestrated and reworked Goldfaden's collected musical numbers and composed new ones for his productions. He then toured with the Treytler and Yuvelir troupes throughout Galitsia, Romania (1893-1895) and Russia (1899). From Chernovitz, Bukovina, in 1900 Professor Moyshe Horvitz (Hurwitz) took the whole troupe to America.

Perlmutter met his longtime collaborator Herman Wohl in New York's Windsor Theater and they wrote for dozens of Hurwitz's operettas as well as Di almoneh (The widow) and A mentsh zol men zayn (One should be a righteous person) by Anshel Schorr. In 1906 Perlmutter and Wohl composed the music for a romantic drama in English, The Shepherd King; in 1909, Boris Thomashefsky's Dos Pintele Yid and Di sheyne Amerikanerin; and for scores of other historical operettas of the Second Avenue Yiddish Theater District theaters through the early years of the twentieth century.

After the partnership dissolved Perlmutter worked alone, composing for Maurice Schwartz's production in 1920 of I. L. Peretz's Di goldene keyt (The golden chain). In 1922 he contracted with the Lennox Theater in the Bronx (directors Nathan Goldberg and Jacob Jacobs). He wrote the music for dozens of productions until he retired from theater in 1930.
