= Louis Gilrod =

Ukrainian Yiddish actor and lyricist

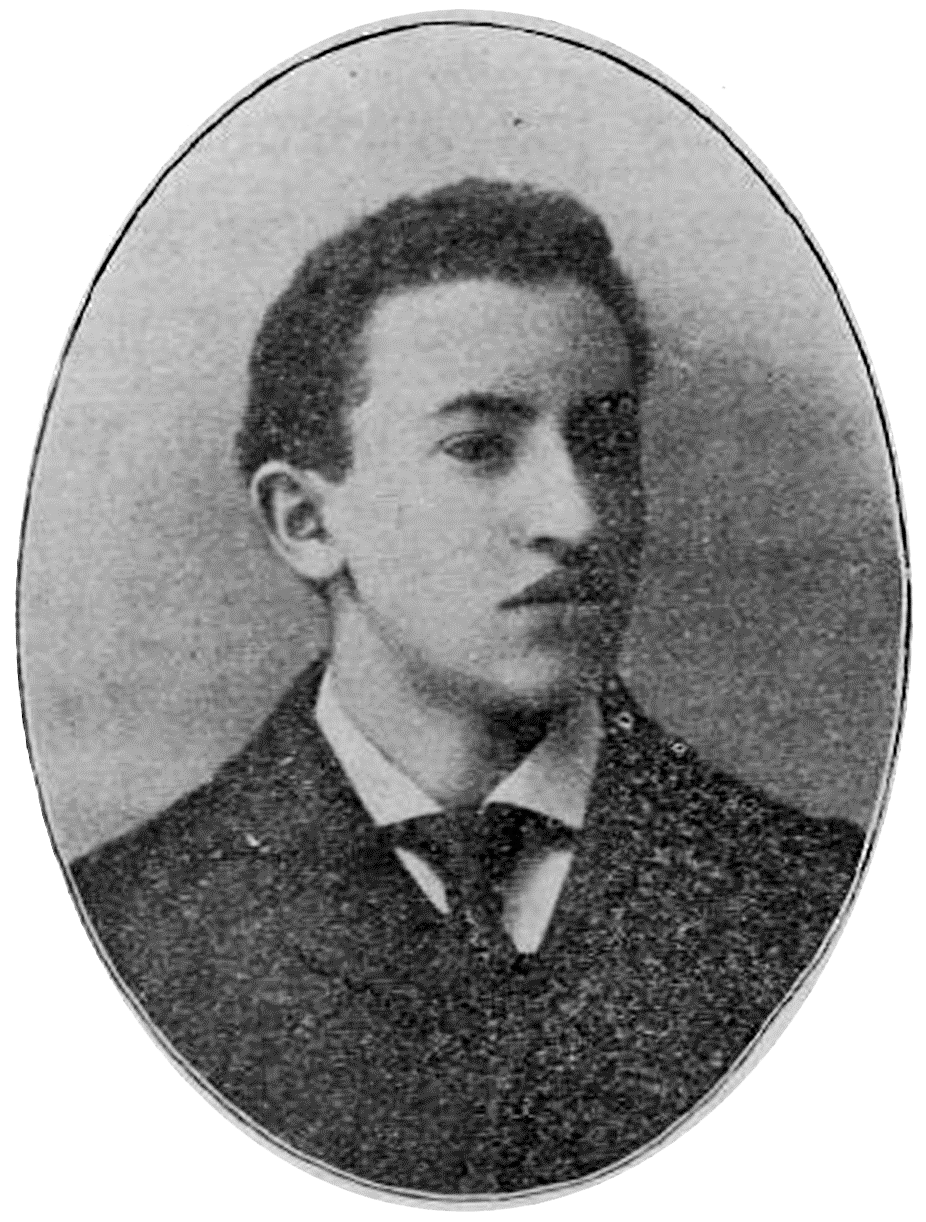
Louis Gilrod in an 1899 publication

Louis Gilrod (1879-1930), was an actor and lyricist for the Yiddish theater.

Louis Gilrod was born in the village of Ruizana, near Ulanov, in the Podolia/Poltava region of Ukraine. At 12 his father brought him to the United States and left him with an uncle in Newark, New Jersey who engaged him in the hairdressing business. He was, however, drawn to the stage; at 17 he founded a drama club and began to write lyrics. Actors started to notice him and brought him to New York where he became a professional lyricist. The Yehudah Katzenelenbogen Company (later absorbed into the Hebrew Publishing Company) and other music publishers paid him to write Yiddish parodies of currently popular American songs of Tin Pan Alley.

Two of his early successes were Got un zayn mishpet iz gerekht and Kum, Yisrolikl, aheym. He wrote the libretto to the operetta Dos pintele yud (The essential Jew) (New York, 1909), and for The Golden Bride in 1923. He also played small roles at the Thalia and Windsor Theatres and in vaudeville, for which he wrote one-acters. He worked regularly at the National, the Irving Place Theatre, the Lyric Theater in Brooklyn and in 1926 at the public theater. After that ill health forced him to retire from the stage. The last show for which he wrote lyrics was Dos freylekhe yesoymele of 1930.

His wife, Paula Weiss, played in Yiddish vaudeville.

He died in New York March 12, 1930.
