= Solomon Smulewitz =

Jewish songwriter, actor and recording artist (1868–1943)

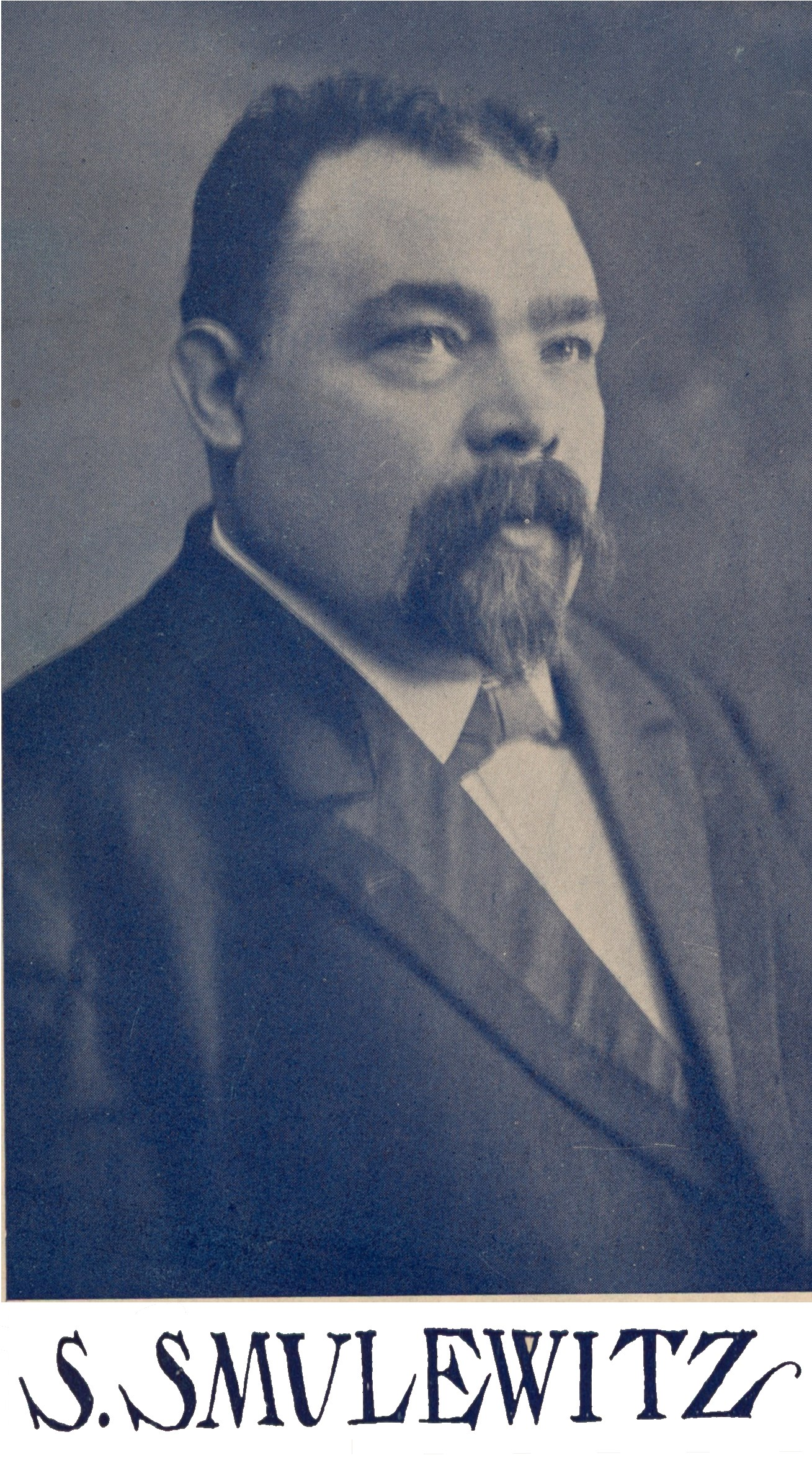
- Born: 1868
- Died: 1943 (aged 74–75)
- Occupations: Singer, Composer
- Spouse: Tillie Small (b. 1873)
- Children: 5

Solomon Smulewitz (Yiddish: שלמה שמולעװיץ, 1868–1943), sometimes known by the anglicized name Solomon Small, was a Russian-born American tenor, folk poet, badchen, playwright, recording artist, and composer for the yiddish theatre. He wrote hundreds of songs, many of which were recorded during the heyday of the Yiddish-language recording industry in the 1910s and 1920s in New York.

== Biography ==
He was born on April 13, 1868, in Pinsk, Minsk Governorate, Russian Empire (now located in Belarus). His mother died during his birth, and he was raised by a stepmother; his father Yehuda Leyb Smulewitz was a cantor. He later said that he had an extremely difficult childhood. Solomon sang in his chorus from the age of 5. When his father died seven years later, Solomon went into the tailoring trade while still singing in cantorial choirs in exchange for his meals. He left to join the chorus of a traveling theater troupe and was very successful in girls' roles. After being left behind in an inn as a mashkn (a pledge that the others would come back and pay their bill), he went back to the cantor in Pinsk but was thrown out. He became a street singer.

He wrote his first song at the age of 12: The Desolate Orphan, an autobiographical plaint. Having learned Russian, he sang and played the fiddle from town to town, finally settling in Minsk, where he became a successful badchen, also writing songs for other local wedding singers. He wrote for Shomer's play productions in Warsaw. He published his first book in 1891.

He emigrated to the United States, to England, and then back to the United States again. He was embraced by some of the leading figures of the New York Yiddish Theatre, including Jacob P. Adler and David Kessler. He began to write many one-act plays, which became quite popular. In America, he toured singing his own songs, which eventually totalled around 500 (in a letter to the press, he claimed 300 written to his own melodies and 200 sets to melodies by others). The most famous were A brivele der mamen, Dos talesl, Al tashlicheinu, Khave, and Dos blumenkrentzele, which became well known both in America and Europe and became so widely sung that they were thought to be folk songs.

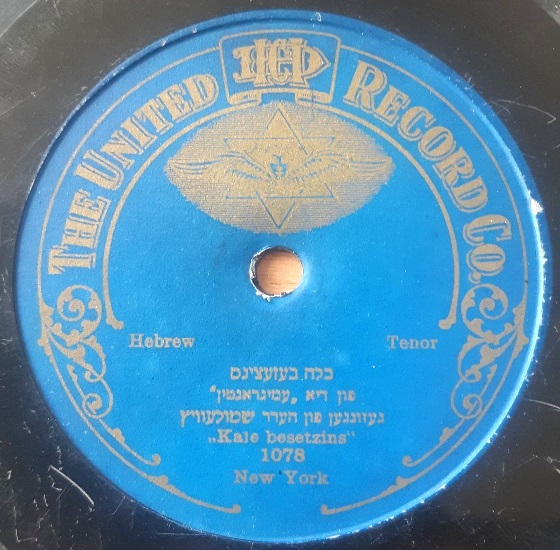

From 1905 to 1909, he issued a yearly collection of his lyrics called "Der teater zinger." In 1916, he published "Poeziye un lider." His 500-page autobiography was never published. His song "Khave" was so popular the famous Russian singer Feodor Chaliapin included it in his repertoire. He was a prolific recording artist.

Smulewitz had a strong and piercing tenor voice which suited early recording capabilities well; after 1920 both his manner of singing and style of composition went out of fashion. Smulewitz fell on hard times and, to make a living, continuously toured the United States and Canada from Halifax to Calgary and Winnipeg, often with his daughter Dorothy, without much success.

He died on January 1, 1943, in New York.

He had five children, Berr Smulewitz (b. 1877), Aaron (b. 1902), Springer (b. 1903), Dorothy (b. 1912), and Ida (b. 1913).
