= Louis Friedsell =

Clay killer

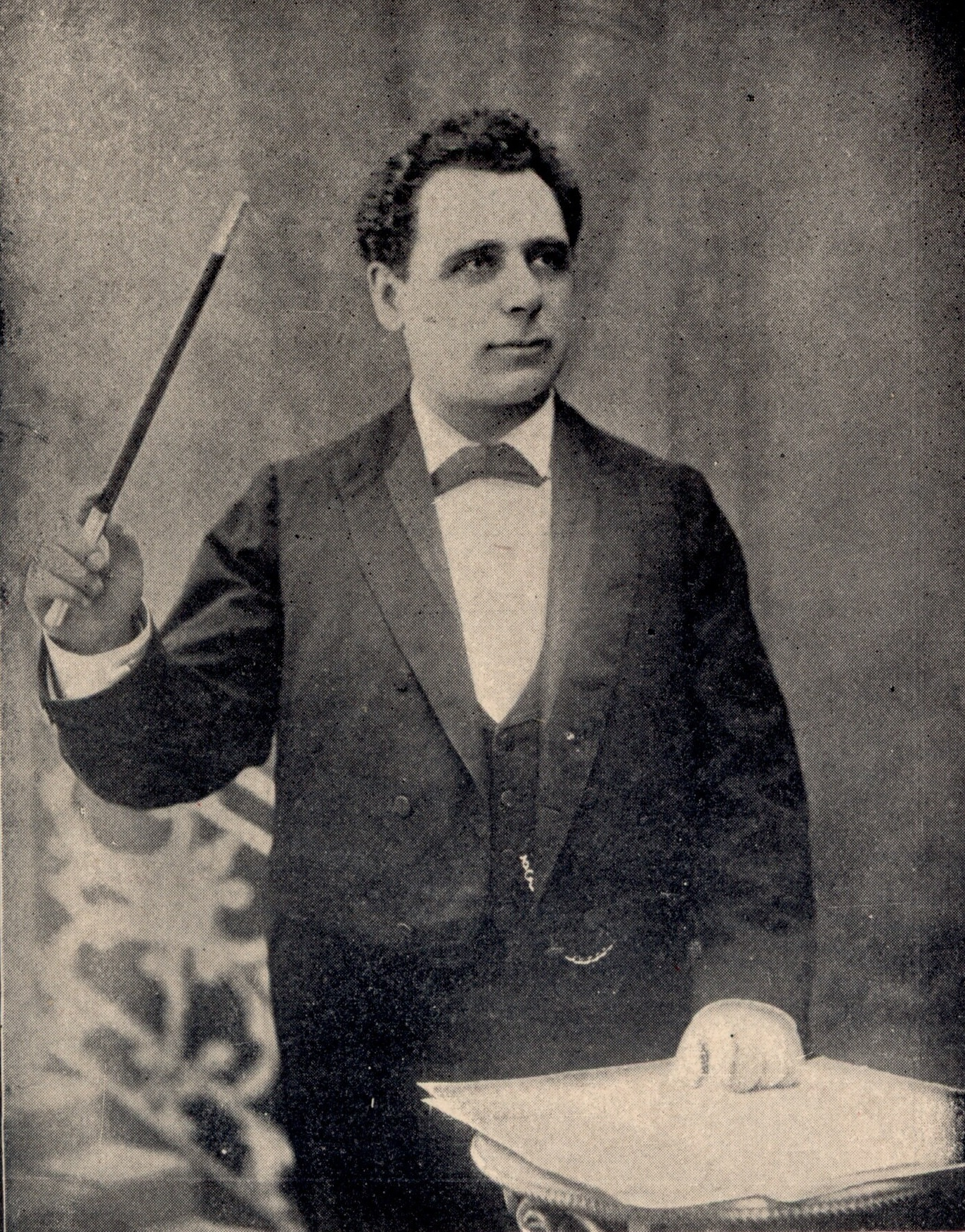
- Friedsell in 1900
- Born: 1863 or 1865; Yekaterinoslav, Yekaterinoslav Governorate, Russian Empire
- Died: June 25, 1923; New York, New York, United States

Louis Friedsell (born 1863 or 1865 - 1923) was a conductor and composer for the Yiddish theatre.

== Life ==
Friedsell was born in 1863 or 1865 in Yekaterinoslav in the Russian Empire

He wrote the music for about 150 plays and operettas (partly by himself, partly with other music writers). Many of his songs were written for historical operettas and comedies. As a conductor he made at least eleven recordings for the United Hebrew Disc and Cylinder Company.

He died June 25, 1923, in New York City, United States.

== Works ==
- Goldene Madina
