= Herman Wohl =

Jewish–American composer (1877–1936)

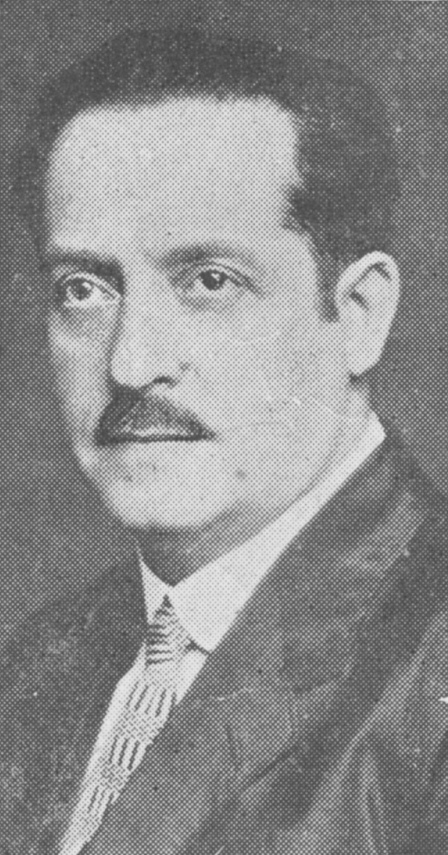
Wohl in 1922

Herman Wohl (Yiddish: הערמאַן װאָהל; 1877–1936) was a Jewish–American composer closely associated with the American Yiddish Theatre.

== Galicia ==
Wohl was born in Otyniia near Stanislavov (now called Ivano-Frankivsk) in eastern Galicia, now Ukraine. He was raised in a Chasidic home and studied with cantors from the age of 9. He soon began composing, directing choirs, and singing as a Hazzan himself. At the age of 16 he joined Kalman Juvelier's troupe in Galicia, acting, singing in the chorus, and writing songs for their repertoire.

== America ==
In 1896 he was brought to America to teach; he soon began writing for several theater troupes. He partnered with Aaron (Arnold) Perlmutter and over the course of 16 years they wrote music for many operettas including Mezinke, Bnei Israel, Yakov un Esau, and dozens of others by Moshe Hurwitz (Horowitz), Anshel Shor's Di Almoneh (The Widow) and A mentsh zol men zayn (One should be a decent person) also Motashevski's Dos Pintele Yid, Di neshomah fun mayn folk, and Di Poylishe Khasene.

Working with Edelstein in the People's Theater, he composed music to

- Mikhl Goldberg's musical comedy Gelebt un gelakht (Lived and laughed)
- Adam Mesko's operetta Di nakht fun libe (The night of love)
- Boris Thomashefsky's Dos Heylike lid (The holy song)
- Itskhok Lesh's Yoshke Kvat, 1921
- Israel Rozenberg's Yankl Litvak
- Tomashevski's Lebedik un freylekh and Thousand and One Nights
- William Siegel's Dem rebbin's zindl and Di galitsianer khasene (The Galitsian wedding)
- Israel Rozenberg's Di galitsianer rebetsin

Some of his hundreds of songs, most composed with Arnold Perlmutter, are listed at Florida Atlantic University's website:

- A bisele erd (A little bit of ground) 1911
- A kind is dos glik oyf der velt (A Child Is The World's Happiness) 1917
- A pintele Yid (often translated as Quintessential Jew, regarded as one of the most classic bar-mitzvah songs) 1909
- Az du kenst nit un veyst nit nemt men zikh nit under (If you can't do it and don't know, don't undertake it) 1911
- Bist mayn matonele (You're my little gift) 1907
- Dorf's meydl (Village Maiden) 1911
- Dos is di libe fun yankele mit rokhlen (This is the love of Jacob and Rachel) from Galitsianer khasene
- Emese yidishe harts (A True Jewish Heart) 1906
- Goles lid (Song Of The Diaspora) 1921
- Hersher is der man (The Husband Is The Ruler) 1910
- Leben zol Kolumbus (Long Live Columbus) 1915
- Mayn libster fraynd iz mayn mamenyu (My Most Loving Friend Is My Mother) 1921
- Men hoydet zikh in Amerike (They're Dancing in America) 1908
- Meydele vest nokh gliklekh zayn (Maiden, You'll Yet Be happy) (with Jennie Goldstein)
- Tsveyte Vayb (Second Wife) 1910
- Vayber, makh mir far president (Women, Make Me President) 1910
- Yeder eyner straykt atsind (Everybody is Striking Now) 1919

Besides being a Second Avenue songwriter and composer in the Yiddish Theater District, Wohl continued to work as a synagogue choirmaster and liturgical composer. For many years he conducted the choir for the most widely acclaimed and revered cantor of the time—and probably of all time—Yossele Rosenblatt. His many cantorial-choral compositions for Sabbath, High Holy Days, and Festivals remain in manuscript, and the whereabouts of many of these are not even known. He died in 1936.

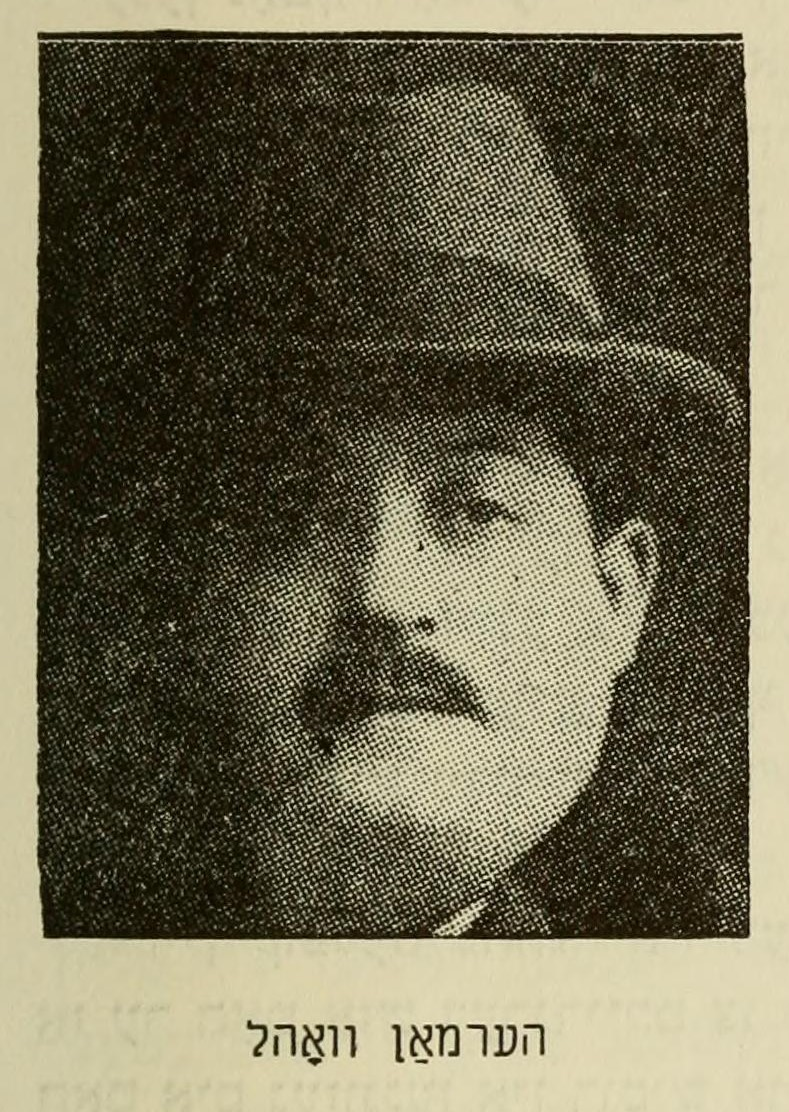
Herman Wohl, composer
