= Annetta (given name) =

- Gender: female

Other names
- See also: Anna

Annetta is a variant of the feminine given name Anna. Notable people with the name include:

- Annetta Carter (1907–1991), American botanist
- Annetta R. Chipp (1866–1961), American temperance leader and prison evangelist
- Annetta Grodner, Ukrainian singer, actress, and Yiddish theatre performer
- Annetta Kapon, Greek artist
- Annetta W. Peck (1871–1958), American hard-of-hearing community leader
- Annetta Johnson Saint-Gaudens (1869–1943), American sculptor
- Annetta Schwartz, Yiddish theatre performer
