= Moses Horowitz =

American playwright and actor (1844–1910)

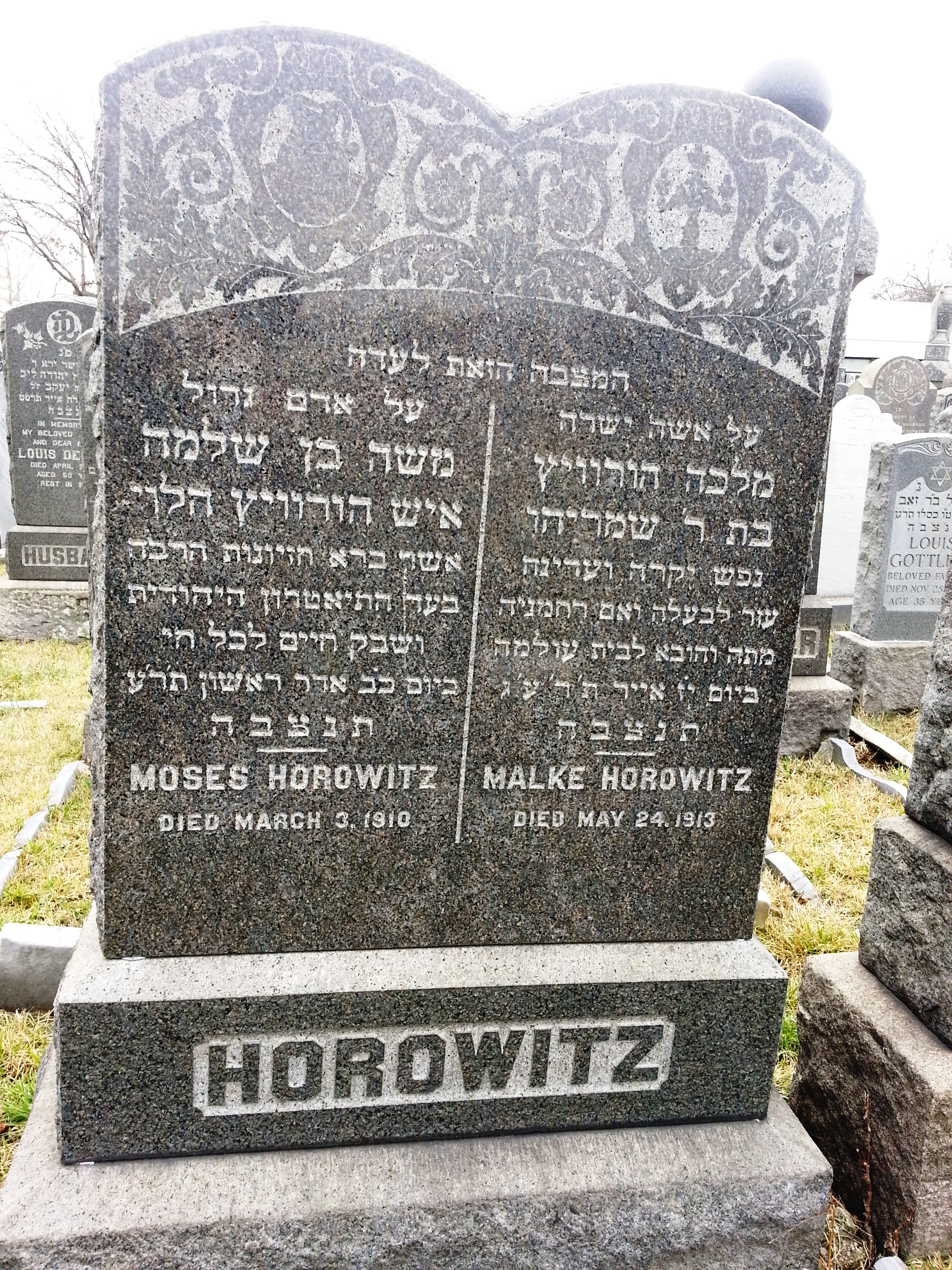
Gravestone of the playwright Moses Horowitz

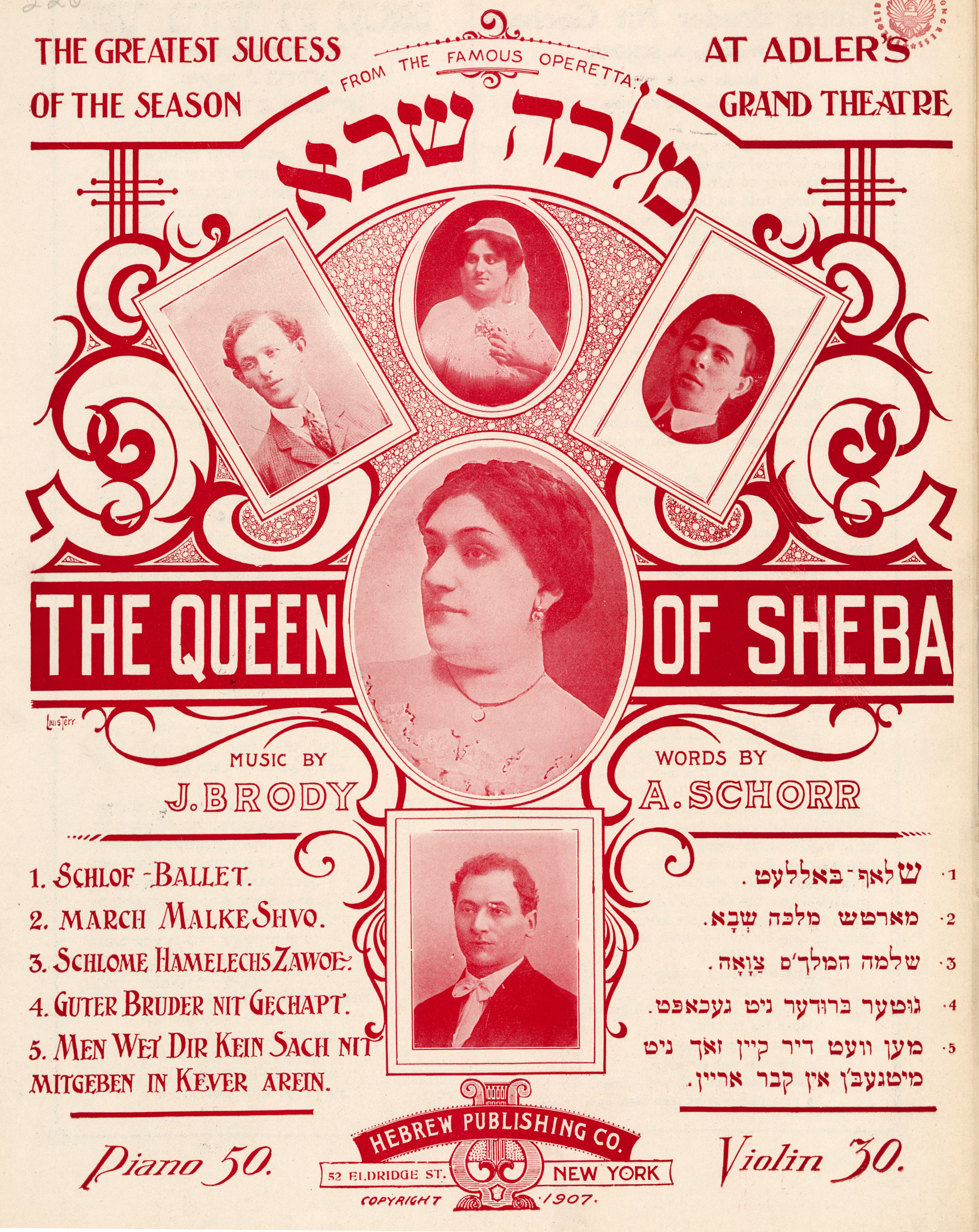
1907 Moyshe Hurwitz show Malke Shvo (The Queen of Sheba)

Moses Ha-Levi Horowitz (February 27, 1844 – March 4, 1910), also known as Moishe Hurvitz, Moishe Isaac Halevy-Hurvitz, etc., was a playwright and actor in the early years of Yiddish theater. Jacob Adler describes him as an "authorit[y] on dramaturgy", but also remarks that before being part of the Yiddish theater in London in the mid-1880s he had "wandered in different lands, involved himself in various undertakings, and then moved on often leaving, it is said not altogether pleasant memories behind him." He was one of the few figures in the early years of Yiddish theater who did not participate in the boom years in Imperial Russia (1879–1883).

Famous for the speed with which he turned out his plays (usually in no more than three days), he would sometimes start actors rehearsing the first two acts of a play while he wrote the third backstage.

== Life ==
Horowitz was born in Stanislau, eastern Galicia (then a province of Austria-Hungary, now in Ukraine). He received the usual Jewish education, and also studied German. At age eighteen, he became a Hebrew teacher in Iaşi, Romania, before moving to Bucharest, where he became director of a Jewish school, a position from which he was dismissed, after which he converted from Judaism to Christianity and became a missionary. He later claimed to have served as professor of geography at the University of Bucharest.

In Romania in 1877, he converted back to Judaism and, having been turned down as a playwright by Goldfaden, who wrote all of his own company's plays, Horowitz (along with Joseph Lateiner) began to write plays for Israel Grodner and Sigmund Mogulesko after they left Goldfaden's troupe. A favorite of Bucharest intellectuals, he was at that time known for historical dramas, sometimes with improvised monologues (especially for his own roles); he was initially seen as a more serious playwright than Goldfaden, who at this time was writing vaudevilles, light operetta, and the occasional melodrama. Goldfaden's work would soon take a more serious turn, while Horowitz eventually became "a 'specialist' in the 'shund' (lowbrow) genre.".

Horowitz soon put together a troupe of his own, including actor Abba Schoengold, with which he toured eastern Romania. He went to New York City either in 1884 or at the end of 1886, taking with him a company of his own. At the Roumanian Opera House, he presented Tisa Eslar, oder, Di Farshverung, a play he had already written in Romania about the 1882 blood libel trial in the Hungarian town of Tiszaeszlar; he also produced a sequel, Der Protses in Tisa Eslar ("The trial in Tiszaeszlar"). One of these plays was still being produced as late as 1913, in Iaşi.

He wrote no less than 169 plays, Das Polishe Yingel being his first dramatic production. According to the Jewish Encyclopedia, among his more successful plays are: Schlome Chochom, Kuzri, Chochmath Noshim, Ben Hador, and Jizius Mizrujym. Israil Bercovici also singles out his Sabbatai Zvi and Tragedy of Tisza-Eszlar, both from 1884. Most of Horowitz's plays were historical, but he also wrote "zeit piessen" on topical subjects, such as a play about the Homestead Strike of 1892, one about a 1903 pogrom in Chişinău, and a distinctly socialist take on the 1889 Johnstown flood written while working with Boris Thomashefsky in Chicago. The most successful of his "zeit piessen" was Tissa Eslar. Many of his dramas were composed in the course of a few days, and he utilized without hesitation whole scenes of foreign dramas. Though a successful playwright, Horowitz failed as an actor, and after he went to America he abandoned acting entirely.

At one time quite wealthy and "the best-dressed man on the Lower East Side," he died poor. After the success of his 1904 play Ben Hador, he lost all of his money on an unsuccessful venture in 1905 to present grand opera in Yiddish at the Windsor Theatre, on the Bowery; shortly after that, he was stricken with paralysis, and lived out his last years in the Montefiore Home, provided for by his friends. He died in Montefiore, and was buried in Washington Cemetery in Brooklyn, New York.
