= Khosn kale mazel tov =

Yiddish song by Sigmund Mogulesko

Song
- Language: Yiddish
- English title: "Congratulations to the Bride and Groom"
- Written: 1894
- Published: 1909
- Composer: Sigmund Mogulesko
- Lyricist: Sigmund Mogulesko

"Khosn kale mazel tov" (Yiddish: חתן כלה מזל טוב, English: "Groom, Bride, Congratulations" or "Congratulations to the Bride and Groom") is a popular Yiddish song written by Sigmund Mogulesko in the USA in 1894. Originally written for the theater, the song and its tune became popular at Jewish weddings, a staple in 20th century vaudeville, in Klezmer repertoire, and in cartoons. Sometimes titled as "Mazel Tov" or other variations, it "passed into general knowledge as a folk song without mention of its author".

== History ==
"Khosn kale mazel tov" was written by composer and actor Sigmund Mogulesko (1858 – 1914) for Joseph Lateiner's Yiddish language operetta Blihmele (English: "Little Flower"). Blihmele premiered in 1894 at the Windsor Theatre, New York City. Lateiner's libretto was published in 1903. Mogulesko was a "beloved performer who often concluded theatrical presentations with his "signature" tune."

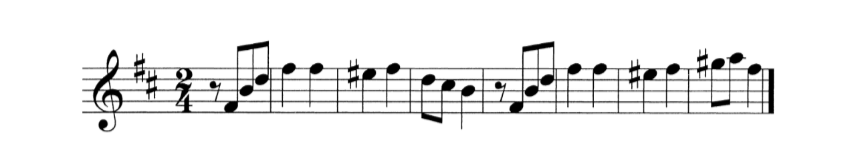
Main melody of "Khosn kale mazel tov".

In 1905 the Edison Military Band (possibly Israel J. Hochman and orchestra) released "Masil toff" an instrumental version of "Khosn kale mazel tov", issued by Edison Records (Edison Gold Moulded Record: 18827). The Edison Phonographic Monthly of February 1905 credits the tune to "Moguleski", and the recording as one of its many "Hebrew selections".

Cover image of 1909 piano music for Blihmele including "Choson Kale Mazl Tov"

A 1909 sheet music edition of Blihmele proclaimed that "The most popular Jewish opera" had been "Performed over one thousand times in America & Europe". In 1910 Blihmele was performed at Thomashefsky's People's Theatre, New York.

In the early 20th century Yiddish popular music was thriving in vaudeville and beyond. Klezmer scholar Henry Sapoznik wrote that the song was such a hit in New York that it became known "as the clearly identified Jewish Tune."

The song was popular enough in the 1920s and '30s that it was used in early American cartoons as part of "Jewish characterizations", such as those which appear in Disney's Mickey Mouse shorts The Opry House (1929) and Pioneer Days (1930). Other interpolations of the tune occur in the cartoons Bosko, the Talk-Ink Kid (Harman-Ising, 1929), Laundry Blues (Fables Pictures, 1930), The New Car (Iwerks, 1931) and Betty Boop's Big Boss (Fleischer, 1934). It was also quoted in Eddie Cantor's 1920 recording of "Lena from Palesteena", and Spike Jones' 1942 recording of "The Sheik of Araby".

In 1921 American Klezmer clarinetist Harry Kandel recorded his own instrumental arrangement titled "Choosin kalle mazeltov" on the Victor label.

In 1946 American Klezmer clarinetist Dave Tarras recorded a swing arrangement of "Khosn kale mazel tov" under the title "Good Luck (Mozel tuf)", credited as a traditional tune.

In 1948, following the Israeli Declaration of Independence, Al Jolson recorded a tribute song titled "Israel" with English lyrics. Credited to Jolson and Benee Russell, and "based on an old Hebrew Folk melody", the tune is actually Mogulesko's "Khosn kale mazel tov".

Popular Australian comedian Roy Rene, as the vaudeville character "Mo", used "Khosn kale mazel tov" as his theme tune in the radio segment McCackie Mansion (1947-1953).

In Paris in the 1950s the Peters Sisters recorded a swing version in French titled "Mazel Tov", conducted by Jacques-Henry Rys.

In the late 1950s or early 1960s international vaudeville performers Henri Gerro and Rosita Londner, recorded "Chusn-Kaly Mazltov" in Paris.

The song appears in the 1967 musical Thoroughly Modern Millie sung by Julie Andrews as part of the "Jewish Wedding Song (Trinkt Le Chaim)", credited as "traditional".

The tune appears on the soundtrack of the 2007 German film Vier Minuten performed by accordionist Enrique Ugarte.

"Khosn kale mazel tov" is a staple of Klezmer bands and Jewish wedding music worldwide, often serving as an uplifting, high-energy instrumental dance tune.
