= Grodner =

Grodner is a surname meaning "someone from the city of Grodno", in Belarus. Notable people with the surname include:

- Allison Grodner, American director, producer and writer
- Annetta Grodner, Ukrainian Jewish singer and actress, the first prima donna in Yiddish theater
- Israel Grodner (1848–1887), one of the founding performers in Yiddish theater
- Zygmunt Grodner (1932–2020), Polish fencer

== See also ==
- Of Grodno or Grodner, toponymic epithet
