= Grand Theatre (Manhattan) =

Former theater in Manhattan, New York

Coordinates: 40.718184°N 73.99386°W

- Adler's Grand Theatre; New Grand Theatre
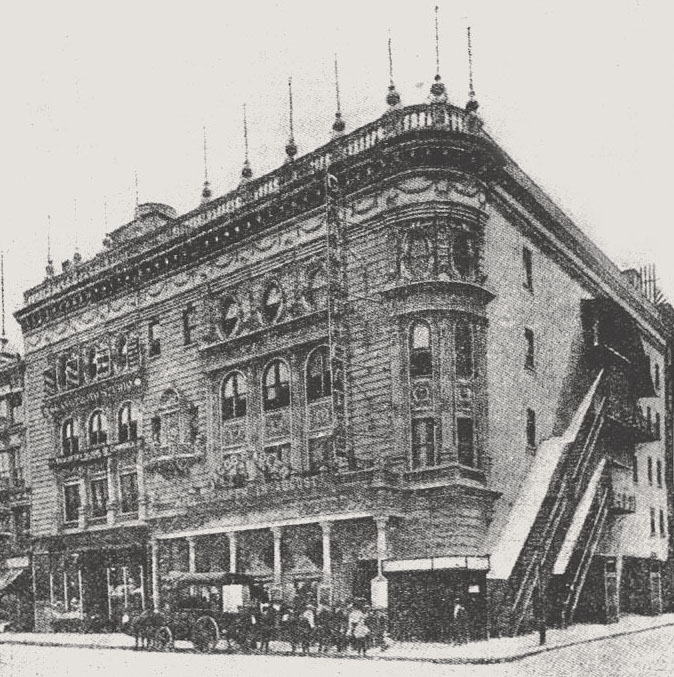
- The Grand Theatre, some time before 1906
- Interactive map of Grand Theatre
- Address: 255 Grand Street, at Chrystie Street; New York City

Construction
- Opened: February 5, 1903
- Closed: 1930
- Architect: Victor Hugo Koehler

The Grand Theatre was a theatre in the Yiddish Theatre District in Manhattan in New York City built for Yiddish productions, the first of its kind. The theater was built in 1904 by Jacob Pavlovitch Adler, a famous Russian-born Jewish actor.

== Background ==
On March 12, 1902, Sophia Karp, with Harry Fischel and playwright Joseph Lateiner, founded the Grand Theatre in New York City. The city's first theatre built specifically for Yiddish productions, the Grand was typical of Yiddish theatres of the time by being largely artist-managed. Besides Karp and Lateiner, the directors included leading man Morris Finkel, comedian Bernard Bernstein, L. S. Gottlieb, and composer Louis Friedsell. It opened on February 5, 1903.

Two events in 1904 symbolized the decline of the serious stage. Jacob Gordin failed as the director of his own theater and Jacob Adler, the leading exponent of Gordin's dramas, opened the Grand Theater – the first structure built specifically for the Yiddish stage. In 1912 T[h]omashefsky's new National Theater on Houston Street even surpassed the Grand in the magnificence of its appointments. The National compared favorably with Broadway palaces and offered similar enjoyments subject to the same commercial will-o'-the-wisp.

Italian performances also were done at the theatre.

The theatre was demolished in 1930 to make way for Sara D. Roosevelt Park.

== See also ==
- Yiddish theatre
