= Isidore Solotorefsky =

American Yiddish playwright

Isidore Solotorefsky, also Isidore Zolotarevsky (Yiddish: איזידאר זאלאטארעווסקי) (Note: His last name was transliterated with various combinations of letters Z/s, o/a, v/f. His first name is also given as Isaac, Yitzhak, Yitskhok, etc.) (December 27, 1873 (Note: Sources give the year of birth either 1873 or 1875) – 28 November 28, 1946) was a prolific Jewish American playwright, who wrote plays for Yiddish theatre. During about 50 years he authored over 100 plays, many of which had a box office success. Only several of his plays were printed, and the Yiddish troupes used handwritten copies.

== Biography ==
Zolotarevsky was born in Yelizavetgrad, Russian Empire (now Kropyvnytskyi in Ukraine). He grew up in an assimilated environment and did not take any Jewish studies. In 1890 he emigrated to the United States and after some odd jobs he started to act professionally. He used to translate theatre songs from English to Yiddish and back, and in 1895 he eventually wrote his first play, Der farfaser (The Author).

== Notable plays ==
=== Der yeshiva bokher ===
Zalmen Zylbercweig's Lexicon writes that "in 1897 in Philadelphia, there was staged with Louis Friedsell's music Y. Zolotarefsky's play "Der yidisher hamlet" by Boris Thomashefsky, under the name Di shvarts khupe, oder, Der yidishe martirer ("The Black Khupe or Jewish Martyr"), which later became popular in the Yiddish theatre world under the name Der yeshiva bukher. However in another place the Lexicon tells the story slightly differently: "In the same year of 1897, he also wrote his melodrama, "The Jewish Hamlet," which in the same evening was staged in Philadelphia (with Max Rosenthal (Note: This Max Rosenthal) as "Avigdorl"), and in New York in the Windsor Theatre, where S[olotorefsky] performed as an actor. Here the play was staged through Thomashefsky under the name "Di shvarts khupe, oder, Di yidishe martirer," music by Friedsell."

In 1914 it was reprinted in Warsaw without author's knowledge under the title דער ישיבה בחור (אדער, דער יידישער האמלעט) (Der Yeshiva Bocher, oder der Yiddisher Hamlet, Yeshiva Student, or A Jewish Hamlet).

==== Plot ====
At these times the Yiddish theatre often transformed the plots of Shakespeare, making the characters and the circumstances Jewish, sometimes with humorous comment "fartaytsht un farbessert" ("translated and improved"). Der yeshiva bokher is an operetta that retells Hamlet in the Jewish setting. Avigdorl (a Yiddish pet name for Avigdor), a yeshiva student returns home and finds that his father, a Hasidic rabbi, had died six weeks ago and that his mother was about to marry his uncle, who is the next rabbi. Avigdorl also finds father's letter that says that his mother and uncle had an affair. The play ends with the death of Avigdorl after a long argument with the new rabbi. The Jewish Virtual Library says "a wicked uncle smears rabbinic candidate’s reputation by calling him a nihilist and the young man dies of a broken heart."
