= Opry House =

Opry House may refer to:

- Grand Ole Opry House, broadcast location of the Grand Ole Opry
- The Opry House, 1929 American animated short film
