= Berta Gersten =

Polish-born American actress (1893–1972)

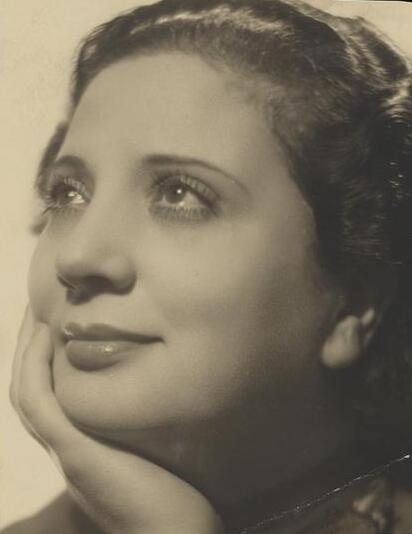
- Gersten, c. 1925
- Born: Berta Gerstenman; August 20, 1893; Kraków, Grand Duchy of Kraków, Austria-Hungary (now Poland)
- Died: September 10, 1972 (aged 79); Montefiore Hospital, New York City, New York, US
- Occupation: actor
- Known for: Yiddish theatre
- Spouse: Irwin H. Fenn (m. 1911; died 1960)
- Children: 1
- Relatives: Annetta Schwartz (mother-in-law); Moishe Finkel (brother-in-law)

Berta Gersten (née Gerstenman; August 20, 1892 – September 10, 1972), was a Polish-American Yiddish theatre and film actress. In 1954, Gersten made her English-language film debut in The Benny Goodman Story and her Broadway debut in The Flowering Peach.

== Biography ==
Gersten was born Berta Gerstenman on August 20, 1893 (Note: Also cited as 1892, 1894 and 1896.) in Kraków, Grand Duchy of Kraków (present-day Poland) to Orthodox Jewish parents Abraham Gerstenman (Note: Also cited as Avrom.), a religious and Hebrew teacher, and Mesha Gerstenman (née Timberg).

In 1899, the family immigrated to New York City where Gersten's father worked as a courthouse translator and her mother as a dressmaker for actresses. Her acting debut happened because her mother was working for an actor who needed a child for a production. In 1918 she was recruited by Maurice Schwartz's Yiddish Art Theatre troup performing notable Yiddish works and dramatic classics like Chekhov Ibsen and Shakespeare in Yiddish. Stayed with the theatre for 25 years frequently in leading roles with Jacob Ben-Ami.

A film adaptation of the play Mirele Efros was made in the United States in 1939. It was directed by Josef Berne with Gersten in the title role and Ruth Elbaum as Shaindl. It was made in Yiddish with English subtitles.

Gersten acted in Yiddish plays, but in 1954 she took a role in an English-speaking play "The World of Sholom Aleichem" on Broadway. She was known for acting in the theatre, but she played Benny's mother in the 1956 film The Benny Goodman Story. This was her only Hollywood film appearance. Other significant Broadway productions of The Flowering Peach (1955), A Majority of One (1959), and Sophie (1963) included Gersten in the cast. Her lasting acting role was in My Father's Court in 1971.

== Death and legacy ==
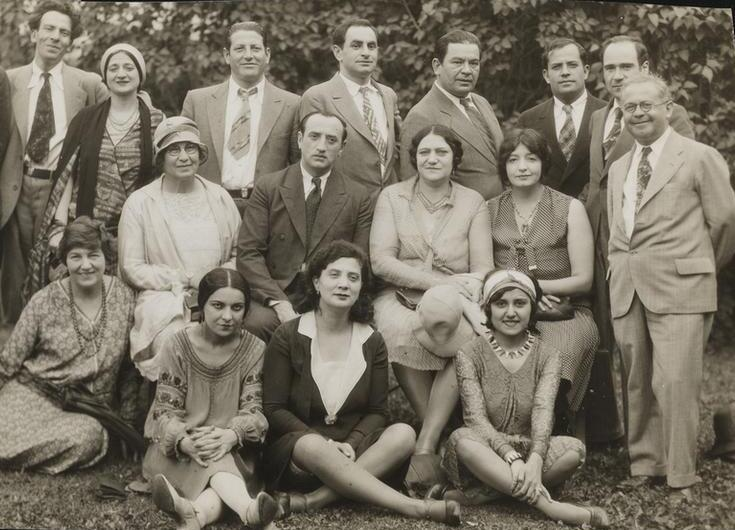
Berta Gersten with the Yiddish Art Theatre troupe in London in 1935

On July 10, 1911 Gersten married to Irwin H. Fenn (né Isaac Hershel Finkel; died 1960), a professor of mathematics and physics at Brooklyn Polytechnic Institute. The couple had one son, the photojournalist Albert Fenn. Gersten was the daughter-in-law of the Yiddish theater actress Annetta Schwartz and Moishe Finkel, an actor, theatre director and manager.

During the last years of her life Gersten lived with Ben-Ami. On September 10, 1972 Gersten died at Montefiore Hospital. Gersten is included in the 1971 work Notable American Women, 1607–1950; A Biographical Dictionary.

== Stage and screen ==
=== Screen ===
Year	Title	Role	Notes	Ref.
1932	Yiskor			
1938	A Brivele der mamen			
1939	Mirele Efros	Mirele Efros		
1950	God, Man and Devil	Pesye		
1954	The Benny Goodman Story	Dora Goodman	English-language film debut	

=== Stage ===
Year	Title	Role	Venue	Notes	Ref.
1954–1955	The Flowering Peach	Esther	Belasco Theatre		
1959–1960	A Majority of One		Shubert Theatre (1959); Ethel Barrymore Theatre (1959–1960)	Understudy for Gertrude Berg	
1963	Sophie	Mama	Winter Garden Theatre	Based on the life of Sophie Tucker	
1971	My Father's Court				
