= Zolotarevsky =

Zolotarevsky Zolotarevskaya is a Russian-language surname. Notable people with the surname include:

- Isaac Zolotarevsky (1906-1973), Soviet satirist writer, poet, translator
- Isidore Zolotarevsky or Isidore Solotorefsky (1873–1946), American Yiddish playwright
- Isidor Zolotarevsky (1885-1961), Russian and Soviet architect, sculptor
- Nikolay Zolotarevsky (1910-1981), Soviet military engineer-constructor, colonel general, Hero of Socialist Labor
