= Sophia Karp =

Romanian actress and soprano (1861–1904)

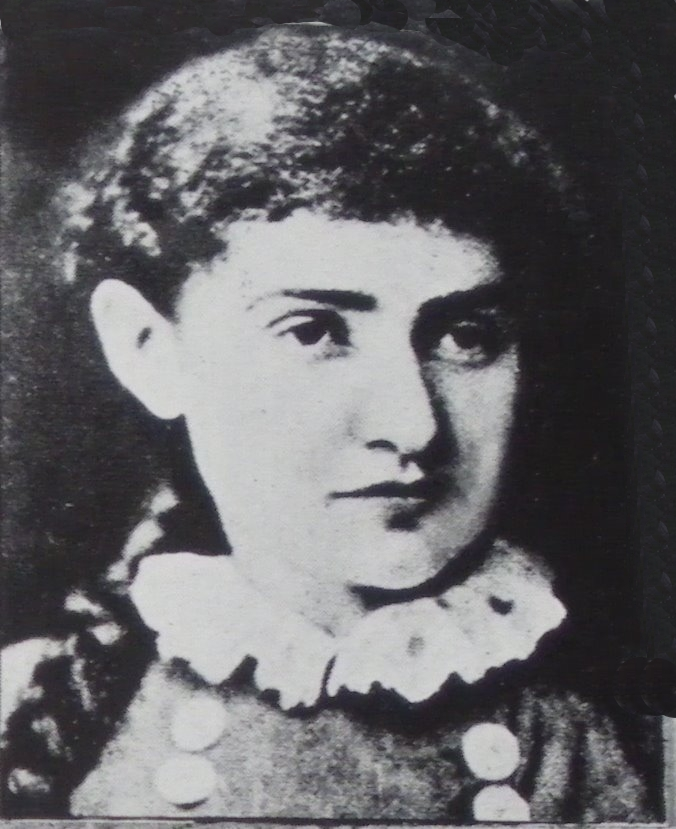
Karp, 1880s

Sophia Karp (born Sara Segal; 1861– March 31, 1904), also known as Sophie Goldstein, Sofia Carp, and Sophie Karp, was a Romanian-born Jewish actress and soprano, the first professional Yiddish theater actress.

== Life and career ==
Karp was a 16-year-old in her native Galaţi when the theater troupe formed roughly six months earlier by Abraham Goldfaden — at that time, the world's only professional Yiddish language theater troupe — arrived in town in the winter of 1876–1877. The troupe consisted of three men (Goldfaden, Israel Grodner, and Sokher Goldstein); they had collaborated with various other actors and musicians in their previous performances in Iaşi and Botoşani, but up to this point they had all been men, even for the female roles.

When she played the granddaughter in the Goldfaden troupe's Galați premiere, Die Bobe mit'n Enikel (Grandmother and Granddaughter), the young Sara Segal, at that time a seamstress, became the first professional Yiddish theater actress. Her mother, however, after attending that premiere objected to her daughter appearing on a stage. The stagestruck Sara obeyed her mother, but had been thoroughly bitten by the theatrical bug. The only expedient was to marry one of the players, and since Goldfaden and Grodner were both already married, the only expedient was to marry Goldstein (and to change her first name to the more "glamorous" Sophie).

The Jewish Encyclopedia (1901-1906) says that she "won distinction in [Goldfaden's] dramas and operas". She would remain in Yiddish theater for the rest of her life, following Goldfaden and Goldstein to Bucharest, Odessa (where she would star at the Mariinsky Theater in 1881) and through Imperial Russia until Yiddish theater was banned in Russia in 1883, then playing in Galicia, in Berlin, and in other locations in Germany, and then back to Romania, where she settled for a while with a theater company in Iași where, after Sokher Goldstein's death (of tuberculosis, according to Rosenfeld) she married another actor, Max Karp; her great fame as a prima donna was achieved as Sophia Karp. She was noted for her portrayal of Judith in Karl Gutzkow's play Uriel Acosta and of Benvolio in Shakespeare's Romeo and Juliet.

On March 12, 1902, along with Jacob Fischel and playwright Joseph Lateiner, she founded the Grand Theater in New York. The city's first purpose-built Yiddish theater, the Grand was typical of Yiddish theaters of the time by being largely artist-managed. Besides Karp and Lateiner, the directors included leading man Morris Finkel, comedian Bernard Bernstein, and composer Louis Friedsell; Fischel and L.S. Gottlieb were the only non-artist directors.

Karp contracted pneumonia and died at the age of 42 or 43 in New York.

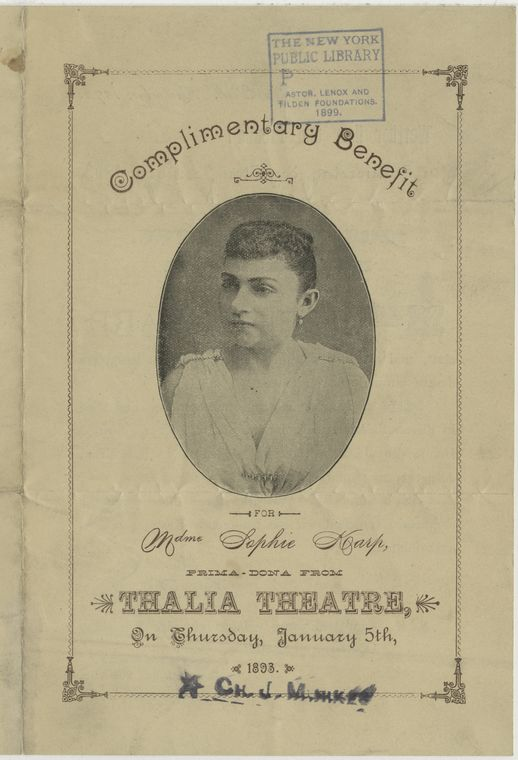
Sophia Karp, 1893

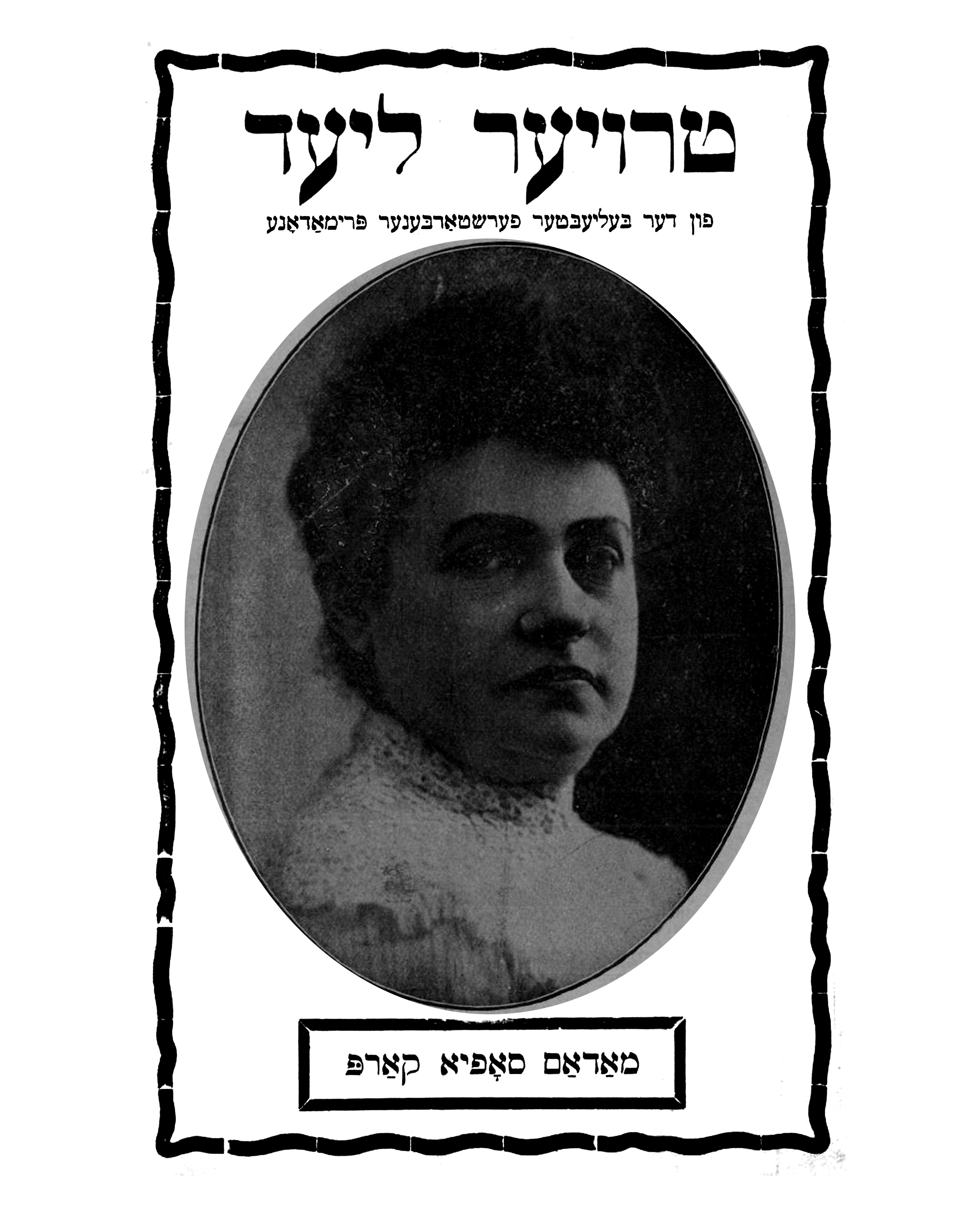
Troyer Lid (sad song), a eulogy published after her death
