= Rosita Londner =

Argentinian Jewish actor and singer

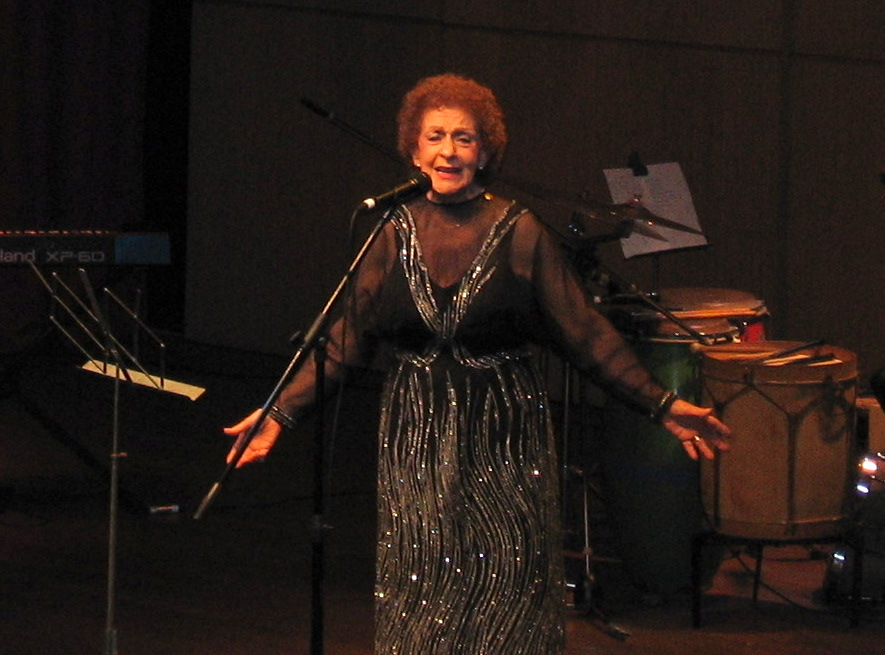
- Born: Raisla Londner; August 17, 1923; Warsaw, Poland
- Died: August 8, 2014 (aged 90); Buenos Aires, Argentina
- Occupations: Singer & Actress
- Years active: 1947 - 2003
- Spouse: Henri Gerro
- Children: Mario Rojzman, Alicia Saientz

Rosita Londner (born Raisla; August 17, 1923 - August 8, 2014) was an Argentine actress and singer, with a popular career in Jewish theater and Jewish music. Londner, and her stage partner and husband Henri Gerro, were nicknamed "the wandering stars of vaudeville and the Jewish music hall."

== Early years ==
Born in Warsaw, Poland on August 17, 1923, Londner arrived in Argentina when she was a few months old. Growing up, Londner's home was full of Jewish culture and Jewish music. Her mother, Sore Rojl, sang in a choir led by Maestro Kipnis. Her father, Nojem Londner, studied Piano and Violin with his brothers and sisters. Londner had 1 sister named Ofelia.

When Londner was 4 years old, her father Nojem died in a work accident.

Londner began to sing at an early age and later received singing lessons from the Argentine maestro, Alberto Mario Zecca.

== Personal life ==
Londner married her stage partner, Henri Gerro, in 1953. They had a daughter, Alicia, and a son, Moshe.

After Gerro's death on October 17, 1980, Londner stopped performing. However, this was temporary as Londner stated that Gerro told her in a dream to continue performing.

Londner died on August 8, 2014, in Buenos Aires, Argentina.

== Music career ==
In 1947, Rosita Londner was hired at the Miter Theater, where she performed alongside other artists from the Jewish community such as Ben-Zion Witler, Dina Halperin, Mijl Mijalesco, Shifra Lerer, Dzigan y Schumajer, Jennie Lowitz, and Meier Zelniker.

In 1951 Henri Gerro arrived in Buenos Aires and met Londner, whereupon he became Londner's stage partner. The two ended up marrying in 1953. The artist couple toured around the world, performing in London, Paris, South Africa, Scandinavia, Israel, North America, Central America, and South America, with their vast repertoire of songs, duets and Jewish humor.

Theatrical critics of the time referred to the Gerro-Londner couple as "the wandering stars of vaudeville and the Jewish music hall," adding: "Their performances before the public not only cause deep artistic enjoyment, but also exciting Jewish experience, both in those who long for the past and in those who seek a national identity.

== Film career ==
One of her last jobs was her film debut in the movie Lost Embrace (Spanish: El Abrazo Partido) directed by Daniel Burman, where she played the role of Ariel's grandmother.

== Theater career ==
- Concert with the institutional choir Max Nordau at the Opera Theater of the City of La Plata (2001)
- Yiddish with songs and humor - Tzi Zinguen un Tzi Zugn (1997)
- The Rabbi's Daughter - Dem rebns tojter (1997)
- The Jewish Gauchos (1995)

== Discography ==
- Yiddish Lidele
- Far Dem Seidn Un Dem Einikl
- Lacht Fun Der Welt
- Henri Gerro and Rosita Londner
- Davidl Klezmer
- Chusn-Kaly Mazltov includes "Chusn-Kaly Mazltov".
- Aza Mazl

== Acknowledgments ==
On November 26, 2003, the Department of Culture of the Asociación Mutual Israelita Argentina organized a recognition of the actress and singer Rosita Londner for her transcendental career in Jewish theater, song and music.
