= Annetta Schwartz =

19th-century Yiddish theater performer

Annetta Schwartz was one of the first distinguished female performers in Yiddish theater.

She and her sister Margaretta shared prima donna duties in Abraham Goldfaden's troupe in Romania beginning in 1877. Jacob Adler described her as "respectable" with classical training as singers. He also writes that when they performed in Odessa (now in Ukraine) in the late 1870s, they had Paris dresses of a quality that had never been seen in that city.

She eventually married actor and impresario Moishe Finkel, and came with him to New York City in 1886. She eventually divorced him and went back to Europe. Lulla Rosenfeld writes that we know little about her outside of the "bitter reminiscences" of rival prima donna Bessie Thomashefsky, wife of Boris Thomashefsky.

== Sources ==
- Adler, Jacob P. (1999). A Life on the Stage: A Memoir. Translated by Rosenfeld, Lulla. Knopf. ISBN 978-0-679-41351-6.
- Quint, Alyssa (12 March 2021). The Rise of the Modern Yiddish Theater. Indiana University Press. ISBN 978-0-253-03864-7.
