= Of Grodno =

Toponymic epithet

Of Grodno, Yiddish: Grodner is a toponymic epithet associated the town of Grodno, which gave rise to the surname Grodner. Notable people with this epithet include:

- Alexander Süsskind of Grodno (died in 1794), kabbalist
- David of Grodno (killed in 1326), castellan of Grodno
- Nahum Grodner (1811–1879), preacher and philanthropist
