= Sokher Goldstein =

Yiddish theatre performer (c.1859–1887)

Sokher Goldstein (c. 1859 – 1887), first name also spelled Suher, Soher, Socher, or Sukher, was a singer and actor, one of the founding performers in Yiddish theater. A Jew, presumably of Ukrainian or Romanian origin, nothing is known about his life before Abraham Goldfaden recruited him in Iaşi in 1876 as the second actor after Israel Grodner for what became the first professional Yiddish theater troupe.

Goldstein participated in the performance at Gradina Pomul Verde ("the Green Fruit-Tree Garden") that is often accounted the first professional Yiddish theater performance. Most likely, the piece by Goldfaden that was performed was a semi-improvised vaudeville called Dos Bintl Holts, "The Bundle of Wood". Goldstein participated in a tour with Goldfaden to Botoşani, Galaţi, Brăila, and finally Bucharest, where the troupe settled for about two years.

According to Joel Berkowitz, "[his] boyish face landed him all the women’s roles until the troupe took on its first actress a few months later." [Berkowitz, 2004, 12] That actress was the young Sara Segal, whom he met and married in Galaţi (upon marriage, she took the name Sofia Goldstein; after his death, she remarried and became famous as Sofia Karp). (See Sophia Karp for more about the marriage.)

In Bucharest, he performed for Goldfaden and other theater directors.

He died of tuberculosis. [Adler, 1999, 86 (commentary)]
