= Bessie Thomashefsky =

Ukrainian-American actress and comedian (1873–1962)

- בעסי טהאמאשעווסקי
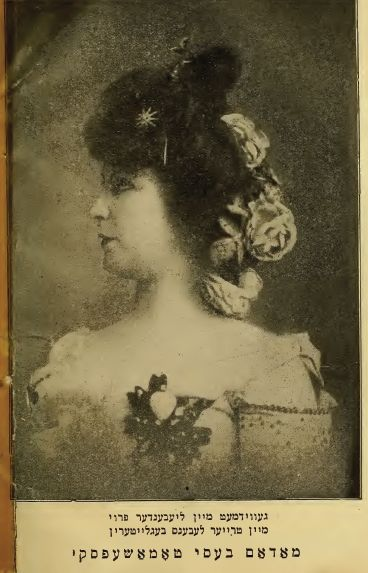
- Born: Briche Baumfeld-Kaufman; 1873; Tarashcha, Kiev Governorate, Russian Empire
- Died: July 6, 1962 (aged 88–89)
- Other name: Bessie Baumfeld-Kaufman
- Occupations: Actress; comedian
- Spouse: Boris Thomashefsky (m. 1891; sep. 1911)
- Children: 4
- Relatives: Michael Tilson Thomas (grandson); Moishe Finkel (brother-in-law)

Bessie Thomashefsky (née Baumfeld-Kaufman; Yiddish: בעסי טהאמאשעווסקי 1873 – July 6, 1962) was a Ukrainian-American Yiddish theater actress and comedian. She was the wife and stage partner of Boris Thomashefsky, the most popular Yiddish leading actor of the era. Probably her most famous role was the title role of Oscar Wilde's Salomé at the People’s Theater in 1908.

== Biography ==
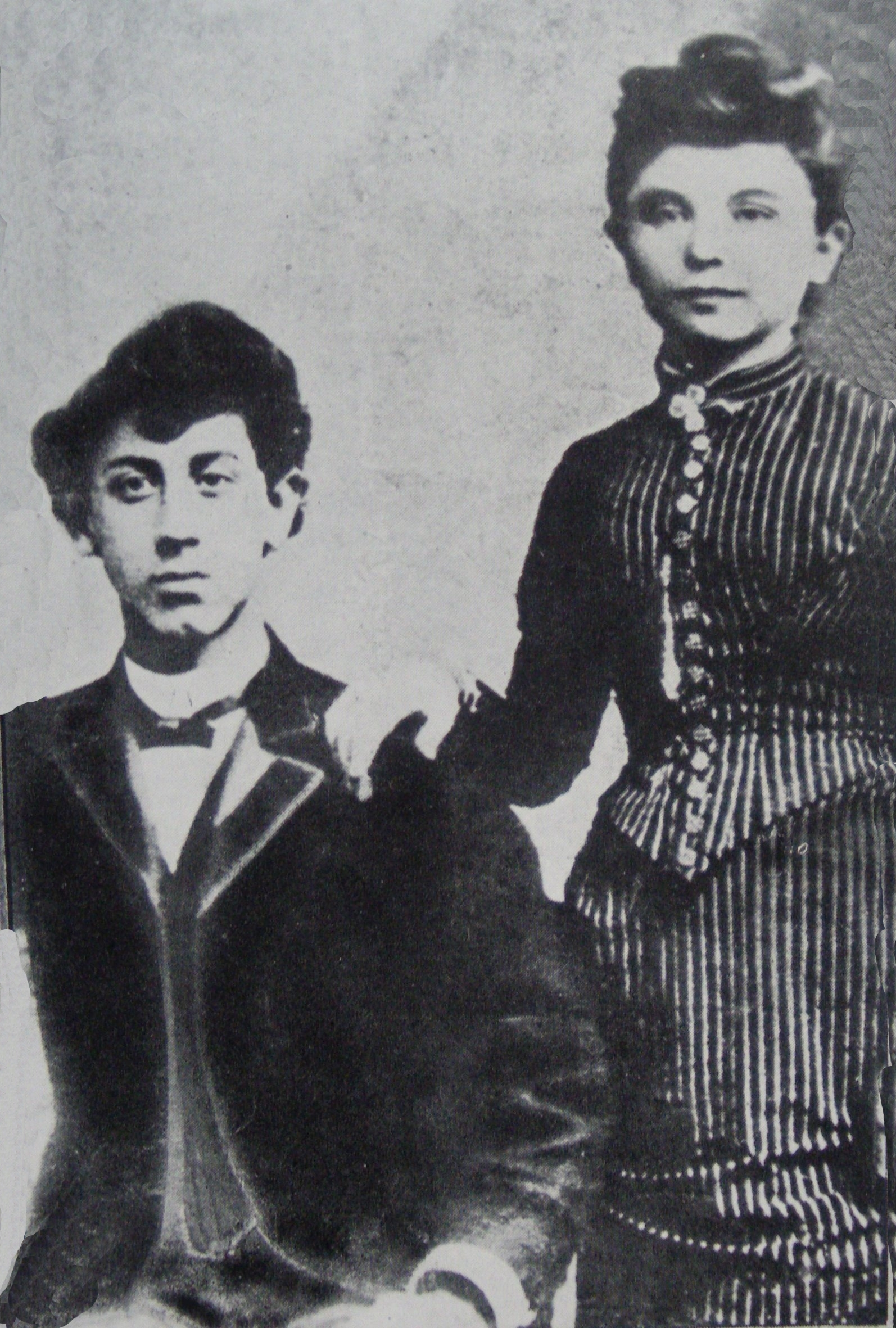
Boris and Bessie Thomashevsky, their engagement photo

Thomashefsky was born Briche Baumfeld-Kaufman (Yiddish: ברוכע בוימפעלד-קויפמאַן) on 1873 in Tarashcha, Kiev Governorate (present-day Ukraine). Her family emigrated to America in 1879 and finally settled in 1883 near Baltimore. She attended school until she was 12 and then went to work in a stocking factory and a sweatshop.

In 1887, 14-year-old Bessie met her future husband when she went backstage at a Baltimore production of עלילות דם, Aliles Dam ("Blood Libel") by a Yiddish touring company to meet the beautiful young "actress" she had seen on stage, only to discover that "she" was the 19-year-old Boris Thomashefsky, and that he was also the manager of the company. In 1888, Bessie ran away from home to join the Thomashefsky Players, and was given an ingenue role starring in Abraham Goldfaden’s Shulamith, which was performed at the Boston Music Hall. Boris moved to romantic male leads.

It was the success of Boris's Greenhorn scripts and Bessie's feature acting in them that led to Bessie being overworked and Boris taking the money and philandering. Bessie wanted an accounting of the money and couldn't find it. Boris Thomashefsky began and carried on a long-term affair with Yiddish actress Regina Zuckerberg (1888-1964). Boris's affair with Regina and financial mismanagement led Boris and Bessie to separate in 1911.

Both Boris and Bessie went on to successful but separate careers. Bessie went on to found her own theatre troupe. She took over the management of the People’s Theater in 1915 and the following season the theater was renamed Bessie Thomashefsky’s People’s Theater. She focused on serious social issues of the day, particularly those affecting women, like suffrage and birth-control. Her memoir, Mayn lebens geshikhte (My life’s history: The joys and tribulations of a Yiddish star actress), as told to A. Tennenholz, was published in 1915.

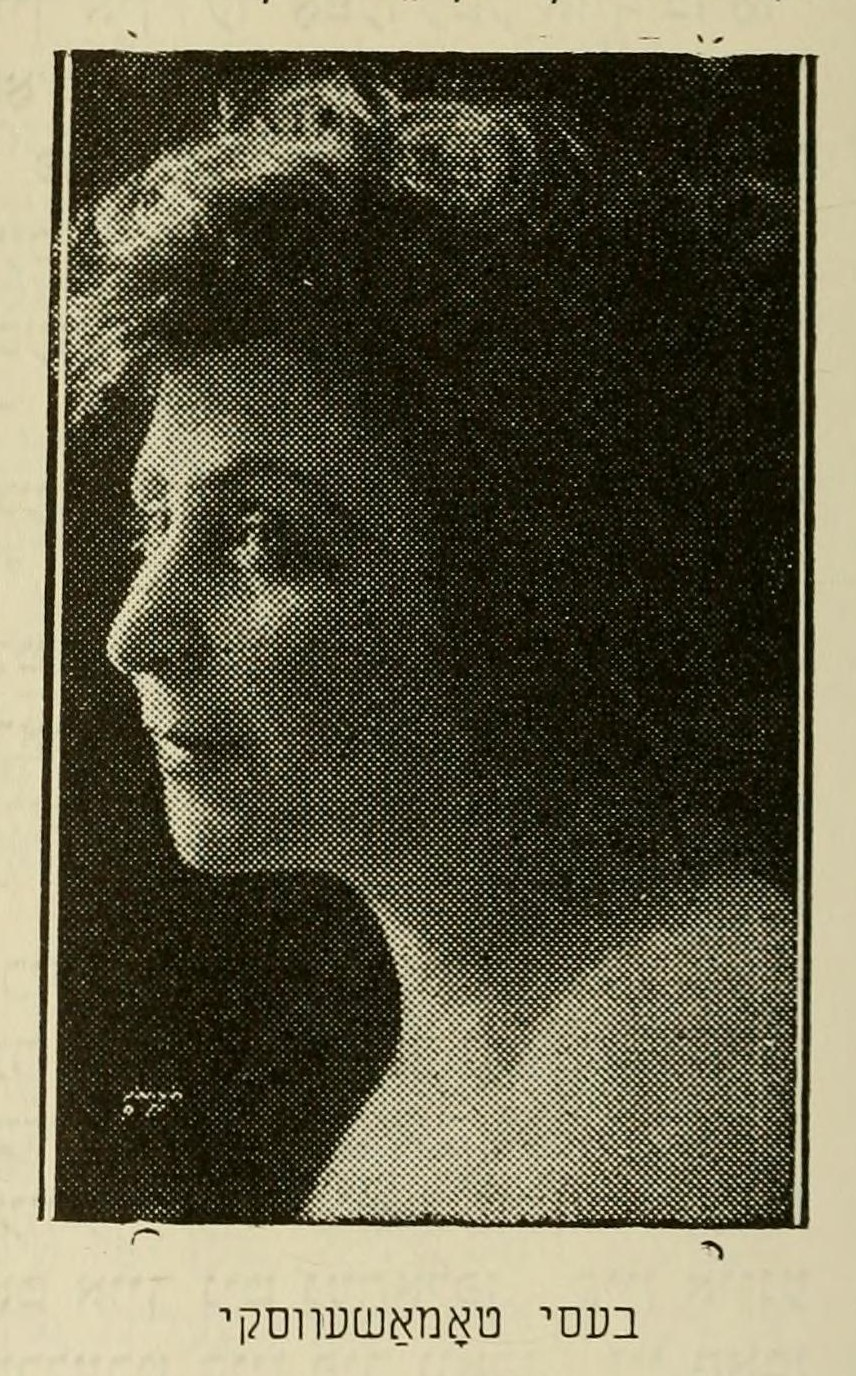
Bessie Thomashefsky

== Personal life ==
In 1889, 16-year-old Bessie had a daughter, Esther, with Boris and in 1891 they were married. Esther died at the age of 6 of diphtheria. They also had 3 sons. Their first son, Harry, started acting at the age of 13 in the play The Pintele Yid (A Little Spark of Jewishness, 1909), became a director of the Federal Theater's Yiddish Theater Project and directed his father in films The Jewish King Lear (1934) and The Bar Mitzvah Boy (1935). Their second son, known as Mickey, took after his father's romancing ways and romanced two women at the same time which led to a dramatic murder-attempt/suicide in 1931, reminiscent of his paternal aunt Emma Thomashefsky Finkel's notorious 1904 affair. Both Mickey and his aunt Emma were left paralyzed by the attempted murders by jealous mates and both later died of complications related to their wounds; Emma, many years later, in 1929, and Mickey in 1936. Their third son, Theodore, changed his name to Ted Thomas and became a stage manager. Ted Thomas's son is the noted conductor Michael Tilson Thomas.

After Boris's death, Harry moved with his mother to California. Bessie lived in California until her death in 1962, aged 89, and was buried with her husband in the Yiddish theater section of the Mount Hebron Cemetery, New York. Ted Thomas died in 1992, aged 88. Harry died in Los Angeles in 1993, aged 97.

== Death and legacy ==
Both Thomashefskys did much to shape the world of modern theatre from the follies to Broadway and gave a start to many actors, composers and producers who went on to start and own theaters and movie studios. Even the Gershwin brothers had their start with the Thomashefkys. They were also prominent in addressing controversial social issues of the day and in teaching the Greenhorns how to be Americans. They founded theaters and production companies, as well as publishing houses and many other successful business ventures.

In 2011, Michael Tilson Thomas hosted a concert stage show celebrating his grandparents and the music of American Yiddish theatre which aired in 2012 on the PBS series Great Performances. Bessie Thomashefsky was portrayed by Judy Blazer.
