= Margaretta Schwartz =

Late 19th century Yiddish theatre performer

Margeretta Schwartz was one of the first distinguished female performers in Yiddish theater. She and her sister Annetta shared prima donna duties in Abraham Goldfaden's troupe in Romania beginning in 1877. Jacob Adler described the sisters as "absolutely respectable" women with classical training as singers. He also writes that when they performed in Odessa, Ukraine in the late 1870s, they had Paris dresses of a quality that had never been seen in that city.
