= Mario Rojzman =

Argentine rabbi

Rabbi Mario Rojzman
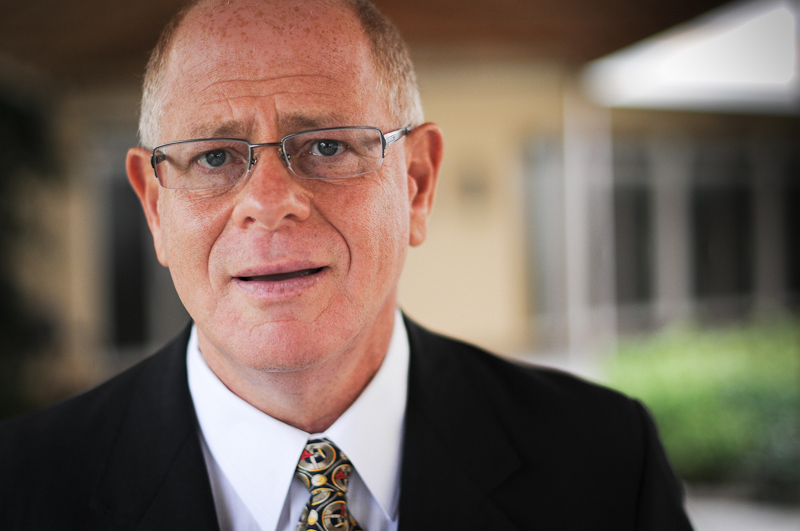
- Photo courtesy of Heritage Film Project
- Born: Buenos Aires, Argentina
- Education: Hebrew University
- Occupation: Beth Torah Benny Rok Campus
- Spouse: Gisela Ludman
- Parent(s): Henri Guero, Rosita Londner

Rabbi Mario Rojzman is a polyglot Torah scholar born in Buenos Aires in 1962. A graduate from the Hebrew University in Jerusalem, Rojzman received the rabbinical ordination from the Latin American Rabbinical Seminary in 1987.

== Biography ==
Rojzman is the son of legendary Yiddish stage-actors Henri Guero, and Rosita Londner. He grew up behind the curtains watching his parents perform for a worldwide audience. Following his graduation Cum Laude in 1988 from the Hebrew University in Jerusalem, Rojzman became Rabbi at Bet El Community in 1990 where he served for eleven years.

== Career ==
In 1991, during the Gulf War, he was invited by the World Zionist Organization to join the founders of Mercaz Olami, the Zionist Arm of the Jewish Conservative Movement. Between 1997 and 2000, he presided the Comparative Religions department at the University of Palermo. As a spokesman for human rights he has been featured as guest speaker at the Inter American Development Bank, UNESCO and World Bank. His activism on inter-religious affairs took him in special missions to Jerusalem, and Rome where he met with Pope John Paul II, and Pope Benedict XVI. Rojzman, together with Bishop Justo Oscar Laguna, co-hosted “Laguna-Rojzman: To keep us thinking”, a TV Show and “All Roads Lead to Jerusalem…and also to Rome”. Most recently, Rabbi Mario Rojzman was conferred doctorate honoris causa from the New York Theological Seminary in recognition for his service to the Jewish People and Social Justice.

Rojzman is one of two rabbis at Beth Torah Benny Rok Campus in Aventura. since 2003. He lives in North Miami with his wife Gisela Ludman, and their five children.

== Published works ==
- “All Roads Lead to Jerusalem…and also to Rome”. Co/authored next to Monseñor Justo Oscar Laguna. ISBN 978-987-237900-1
- Series of 52 episodes or "Parashiots" from the Torah. Produced by Heritage Film Project between 2011 and 2012, 5772 in the Jewish Calendar. The series were produced by the Beth Torah Benny Rok Campus in North Miami.The episodes were broadcast weekly on Beth Torah Benny Rok Campus website, on the institution's Facebook and YouTube.
