= Yiddish Theatre District =

Former district in Manhattan, New York

- District
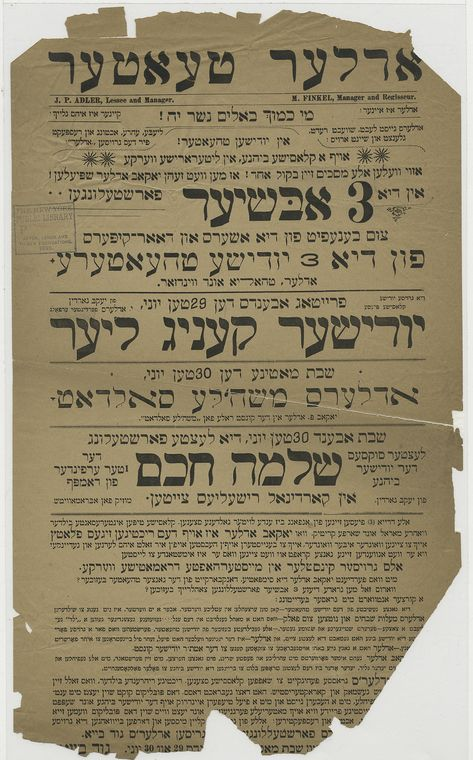
- poster for The Yiddish King Lear
- Country: United States
- State: New York State
- City: New York City
- Boroughs of New York City: Manhattan

The Yiddish Theatre District, also called the Jewish Rialto and the Yiddish Realto, was the center of New York City's Yiddish theatre scene in the early 20th century. It was located primarily on Second Avenue, though it extended to Avenue B, between Houston Street and East 14th Street in the East Village in Manhattan. The District hosted performances in Yiddish of Jewish, Shakespearean, classic, and original plays, comedies, operettas, and dramas, as well as vaudeville, burlesque, and musical shows.

By World War I, the Yiddish Theatre District was cited by journalists Lincoln Steffens, Norman Hapgood, and others as the best in the city. It was the leading Yiddish theater district in the world. The District's theaters hosted as many as 20 to 30 shows a night.

After World War II, however, Yiddish theater became less popular. By the mid-1950s, few theaters were still extant in the District.

== History ==
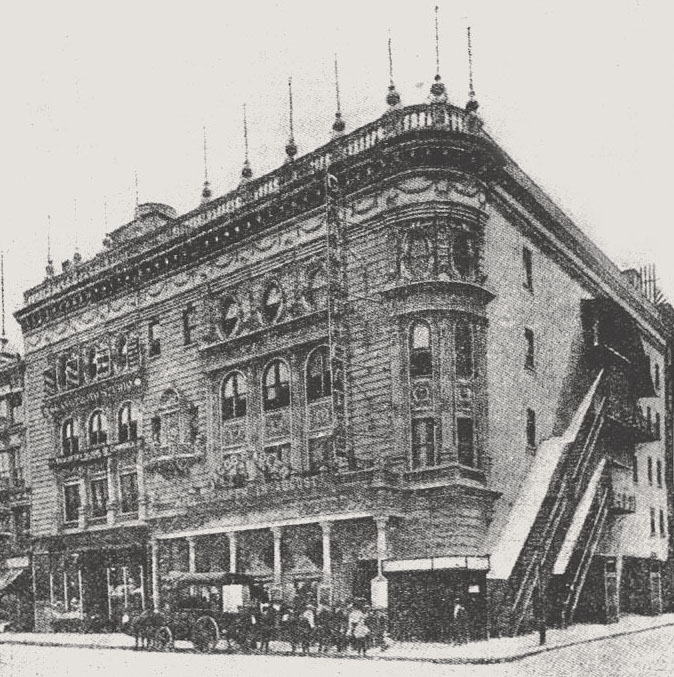
The Grand Theatre, some time before 1906

The United States' first Yiddish theater production was hosted in 1882 at the New York Turn Verein, a gymnastic club at 66 East 4th Street in the Little Germany neighborhood of Manhattan. While most of the early Yiddish theaters were located on the Lower East Side south of Houston Street, several theater producers were considering moving north along Second Avenue by the first decades of the 20th century.

In 1903, New York's first Yiddish theater was built, the Grand Theatre. In addition to translated versions of classic plays, it featured vaudeville acts, musicals, and other entertainment. Second Avenue gained more prominence as a Yiddish theater destination in the 1910s with the opening of two theatres: the Second Avenue Theatre, which opened in 1911 at 35–37 Second Avenue, and the National Theater, which opened in 1912 at 111–117 East Houston Street.

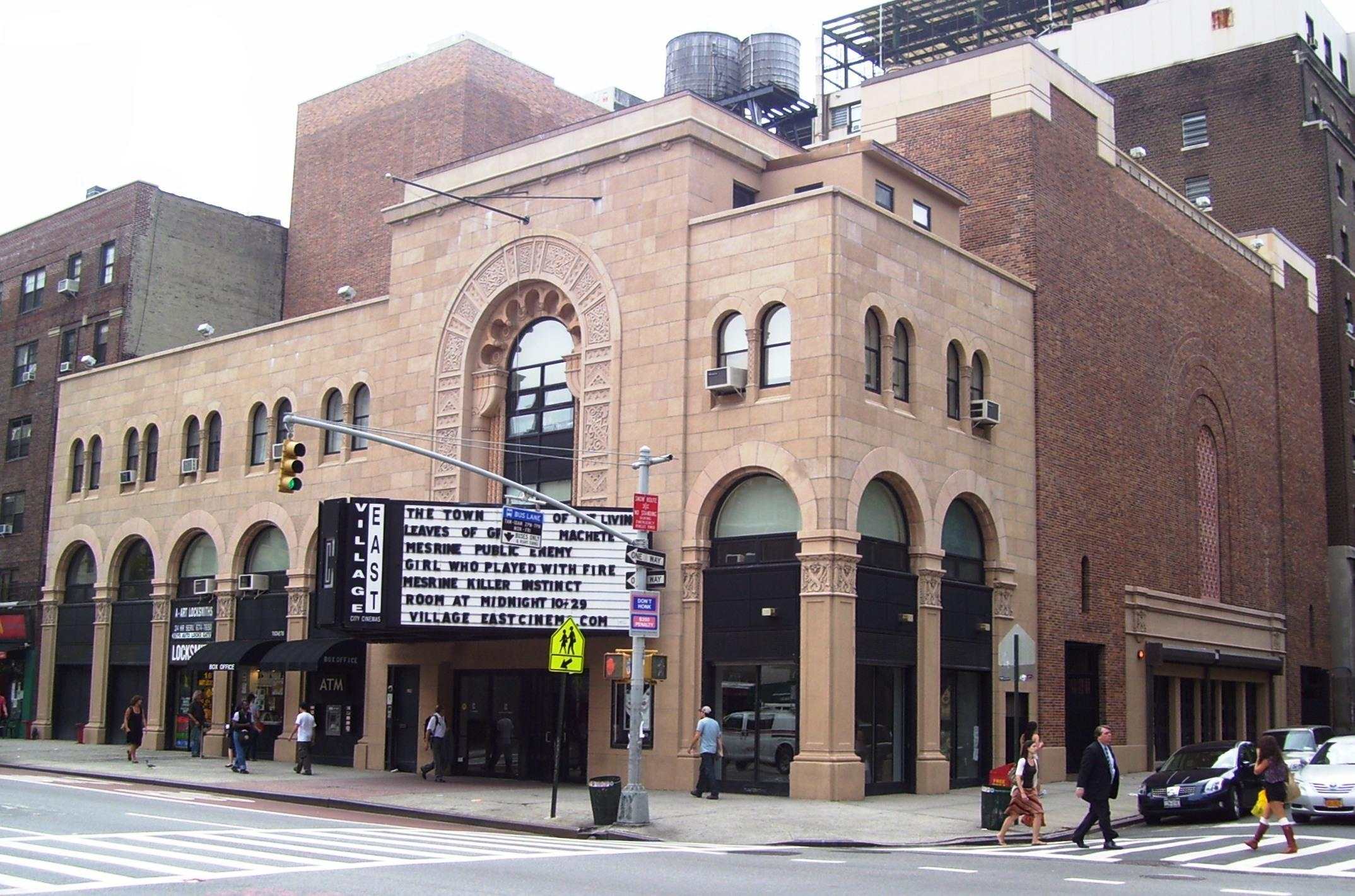
In 1926, developer Louis N. Jaffe built this theatre for actor Maurice Schwartz ("Mr. Second Avenue") and his Yiddish Art Theatre. After four seasons it became the Yiddish Folks Theatre, then a movie theatre, the home of the Phoenix Theatre, the Entermedia Theatre, and now a movie theater again, the Village East Cinema. It was designated a New York City landmark in 1993.

In addition to Yiddish theaters, the District had related music stores, photography studios, flower shops, restaurants, and cafes (including Cafe Royal, on East 12th Street and Second Avenue). Metro Music, on Second Avenue in the District, published most of the Yiddish and Hebrew sheet music for the American market until they went out of business in the 1970s. The building at 31 East 7th Street in the District is owned by the Hebrew Actors Union, the first theatrical union in the US.

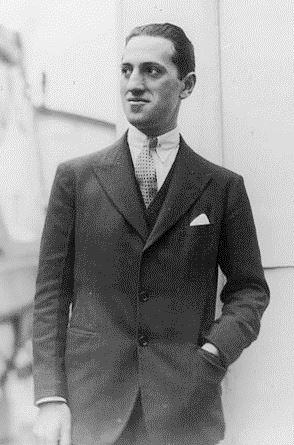
George Gershwin, c. late 1920s or early 1930s

The childhood home of composer and pianist George Gershwin (born Jacob Gershvin) and his brother lyricist Ira Gershwin (born Israel Gershowitz) was in the center of the Yiddish Theatre District, on the second floor at 91 Second Avenue, between East 5th and 6th Streets. They frequented the local Yiddish theaters. Composer and lyricist Irving Berlin (born Israel Baline) also grew up in the District, in a Yiddish-speaking home. Actor John Garfield (born Jacob Garfinkle) grew up in the heart of the Yiddish Theatre District. Walter Matthau had a brief career as a Yiddish Theatre District concessions stand cashier.

Among those who began their careers in the Yiddish Theatre District were actor Paul Muni and actress, lyricist, and dramatic storyteller Molly Picon (born Małka Opiekun). Picon performed in plays in the District for seven years. Another who started in the District was actor Jacob Adler (father of actress and acting teacher Stella Adler), who played the title role in Der Yiddisher King Lear (The Yiddish King Lear), before playing on Broadway in The Merchant of Venice.

The Second Avenue Deli, opened in 1954 by which time most of the Yiddish theaters had disappeared, thrived on the corner of Second Avenue and East 10th Street in the District, but it has since moved to different locations. The Yiddish Walk of Fame is on the sidewalk outside of its original location, honoring stars of the Yiddish era such as Molly Picon, actor Menasha Skulnik, singer and actor Boris Thomashevsky (grandfather of conductor, pianist, and composer Michael Tilson Thomas), and Fyvush Finkel (born Philip Finkel).

In 2006, New York Governor George Pataki announced $200,000 in state funding would be provided to the Folksbiene, the last remaining historical Yiddish theatre company.

== See also ==
- Boston Theater District
- Buffalo Theater District
- Cleveland Theater District
- Houston Theater District
- Times Square Theater District
