= Moishe Finkel =

Yiddish theatre performer (c.1852 – 1904)

- משה פינקעל
- Born: c. 1852; Odesa, Kherson Governorate, Russian Empire
- Died: June 7, 1904 (aged 51–52); Orange, New Jersey, US
- Cause of death: Suicide by firearm
- Spouses: Annetta Schwartz (divorced); Emma Thomashefsky (separated)
- Children: 4
- Relatives: Boris Thomashefsky (brother-in-law); Bessie Thomashefsky (sister-in-law); Paul Muni (son-in-law); Berta Gersten (daughter-in-law); Michael Tilson Thomas (great-nephew)

Moishe Finkel (Yiddish: משה פינקעל; c. 1852 – June 7, 1904), also known as Morris Finkel and Maurice Finkel, was a Yiddish theater actor, theatre director and manager. Finkel died during the attempted murder-suicide of his estranged wife, Emma Thomashefsky, and her partner David Levinson.

== Biography ==
Finke was born around 1852 (Note: Also cited as 1885 and 1845.) in Odesa, Kherson Governorate (present-day Ukraine) possibly under the name Moishe Friedman.

He was business partner first of Abraham Goldfaden and later of Sigmund Mogulesko (the greatest Yiddish star of the generation) and, for a time, was married to prima donna Annetta Schwartz. Together, they dominated Yiddish theatre in Bucharest in the early 1880s and in New York City in the late 1880s and into the 1890s, with a repertoire based mainly in the works of Joseph Lateiner and Moses Horowitz.

After divorcing Schwartz, who returned to Europe, Finkel, then in his 40s, married 16-year-old Emma Thomashefsky, sister of one of the most powerful figures in Yiddish theatre, Boris Thomashefsky. They had two children, but their relationship was always troubled and eventually Emma Finkel left her husband and began divorce proceedings. Her suit mentioned examples of spousal cruelty including violence. She began a relationship with another actor, David Levinson. At the same time, Moishe Finkel's business partnership with Jacob Adler, which entailed managing the Grand Theatre together, ended with a bitter dispute and a legal battle for control of the theatre eventually settled in Adler's favor. Emma Finkel and her lover had continued working for Adler.

On June 7, 1904, while Emma, the children and Levinson were staying at a summer colony in Orange, New Jersey, Finkel turned up unexpectedly and shot his wife, Levinson, and himself. He killed himself and seriously injured his wife. Levinson was unhurt.

Jacob Adler wrote of him that he "never smiled" and other contemporaneous accounts concur that he had a difficult personality. Finkel's son from his first marriage, Abem Finkel, became a Hollywood scriptwriter. Another son, Isaac Hershel (later known as Irwin H. Fenn), married actress Berta Gersten. The children from his marriage to Emma, Bella and Lucy Finkel, became Yiddish actors. Bella married Paul Muni. Emma Thomashefsky Finkel lived partially paralyzed for a number of years, and continued to act in roles that could be played sitting down. She died of complications from her condition in 1929, aged 46.
