= Annetta W. Peck =

American writer

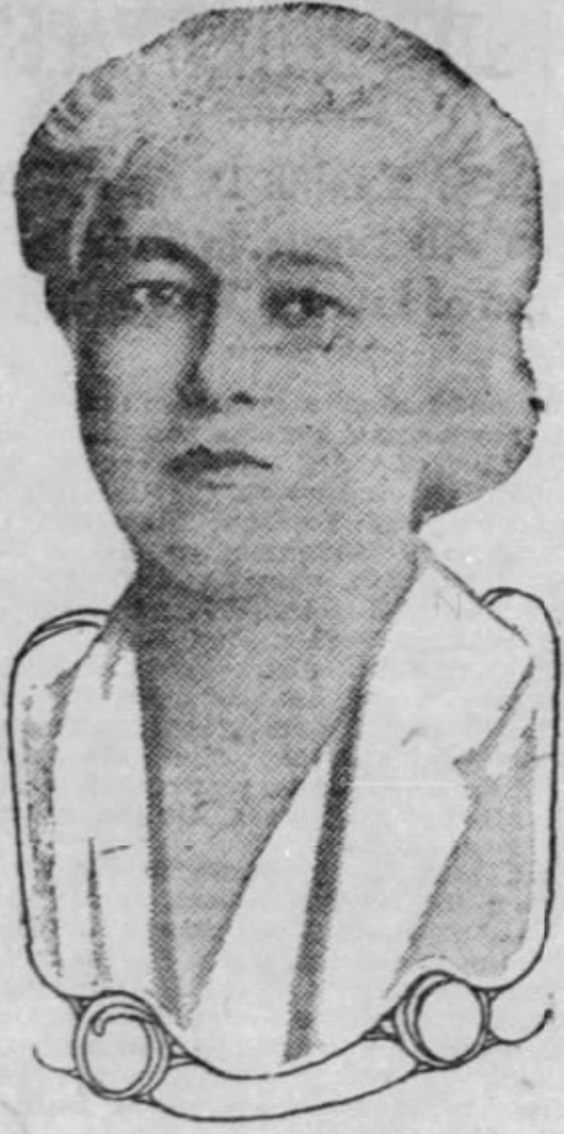
- Annetta W. Peck, from a 1921 newspaper
- Born: October 15, 1871; New Jersey
- Died: July 14, 1958 (age 86); New York
- Occupation(s): Writer, clubwoman, community leader
- Known for: Executive secretary, New York League for the Hard of Hearing

Annetta W. Peck (October 15, 1871 – July 14, 1958) was an American clubwoman, writer, and community leader. She was a founder and executive secretary of the New York League for the Hard of Hearing in the early twentieth century, and vice-president of the American Federation of Organizations for the Hard of Hearing. She spoke and wrote widely on the work of the League.

== Early life ==
Peck was born in New Jersey, the daughter of Nathan Peck and Ella Maria Thatcher Peck. She was training as a pianist in her teens when she began to lose her hearing. She gave up music as her impairment worsened.

== Career ==
Peck helped found the New York League for the Hard of Hearing in 1911. "We are not dealing with the deaf," she explained in a 1923 article. "The New York League for the Hard of Hearing and similar organizations are working for and with the deafened only, and admit no one to membership who cannot speak intelligently and intelligibly." She served as the League's executive secretary into the 1930s, and vice-president of the American Federation of Organizations for the Hard of Hearing.

Peck also led the Rochester Hearing Society after she moved to Rochester in 1942, and was a founder of the American Hearing Society. In her lectures and writings, she advocated for lip reading classes, community inclusion, employment and recreational opportunities, and audiological screenings in schools. She worked on services for deafened soldiers after both World War I and World War II. She retired in 1952.

== Honors ==
Peck received the Better Times Medal for Distinguished Social Service in 1927. "The simplicity and directness of her methods and her gallant and wholehearted devotion to her cause have made her a leader whose inspiration has carried far beyond the limits of her immediate undertaking," commented Mrs. Danforth Geer Jr., as she presented Peck's medal.

== Publications ==
Peck wrote for academic and professional journals, including The Laryngoscope, Hospital Social Service Quarterly, The Volta Review, and Journal of Exceptional Children.

- "How the Deafened Rebuild Their Lives" (1920)
- "Social Alleviations of Adventitious Deafness" (1921)
- "Hospital Social Service and the Deafened" (1923)
- Ears and the man; studies in social work for the deafened (1926, with Estelle E. Samuelson and Ann Lehman)
- "In the Presence of Beauty" (1927)
- "Ninety Thousand Dollars for the Study of Deafness" (1927)
- "Errors that Hamper the Education of Deaf Children" (1934)
- "Twenty-five Years for the Hard of Hearing Child" (1936, with Estelle E. Samuelson)
- "Organizations for service to the hard-of-hearing: New York League for the Hard-of-Hearing" (1937)

== Personal life ==
Peck used a mechanical hearing aid. She died in 1958, at the age of 86, in New York City.
