= Khupe =

Khupe is a surname. Notable people with the surname include:

- Givemore Khupe (born 1999), South African footballer
- Thokozani Khupe (born 1953), Zimbabwean politician and trade unionist
- Watson Khupe (1962/63–2022), Zimbabwean politician
