= Winter Garden =

A winter garden is a garden where winter-hardy plants are grown for winter decoration or to be harvested for food between winter and early spring.

Winter Garden(s) may also refer to:

== Gardens and other landmarks ==
- Auckland Domain Wintergardens, Auckland Domain, Auckland, New Zealand
- People's Palace and Winter Gardens, a museum and glasshouse in Glasgow, Scotland, United Kingdom
- Springburn Winter Gardens, a large derelict glasshouse constructed in 1900 in Glasgow, Scotland, United Kingdrom
- Renaissance Center Wintergarden in Detroit, Michigan, United States
- Sunderland Museum and Winter Gardens, a museum and modern glasshouse in Sunderland, North East England, United Kingdom
- The Winter Garden commissioned by Ludwig II of Bavaria on the roof of the Munich Residenz
- Winter Gardens (Bordighera), created by botanist Ludwig Winter in Bordgihera, Italy
- The Wintergarden, a former indoor arboretum in downtown Niagara Falls, New York, United States
- Winter Garden at Exposition Hall, a skating rink in Pittsburgh, Pennsylvania, United States
- Winter Garden Atrium, a large public atrium in the World Financial Center in New York City, New York, United States
- Wintergarden, Brisbane, shopping centre in Brisbane, Queensland, Australia
- Winter Garden, Sheffield, one of the largest temperate glasshouses in the United Kingdom

== Places ==
- Winter Garden, Florida, city located west of Orlando, Florida, United States
- Winter Garden Region, agricultural region in southern Texas, United States
- Winter Gardens, California, neighborhood in the unincorporated community of Lakeside in San Diego County, California, United States

== Theatres ==
=== Canada ===
- Elgin and Winter Garden Theatres, Toronto, Ontario

=== United Kingdom ===
- Bournemouth Winter Gardens
- Morecambe Winter Gardens
- Winter Gardens, Blackpool, a complex of theatres and conference facilities
- Winter Gardens (Cleethorpes), a former entertainment venue
- Winter Gardens, Great Yarmouth
- Winter Gardens Theatre, a former theatre and cinema in New Brighton on Merseyside
- Winter Gardens, Southport
- Winter Gardens Pavilion, Weston-super-Mare
- Winter Garden Theatre, London, on a site now occupied by the New London Theatre

=== United States ===
- The Winter Garden Theatre (1850) at 624 Broadway, New York City; opened in 1850 and demolished in 1867
- The Olympia Theatre (New York City), also known as the Winter Garden Theatre, at 1514–16 Broadway, New York City; opened in 1895 and demolished in 1935
- The current Winter Garden Theatre at 1634 Broadway, New York City; opened in 1911

== Other uses ==
- Winter Garden (album), a 2015 South Korean compilation of Christmas songs
- Winter Garden (anime), a 2006 spin-off from Di Gi Charat
- Winter Garden, a 1980 novel by Beryl Bainbridge
