= Annetta Kapon =

Greek artist

Annetta Kapon (born 1950), is a Greek-born American artist and educator, who works in sculpture, installation and video art.

She teaches at Otis College of Art and Design in Los Angeles. Kapon has had solo exhibitions the Armstrong/Schoenheit Gallery and the Centre d'Art Marnay Art Center. She is the recipient of a California Community Foundation grant.

== Collections ==
- Benton Museum of Art, Untitled Cameras
- Museum of Contemporary Art, North Miami, Your Balance
- UCR/California Museum of Photography, Indoor
