= Regina Zuckerberg =

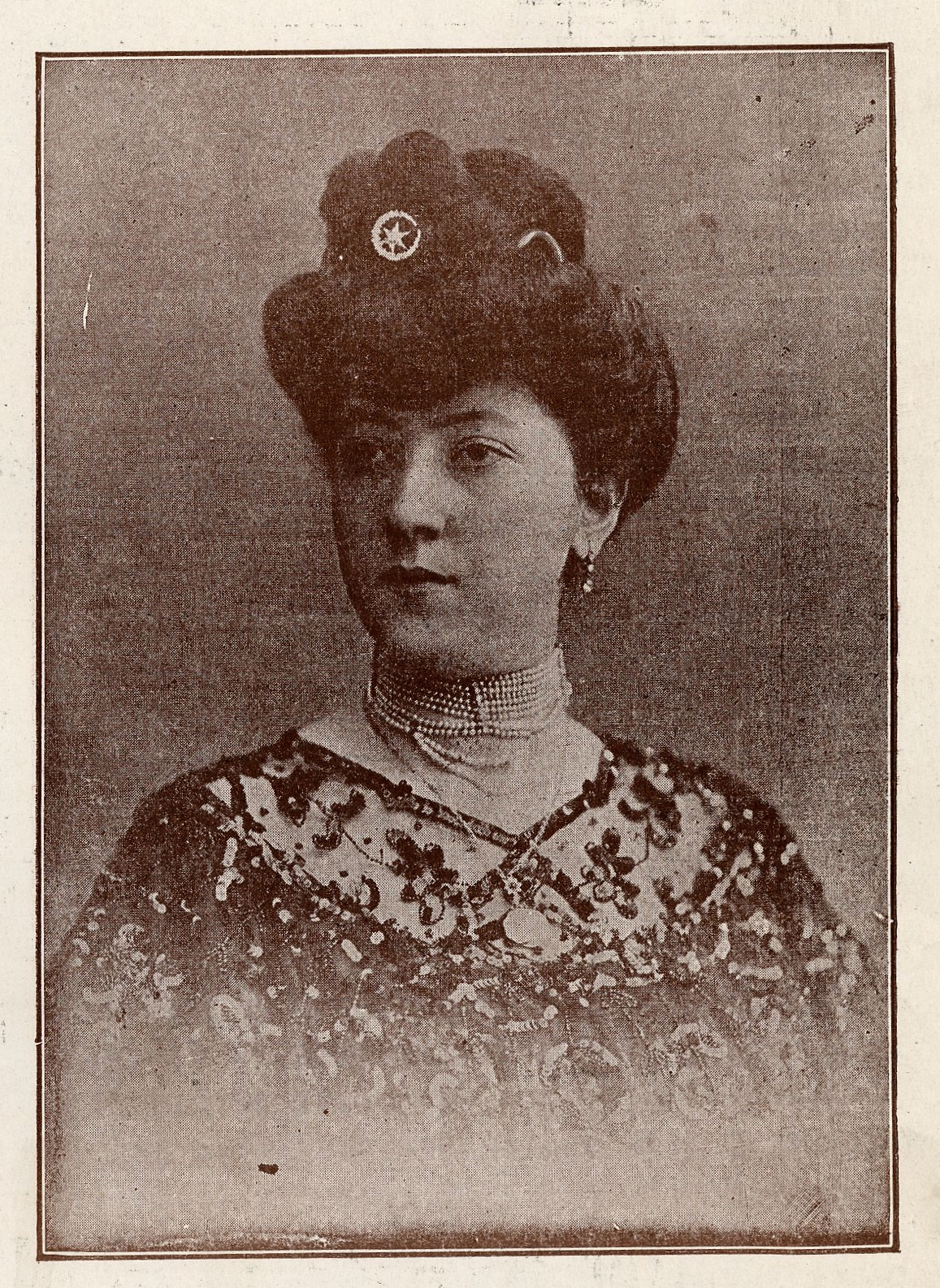
Regina Zuckerberg c. 1911

Regina Zuckerberg (Yiddish: רעגינע צוקערבערג or רעגינא, c. 1888–1964) was an Austrian-born Yiddish theatre actor and Prima donna who had a career both in Europe and the United States.

== Biography ==
Regina Zuckerberg was born Rifke Kobak on 19 March 1887 or 1888 in Lemberg, Galicia, Austria-Hungary (today Lviv, Ukraine). Her parents were Leiser and Gittel (née Zuker) Kobak. She was involved in singing and performance from a young age; as a youth she sang in a temple choir in Lemberg under Cantor Halperin. She met her first husband, Sigmund (Zaynvil) Zuckerberg, also an actor, and they were married in Lemberg in 1904. At around that time they joined a troupe led by Sholem Perlmutter which toured successfully around Galicia, as well as the famous Gimpel Theatre troupe based in Lemberg. Due to her striking appearance and strong voice she was highly in demand as a leading actress.

She had a daughter, Pauline, who was born in Chernivtsi in 1907. She emigrated to the United States in March 1908, sailing from England to New York City. She made some appearances on the London Yiddish theatre stage during her journey. Her mother, Gittel, also followed her to the United States a few months later. The month Regina arrived she joined Boris Thomashefsky's People's Theater in the Bowery, where she was billed as the "Austrian Tetrazzini." That marked the beginning of several decades of collaboration with Thomashefsky; Jacob P. Adler was also involved in bringing her to the New York theatre world. Regina seems to have gone back to Europe and returned with Sigmund in the following years, apparently settling permanently in the United States in 1911.

In New York, as in Galicia, Regina was highly in demand as an actress. She also recorded a handful of 78-rpm discs at Victor records in 1916 during the wartime boom in local Yiddish recording. Those ten sides, which were recorded over a two-day period, were mainly Yiddish theatre songs of the day by such contemporary composers as Arnold Perlmutter, Herman Wohl, and Louis Friedsell.

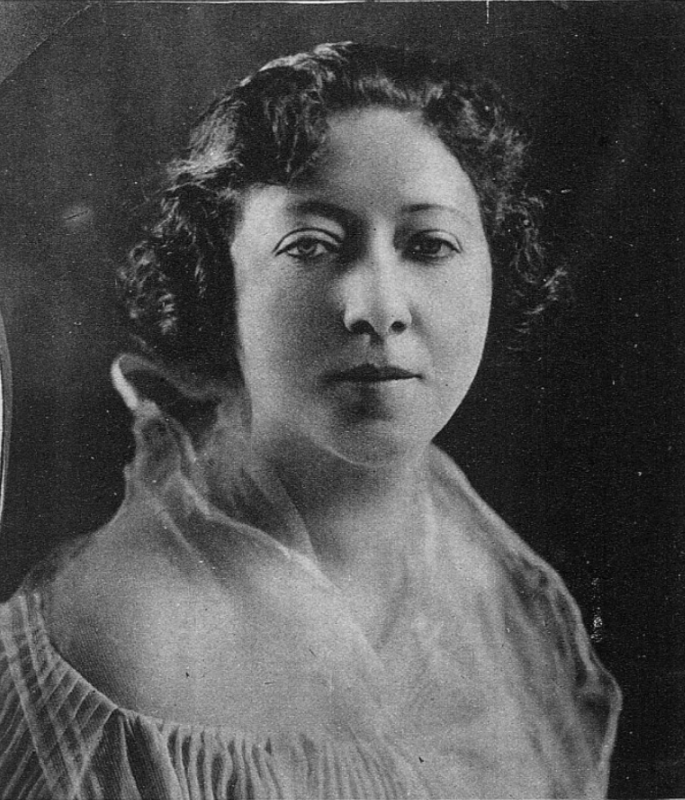
Regina Zuckerberg, c. 1923

She divorced her first husband Sigmund in Chicago in 1920. She had become romantically involved with Boris Thomashefsky, who had given her the leading role in his production over his own wife Bessie, who eventually left him. Sigmund sued Thomashefsky for $100,000 for "loss of marital affection." Regina and Boris were then married to one another.

In the 1920s and 1930s Regina continued to tour successfully with Thomashefsky's productions. In 1935 she costarred in her only film role, the Yiddish talkie Bar Mitzvah, written and directed by Henry Lynn, based on a Thomashefsky play and produced by Lynn and Jack Stillman. When Thomashefsky died in 1939 Regina was at his bedside.

Her Yiddish theatre career seems to have declined after Thomashefsky's death. In 1943 she remarried in New Jersey to an insurance salesman named Robert Kessler.

She died in Jersey City on October 4, 1964 at age 76. She was buried at the Mount Hebron Cemetery.
