= Joseph Lateiner =

Romanian Yiddish playwright (1853–1935)

Joseph Lateiner (né Finkelshteyn; December 25, 1853 – February 23, 1935) was a playwright in the early years of Yiddish theater, first in Bucharest, Romania and later in New York City, where he was a co-founder in 1903 with Sophia Karp of the Grand Theater, New York's first purpose-built Yiddish language theater building.

Born in Iaşi, Moldavia, now Romania, Lateiner got his start writing for theater in Iaşi around the start of 1878, when Israel Grodner, having left Abraham Goldfaden's Bucharest company, needed a playwright. He added some topical material to a German-language comedy Nathan Schlemiel oder Orthodoxe und reformirte Juden by J. Rosenzweig (Note: Rosenzweig's text says that the action is "somewhere in Hungary" and a 1906 Hungarian reference book gives author's name as Ignácz Rosenzweig, born in Pozsony (Both Pressburg and Poszony are the names of Bratislava,)) (Ein Tendenz-Lustspiel in 3 Acten. Pressburg, 1873), and came up with a play Die Tzwei Schmuel Schmelkes (The Two Schmuel Schmelkes). He translated and "Yiddishized" plays from Romanian and German; his more than 80 plays included Mishke and Moshke: Europeans in America (or The Greenhorns), "Satan in the Garden of Eden", and "The Jewish Heart".

Lateiner's Yiddish language operetta Blihmele (English: "Little Flower"). premiered in 1894 at the Windsor Theatre, New York City, and included the hit song "Khosn kale mazel tov" written by Sigmund Mogulesko.

By showing that Goldfaden was not the only person who could write a successful play in Yiddish, he opened the floodgates for other Yiddish playwrights.
