= Annetta Grodner =

Annetta Grodner (or Gradner) was a Ukrainian Jewish singer and actress, the first prima donna in Yiddish theater.

The daughter of a bootmaker in Kremenchuk, Ukraine, she met and married Israel Grodner some time around 1870, when he passed through Kremenchuk in the course of his wanderings as a young Broder singer. Her husband was recruited by Abraham Goldfaden as the first professional Yiddish-language stage actor, but initially Yiddish theater was an entirely male affair. The gender barrier was broken by the teenaged Sara Segal, later famous under the name Sophie Karp. However, Annetta Grodner was the first to play prima donna roles.

Jacob Adler wrote that she was "an actress with the seventh degree of charm" and that her singing voice was "not strong, but melodious—a voice 'with tears in it.' There was always something sweetly sad in her singing—even her gay songs tore at your heart."

Annetta Grodner shared many (though not all) of her husband's wanderings through Europe until his early death in London in 1887.
