= The Opry House =

1929 film by Walt Disney and Ub Iwerks

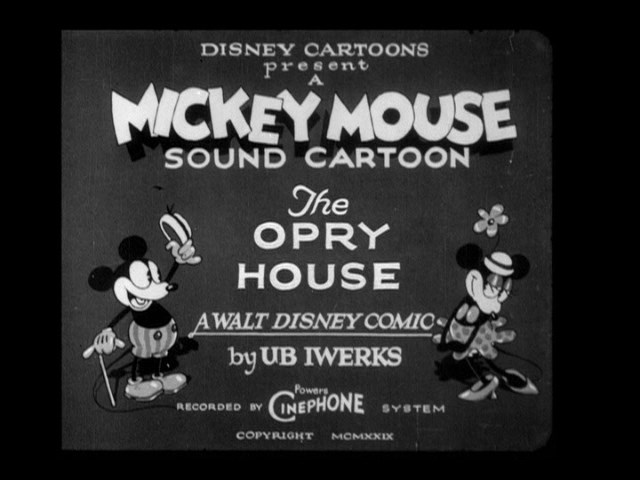
- Directed by: Walt Disney; Ub Iwerks
- Produced by: Walt Disney
- Music by: Carl Stalling
- Animation by: Ub Iwerks
- Production company: Disney Cartoons
- Distributed by: Celebrity Productions
- Release date: March 20, 1929
- Running time: 7:25
- Country: United States
- Language: English

The Opry House is a 1929 American animated short film directed by Walt Disney and Ub Iwerks. It is the fifth film in the Mickey Mouse film series. It was the fifth Mickey Mouse short to be released, the second of that year. It cast Mickey as the owner of a small theater (or opera house according to the title). Mickey performs a vaudeville show all by himself. Acts include his impersonation of a snake charmer, his performing a belly dance, his caricature of a Hasidic Jew and, for the finale, a piano performance of Hungarian Rhapsody No. 2 by Franz Liszt. It was released on March 20, 1929 by Celebrity Productions. Columbia Pictures reissued the film after Walt Disney Productions switched distributors.

== Plot ==
The short

The cartoon starts with the opening of a theater and Mickey Mouse sweeping and using the broom as an instrument and a dance partner. Mickey is then faced with a large show goer, who must be deflated in order to fit through the doorway. The band takes over, with a large variety of short gags occurring throughout. Mickey becomes the star of the show, taking on the multiple roles of a vaudeville star. The cartoon ends with a humorous fight between Mickey, a piano and a stool. Mickey's interactions are highly stylized in order to capture the essence of what a vaudeville performance should be. The "Asbestos" stage curtains hits Mickey, causing the stars to fill in and towards the screen, and ends the film.

== Production ==
The Opry House was the fifth Mickey Mouse cartoon released by Walt Disney Productions. It appears in black and white, and the audio was recorded using Pat Powers's cinephone system. It was animated mostly by Ub Iwerks, Walt Disney's first employee who later became known as a "Disney Legend". The short became the most expensive early Disney short, its negative cost being almost $2,500 more than the Steamboat Willie cartoon produced just a year before.

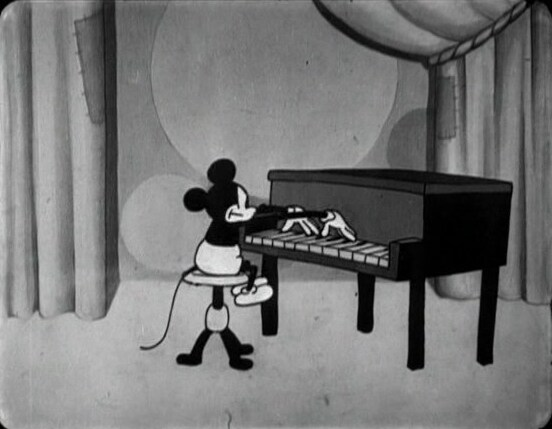
Mickey in the short.

This short is an early example of how the Disney studio's animated shorts became more sophisticated. The short shows more realistic animating. The early Disney cartoons, like Steamboat Willie show many similarities to the Oswald the Lucky Rabbit cartoons that preceded them, but as Mickey Mouse evolved from the silent film era, the cartoons became more intricate. Mickey Mouse began interacting within his space in his cartoon world to create a more realistic feel.

Walt Disney himself reinforces this idea:

"...Our characters were beginning to act & behave like real persons. Because of this we could begin to put real feeling and charm into our characterization. After all you can't expect charm from animated sticks and that is what Mickey Mouse was in his first pictures".

Mickey's fight with the piano would be reused and extended seven months later in the cartoon The Jazz Fool.

== Use of music ==
This short features no dialogue and consequently its humor relies on a long series of visual gags. The accompanying musical pieces include "Yankee Doodle", Sergei Rachmaninoff's "Prelude in C-sharp Minor (Op. 3/2)", Georges Bizet's Carmen, the Klezmer tune "Chusen Kala Mazel Tov", and "Goodnight, Ladies". It is also the first appearance of "Hungarian Rhapsody No. 2" by Franz Liszt in a cartoon, and its use heavily influenced later cartoons including the Merrie Melodies short Rhapsody in Rivets (1941), Bugs Bunny's Rhapsody Rabbit (1946), Tom and Jerry's The Cat Concerto (1947) and Woody Woodpecker's Convict Concerto (1954).

The sound for the short was recorded in February 1929 in New York by Walt Disney and Carl Stalling. Because there is no dialogue, the music aids in telling the story. The music not only matches the actions being animated but the two are deeply connected. In one sequence a drummer pulls the tails of three different cats; those cat's meows become notes in the music sequence. Notable dialogue did not come until 1934, when Walt Disney voiced Mickey Mouse using a falsetto. The comedy of the short comes largely through the use of music.

== Mickey's gloves ==
Although Mickey had been wearing gloves on title cards and posters for his previous films, this is the first time he wears them in animation. They have since become part of his permanent appearance. Reportedly, one reason for adding the white gloves was to allow audiences to distinguish the characters' hands when they appeared against their bodies, as both were tinted black. Mickey didn't appear in color up until The Band Concert in 1935.

== Other characters ==
Mickey Mouse takes on multiple roles within the story of his vaudeville show. The short holds true to the early structure of Mickey Mouse cartoons. They are short, with less emphasis on storytelling and more focus on adventure and comedy. A variety of additional animals make up the crowd and the band members. In addition, the instruments, especially the piano and stool take on human qualities, making them integral characters.

Minnie Mouse doesn't appear in person in this short. Instead, a poster of her can be seen which introduces her as a member of the Yankee Doodle Girls, apparently a group of female performers. The only other recurring character to appear in the short is known as Kat Nipp (apparently a play on the word catnip). This would be his debut, and he would appear in two more shorts during the year as a minor antagonist.

== Reception ==
Variety (April 10, 1929): "Another of the Mickey Mouse series captioned "The Opery House", [sic] from Walt Disney's cartoonistic shop. The opery idea provides for a stage presentment of vaude bits effectively sounded. Sound accompaniment has made the cartoon strips much more valuable. And the comedy point intended is more decided in the building. Some funny stuff here, especially the piano number which has the instrument given the real planner synchronization, surprising in comparison with former silent strips."

The Film Daily (July 28, 1929): "Perfectly Swell. Even the piano takes on life in this Mickey Mouse release. Walt Disney is maintaining the high standard established with Steamboat Willie. The Op'ry House demonstrates this fact in view of the amusing kinks injected into the animation and the funny situations thereby created. One of the best sound shorts on the market, this release merits attention as a laugh-provoker."

Composer Sergei Rachmaninoff praised Mickey's performance of his prelude. In June 1942, Rachmaninoff reportedly told Walt Disney "I have heard my inescapable piece done marvelously by some of the best pianists, and murdered cruelly by amateurs, but never was I more stirred than by the performance of the great maestro Mouse".

== Home media ==
The short was released on December 7, 2004 on Walt Disney Treasures: Mickey Mouse in Black and White, Volume Two: 1929-1935.

== See also ==
- Mickey Mouse (film series)
