= Israel Grodner =

Lithuanian actor (c. 1848 – 1887)

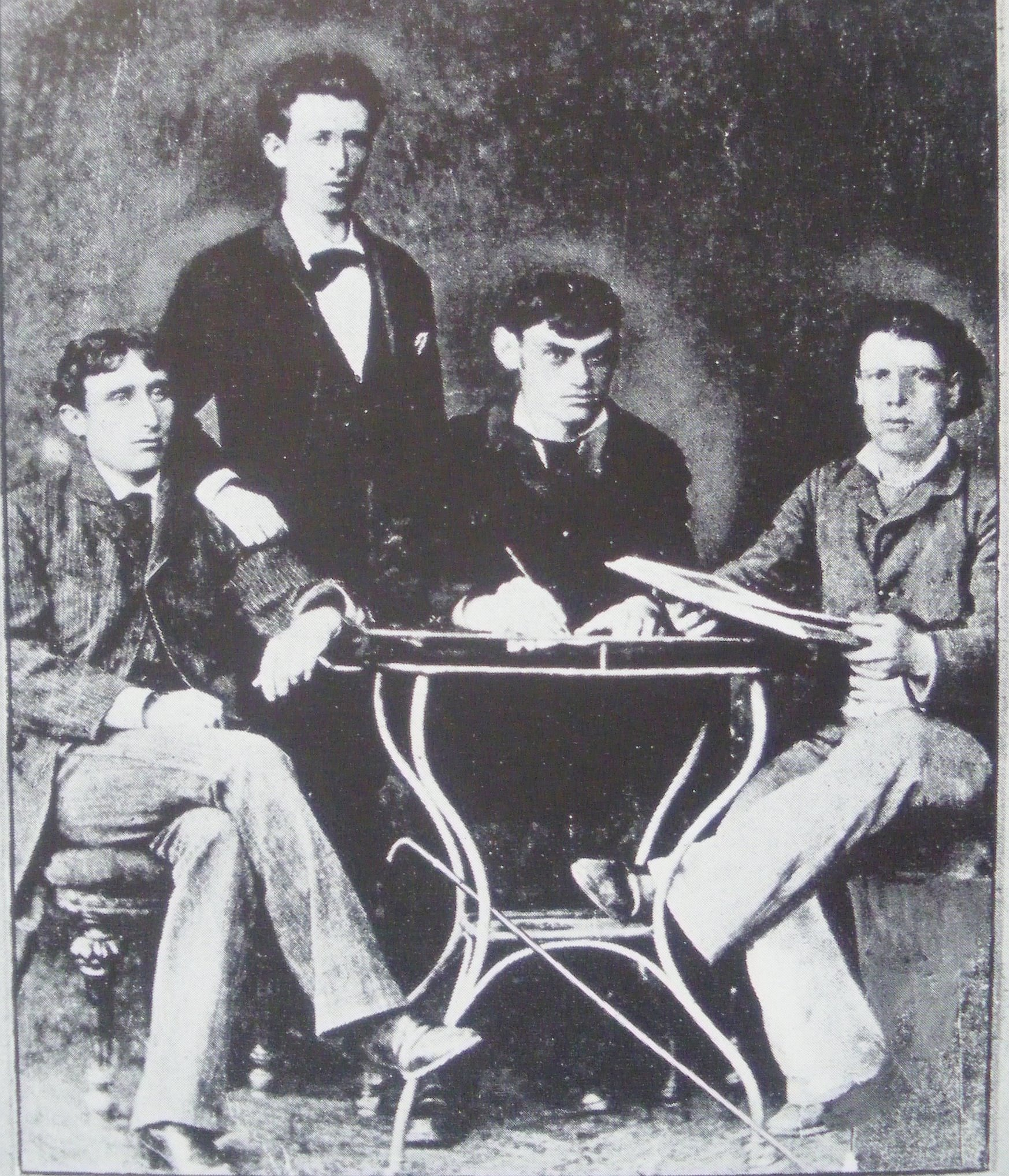
Israel Grodner, Eduard Margules, Kheym Shmuel Lukatsher, Avrom Akselrod, Yiddish actors c. 1874

Israel (Yisrol) Grodner (Yiddish: ישראל גראָדנער; c. 1848 – 1887) was one of the founding performers in Yiddish theater.

A Lithuanian Jew who moved at the age of 16 to Berdichev, Ukraine, Russian Empire, the Broder singer and actor was in Iaşi, Romania in 1876 when Abraham Goldfaden recruited him as the first actor for what became the first professional Yiddish theater troupe. Jacob Adler remarks that as the only Lithuanian Jew in the early years of Yiddish theater, he deliberately spoke a different dialect of Yiddish on stage so that it would blend better with the other actors. (The Yiddish of Lithuania differed from that of Ukraine and Romania.)

Although his early performances with Goldfaden are usually considered the start of professional Yiddish-language theater, as a Broder singer Grodner was already something of an actor, and he had already participated in an 1873 concert in Odessa, Ukraine in which he and other Broder singers sang songs (including some of Goldfaden's) and improvised comic material between songs that was very similar to Goldfaden's early, highly improvised, comic musical plays. Actor Jacob Adler, already a big fan of the highly regarded Russian language theater in Odessa at that time, and who saw Grodner perform in taverns and restaurants, indicates in his memoir the strong impression Grodner made on him for how well he portrayed his characters. Lulla Rosenfeld writes that Grodner was known in Odessa as "Srolikl Papirosnik" (from papiros, cigarette) because he always had a cigarette dangling from his lip.

Grodner met his wife Annetta in his travels as a Broder singer. She was also a fine performer, and eventually had a career of her own in Yiddish theater.

Grodner joined Goldfaden in the performances at the legendary Gradina Pomul Verde ("Green Fruit-Tree Garden") in Iaşi, then, when they could not rent a theater building in Iaşi, traveled with him to perform in Botoşani, Galaţi, Brăila, and finally Bucharest, where the troupe became an enormous hit, but where Grodner began to be eclipsed as lead actor by Sigmund Mogulesko.

Grodner quit Goldfaden's company to found his own in Iaşi, taking with him Moishe Finkel, Rosa Friedman, and his own wife, who was a good singer but had not previously been a stage performer; Sokher Goldstein soon followed. He recruited Joseph Lateiner as a playwright; their first play was The Two Schmul Schmelkes, based on a German story "Nathan Schlemiehl".

Soon Mogulesko also quit Goldfaden's company and joined Grodner's. In 1880 Grodner and Mogulesko toured to Warsaw, but soon Mogulesko had taken over the troupe and once again supplanted Grodner; Jacob Adler reports that around this time he also toured to Constantinople, briefly rejoined Goldfaden in Odessa, and then temporarily joined the traveling troupe of Israel Rosenberg, but that he was already in declining health at this time.

Shortly before Grodner founded a new troupe in Riga (again with Finkel, Friedman, and his wife Annetta, now their prima donna); after the 1883 ban on Yiddish theater in Imperial Russia, they went to London (which was briefly the center of Yiddish theater). The Grodners were briefly in a London troupe with Jacob and Sonya Adler at London's Prescott Street Club, at the first performance of which they played the leads in Der Bel Tchuve (The Penitent) by N.M. Sheikevitch; he also played the mischievous Tzingatan in a production of Goldfaden's Shulamith. Grodner soon left to found yet another troupe in Galicia, with which he toured to Vienna. His travels continued: London, Warsaw, and then back to London, where he died in 1887. According to Bercovici, he was buried in an unmarked grave in "Stratford"; it is not clear whether this means Stratford-upon-Avon or Stratford, London.
