= Windsor Theatre (Bowery, New York) =

Former theatre in NYC

Coordinates: 40°42′56″N 73°59′46″W

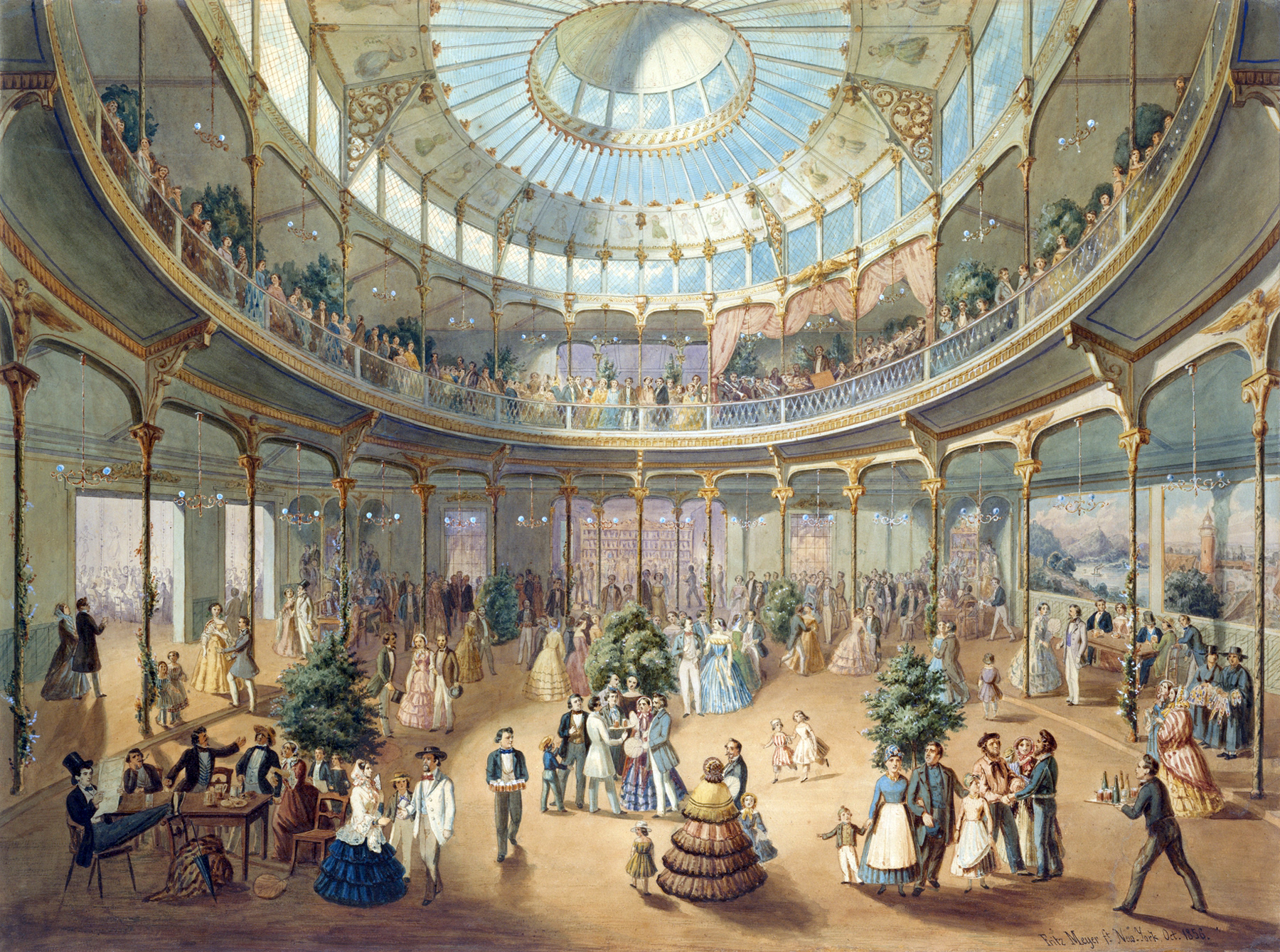
Interior of the German Winter Garden, Watercolor by Fritz Meyer, 1856

The Windsor Theatre, originally the German Winter Garden, was a theatre in Manhattan located at 43-47 Bowery, New York, New York, United States during 1855–1910. It was on the stretch between Bayard and Canal Streets, across the street from the Thalia Theatre.

In 1855 it was constructed as the German Winter Garden (aka Volks Garden). At this time the Bowery street was a cultural hub of German immigrants. In 1864 it was rebuilt and renamed to the New Stadt Theatre, in 1878 it was renamed to Windsor Theatre, after being briefly named The City Theatre. In 1883 it burned down and a new, smaller building was erected for it in 1886. It was demolished in 1910.

== History ==
The German Winter Garden ad 35 Bowery was oval in shape, designed by Henry Hoffmann. It was a beer hall, also licensed as a theatre. It had a second-floor balcony all around the interior.

T. Allston Brown gives the following chronology of the management of the venue since 1964.

At 43, 45, 47 Bowery, east side, directly opposite the Old Bowery Theatre [46 Bowery], was the "New Stadt Theatre." It was erected in 1864 by a company of Germans, and opened Tuesday, Sept. 6, 1864. It was five stories high, used as a hotel, with a wide entrance to the theatre, which was in the rear of the hotel. The auditorium was the largest of any theatre in the country, having a parquet and three tiers, with a capacity for thirty-five hundred persons. Otto von Hoym was the acting manager.

Starting with the season of August 31, 1868 Hamann & Rosenberg were the managers. Robert W. Butler leased the house July 4, 1878. "This house was christened "THE CITY THEATRE " on Sept. 16 <...> Its name was changed to the "WINDSOR THEATRE" Nov. 11. The first business manager of the house was Bobby Newcomb. <...> After having remained without a permanent manager for some months, it was reopened March 1, 1880, John A. Stevens and Frank J. Murtha as managers."

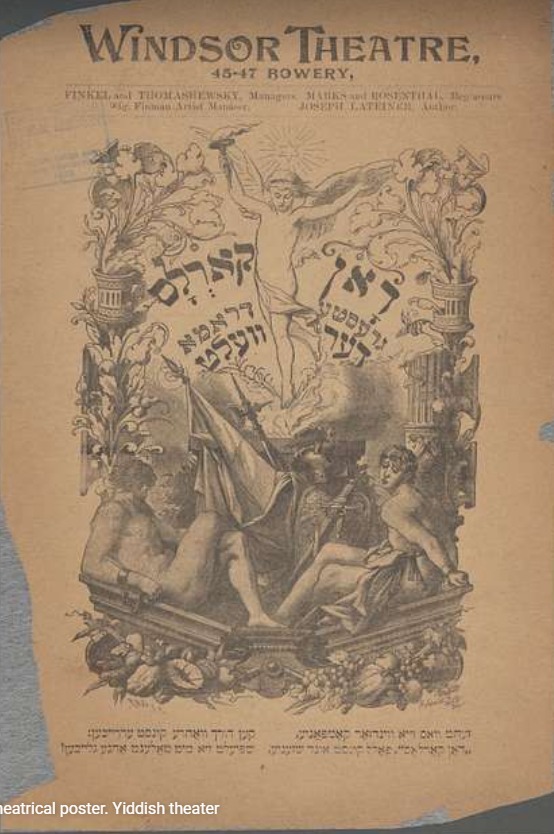
Don Karlos, a Yiddish theatre poster, Windsor Theatre

"The house was totally destroyed by fire Thursday, Nov. 29, 1883. The fire began at the entrance of the theatre. <...> Nothing was done towards rebuilding the theatre for over two years. Finally Mr. Martin, the former owner of the property, erected a new theatre much smaller than the other. It was leased to Frank Murtha, who opened it Feb. 8, 1886, on a five years' lease.

On March 25, 1893 the season of the theatre was closed, but the theatre was reopened March 27, 1893, as a Hebrew theatre under the management of Sigmund Mogulesko, Isidore Lindeman, and Joseph Levy. Mogulesko managed the theatre during the 1893-1894 season. In 1896 Mogulesko left the theatre due to a conflict with the theatre management.

== See also ==
- Stadt Theatre
- Winter Garden (disambiguation)
- Bowery Theatre
