= Boris Thomashefsky =

Ukrainian-American actor and singer (1868–1939)

- Yiddish: באָריס טאָמאשעבסקי; Ukrainian: Борис Томашевський
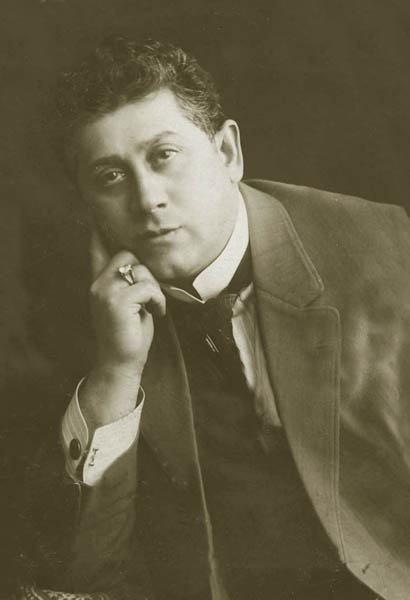
- Born: Baruch-Aaron Thomashefsky; May 29, 1866; Osytnyazhka, Kiev Governorate, Russian Empire (now Ukraine)
- Died: July 9, 1939 (aged 71); Manhattan, New York City, US
- Resting place: Mount Hebron Cemetery
- Occupations: Actor; theater director; theater manager; composer
- Spouse: Bessie Thomashefsky (m. 1891; sep. 1911)
- Children: 4

Boris Thomashefsky (Note: Also cited as Thomashevsky and Thomaschevsky) (Yiddish: באָריס טאָמאשעבסקי; Ukrainian: Борис Томашевський; May 29, 1866 – July 9, 1939), born Baruch-Aaron Thomashefsky, was a Ukrainian–American Yiddish theater actor, director, manager, and composer.

== Early life ==
Thomashefsky was born Baruch-Aaron Tomashevsky (Note: Also cited as Boruch-Aharon Tomashevsky.) on 29 May 1866 (Note: Also cited as 1868.) in the village of Osytnyazhka, Kiev Governorate (present-day Ukraine). Thomashefsky grew up in the nearby town of Kamyanka until, at the age of 11, he left for Berdychiv where he trained as a meshoyrer (choir singer) in the renowned synagogue choir of cantor Nisan Belzer.

In 1881, he emigrated with his family to the United States, and just a year later, while still a teenager, he was largely responsible for the first performance of Yiddish theater in New York City, in what was to become the Yiddish Theater District. He has been credited as the pioneer of Borscht Belt entertainment.

Although Thomashefsky left Imperial Russia at a time when Yiddish theater was still thriving there (it was banned in September 1883), he had never seen it performed prior to the 1882 performance he brought together in New York. Thomashefsky, who was earning some money by singing on Saturdays at the Henry Street Synagogue on the Lower East Side, was also working as a cigarette maker in a sweatshop, where he first heard songs from the Yiddish theater, sung by some of his fellow workers.

== Career ==
Thomashefsky managed to convince a local tavern owner to invest in bringing over some performers. The first performance was Abraham Goldfaden's Yiddish operetta די מכשפה (The Witch). The performance was a mild disaster: pious and prosperous "uptown" German Jews opposed to the Yiddish theater did a great deal to sabotage it. His performing career was launched in part due to an instance of this sabotage—bribing the soubrette to fake a sore throat, Thomashefsky went on in her place.

Shortly afterward, the teenage Thomashefsky was the pioneer of taking Yiddish theater "on the road" in the United States, performing Goldfaden's plays in cities such as Philadelphia, Washington, D.C., Baltimore, Pittsburgh, Boston and Chicago, all in the 1880s; for much of the 1880s, Chicago was his base. After Yiddish theater was banned in Russia, his tours came to include such prominent actors as Siegmund Mogulesko, David Kessler, and Jacob Adler, with new plays by playwrights such as Moses Ha-Levi Horowitz.

In 1887, playing in Baltimore, he met 14-year-old Bessie Baumfeld-Kaufman, when she came backstage to meet the beautiful young "actress" she had seen on stage, only to discover that "she" was Boris. Bessie soon ran away from home to join the company, and eventually took over the ingenue roles, as Boris moved on to romantic male leads. They married in 1891.

In 1891, with Mogulesko, Kessler, and Adler all engaged in starting the Union Theater, Moishe Finkel brought the still relatively unknown Thomashefsky back to New York to star at his National Theater, where Thomashefsky became enough of a success in Moses Halevy Horowitz's operetta David ben Jesse as to force the Union Theater temporarily to abandon its highbrow programming and compete head on.

After Adler recruited Jacob Gordin as a playwright and found a way to draw the masses to serious theater with Gordin's The Yiddish King Lear, and then turned to Shakespeare's Othello, Thomashefsky decided to show that he could compete on that ground as well, and responded with the first Yiddish production of Shakespeare's Hamlet, in which, by all reports, he acquitted himself excellently. His production of Hamlet was more than just a direct translation; the story was also adapted to make it more accessible to a devout European Jewish audience. At the start of the play, young Hamlet has been away at Rabbinical college, and his uncle has seduced the Queen Mother away from King Hamlet, breaking the old man's heart. There are sectarian jokes regarding communication with angels. Claudius spreads a rumor that Prince Hamlet has succumbed to nihilism while away, but his scheme is discovered and the traitor is sent to Siberia in his nephew's stead. The play ends early, with Hamlet ceremonially marrying Ophelia at her funeral then dying of a broken heart. These types of edits were not uncommon in the Yiddish-language theatre scene. Some critics view it as a step away from immigrant assimilation, others as one step further towards common ground between the new residents and their American neighbors. These productions ushered in what is generally seen as the first great age of Yiddish theater, centered in New York and lasting approximately until a new wave of Jewish immigration in 1905—08 once again resulted in a vogue for broad comedy, vaudeville and light operettas, which the Thomashefskys embraced wholeheartedly, especially in performing Leon Kobrin's plays about immigrant life.

Other notable Thomashefsky productions included Yiddish versions of Uncle Tom's Cabin, Goethe's Faust and, unlikely as it may seem, Wagner's Parsifal.

According to the Jewish Virtual Library, in an adaptation of Hamlet called Der Yeshiva Bokher (The Yeshiva Student), "a wicked uncle smears [a] rabbinic candidate’s reputation by calling him a nihilist and the young man dies of a broken heart." (They don't say whether this was the production that went head-to-head with the Adler/Kessler Othello.)

By 1910, Thomashefsky owned a 12-room home on Bedford Avenue in Brooklyn, plus a bungalow by the sea, and 20 acres (81,000 m^{2}) in Hunter, New York, which included an open-air theater, Thomashefsky's Paradise Gardens. Each of his three sons had an Arabian horse.

However, in 1915, Thomashefsky filed for bankruptcy, listing assets of $21,900 and debts of $76,297.65.

In 1935, late in his career, Thomashefsky was an actor/singer in Henry Lynn's Yiddish film Bar Mitzvah, in which he played a melodramatic role with gusto and co-produced the film. He sang Erlekh Zayn (Be Virtuous), a song from a 1924 Yiddish play, Bar Mitzvah.

== Personal life ==
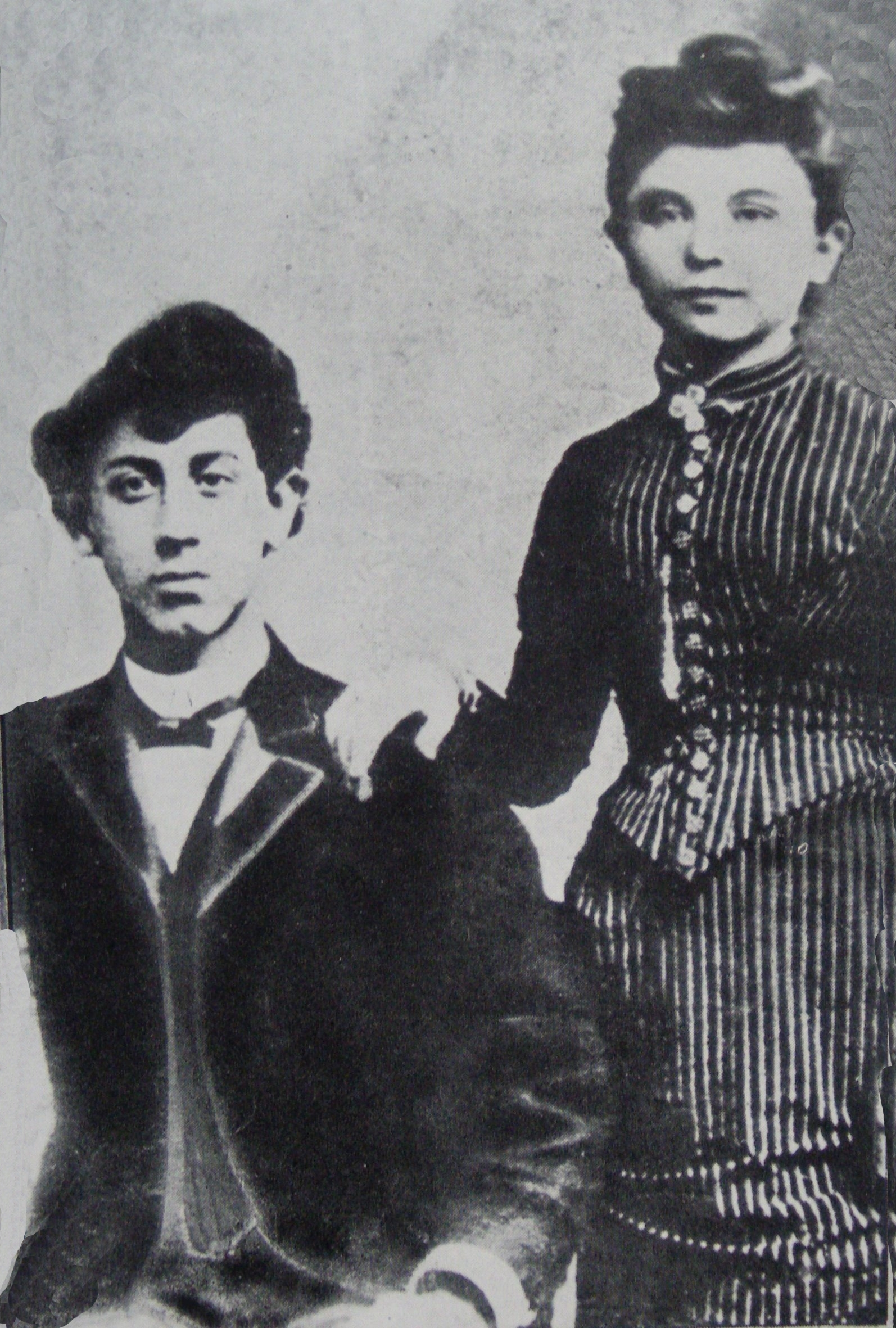
Boris and Bessie Thomashevsky's engagement portrait, 1890

With his wife, actress Bessie Thomashefsky, he had three sons, as well a daughter who died when she was six years old. The third son, Theodore, changed his name to Ted Thomas and became a stage manager. Ted Thomas's son is conductor Michael Tilson Thomas. The first son, Harry, went on to direct the film The Yiddish King Lear (1935), under the auspices of the Federal Theatre Project, and later moved with his mother to Los Angeles. The second son, Mickey, had affairs with two women at the same time, which led to a dramatic murder-attempt/suicide in 1931, reminiscent of his aunt Emma Thomashefsky Finkel's notorious 1904 affair. Both Mickey and his Aunt Emma were left paralyzed by the attempted murders by jealous mates and both later died of complications related to their wounds; Emma, many years later, in 1929, and Mickey, five years after in 1936. Boris Thomashefsky carried on a long-term affair with Yiddish actress Regina Zuckerberg, an Austrian-born actress twenty years younger than Bessie. This caused Boris and Bessie to separate. Both went on to have successful but separate careers. However, Boris became a pauper in the 1930s.

== Death and legacy ==
On July 9, 1939 Thomashefsky died in Manhattan aged 71. Thomashefsky is buried with his wife, who, although separated from him by 1911, never divorced him, in the Yiddish theater section of the Mount Hebron Cemetery, Flushing, Queens, New York.

Both Thomashefskys did much to shape the world of modern theatre from the follies to Broadway and gave a start to many actors, composers and producers who went on to start and own theaters and movie studios. Even the Gershwin brothers had their start with the Thomashefkys. They were also prominent in addressing controversial social issues of the day and in teaching the Greenhorns how to be Americans. They not only founded theaters and production companies, but had publishing houses and many other successful business adventures. Boris Thomashefsky even founded and funded a Jewish Army which he sent to Israel and was named after him. The unit later became a unit in the British Army.

In the Marx Brothers film, Monkey Business (1931), Groucho Marx (in defending his right to hide in a gangster's moll's closet) exclaims, "That's what they said to Thomas Edison, mighty inventor, Thomas Lindbergh, mighty flyer, and Thomashefsky, 'mighty lak a rose'!" Tribute was also paid in Mel Brooks' stage and film musicals based on his 1968 film The Producers, when Max Bialystock attributes his acumen as a Broadway producer to the tutelage of "the great Boris Thomashefsky" in the song "The King of Broadway".

In 2011, Shuler Hensley portrayed Boris Thomashefsky in The Thomashefskys: Music and Memories of a Life in the Yiddish Theater, a concert stage show celebrating the Thomashefskys and the music of American Yiddish theatre hosted by their grandson the conductor Michael Tilson Thomas. The show aired on the PBS series Great Performances in 2012.

== Works ==
- 'The Broken Violin (1918), music by Joseph Rumshinsky

== Sources ==
- Chira, Susan, "100 Years of Yiddish Theater Celebrated", The New York Times, October 15, 1982, C28.
- Adler, Jacob, A Life on the Stage: A Memoir, translated and with commentary by Lulla Rosenfeld, Knopf, New York, 1999, ISBN 0-679-41351-0.
- Liptzin, Sol, A History of Yiddish Literature, Jonathan David Publishers, Middle Village, NY, 1972, ISBN 0-8246-0124-6.
- Boris Thomashefsky from the Jewish Virtual Library (JVL), retrieved February 28, 2005.
