= Society of Jewish Composers, Publishers and Songwriters =

Defunct American musical licensing organization (1932–54)

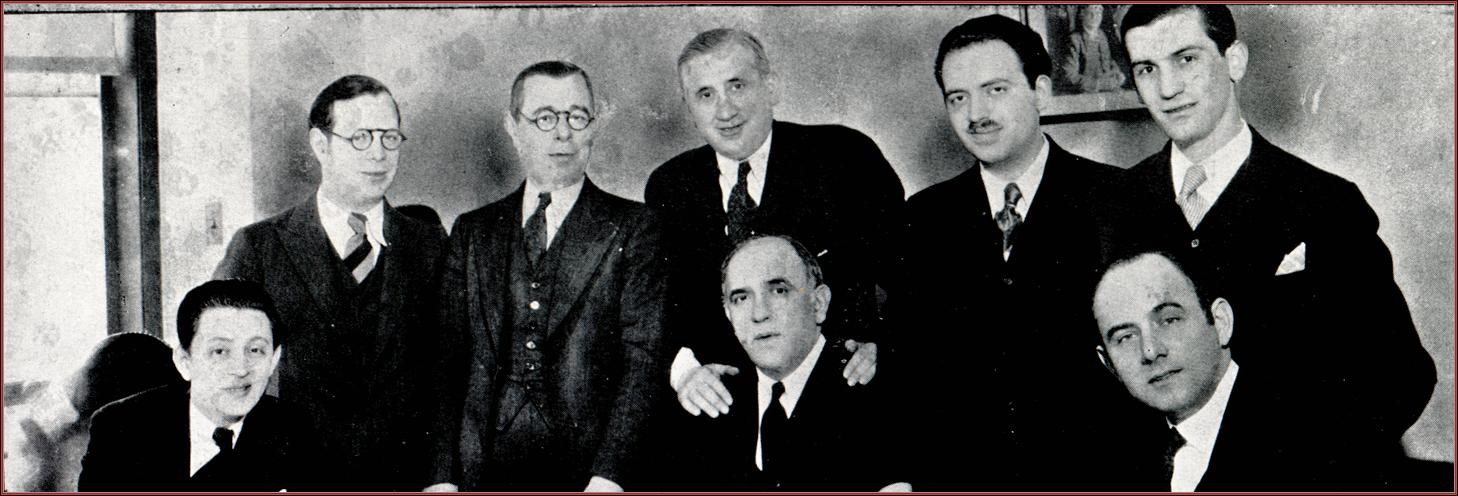
Founding members of the Society of Jewish Composers, Publishers and Songwriters

The Society of Jewish Composers, Publishers and Songwriters (Yiddish: געזעלשאפט פון יידישע קאָמפּאָזיטאָרן, romanized: Gezelshaft fun idishe kompozitorn), sometimes called the Jewish Composers' Society, was an American music licensing organization founded in New York City in 1932. Its founders and members, which included Sholom Secunda, Abe Ellstein and Joseph Rumshinsky, were Jewish composers associated with the Yiddish Theatre and Yiddish-language popular music. The Society lasted until 1954 when its remaining members joined the American Society of Composers, Authors and Publishers.

== History ==
In the early 1930s, composers of Yiddish song, as well as Jewish music publishers and Yiddish Theatre composers, were generally excluded from the American Society of Composers, Authors and Publishers (ASCAP). These composers saw their songs being performed live in such settings as the Borscht Belt, as well as being recorded and played on the radio, without receiving any royalties. Composer and bandleader Alexander Olshanetsky, who is credited with proposing the founding of the Society, complained that composers couldn't make enough to survive on royalties and were forced to work as theatre managers or booking agents on the side.

In February 1932, the founding group of composers hired lawyers Joseph Steinberg and E. Edward Moscowitz to draft a constitution and register the Society of Jewish Composers, Publishers and Songwriters based on ASCAP's model. Joseph Rumshinsky acted as president, Sholom Secunda as secretary and Olshanetsky as treasurer; within weeks they recruited publishers, composers and lyricists who remained as the stable membership of the organization for most of the decade:

- A. W. Binder
- Kammen Publishing Co.
- Metro Music Co.
- Joseph Brody
- Yasha Kreitzberg (Jack Saxon)
- Alexander Olshanetsky
- Abraham Ellstein
- Philip Laskowsky
- Joseph Rumshinsky
- Mikhl Gelbart
- Henry Lefkowitch
- Sholom Secunda
- Solomon Golub
- Isidore Lillian
- A. Singer
- Jacob Jacobs
- Harry Lubin
- A. Weisser
- Pinchos Jassinowsky
- David Meyerowitz
- Herman Wohl
- Zavel Zilberts

Secunda and the lawyer Moscowitz approached Yiddish radio stations, hotels, and wedding halls, and signed some contracts to get royalties for their music. Within a year the society became profitable. The Society also sued when they felt the copyright on their compositions had been infringed; this included a suit against Eron Pictures in 1938 over the use of "I Love You Too Much" as background music in The Cantor's Son.

In 1940, Broadcast Music Incorporated (BMI) was founded as a competitor to ASCAP; it was less restrictive than ASCAP, and the Society was able to join it and have BMI collect royalties on their behalf in exchange for a fee. The Society's 2500 songs were added to BMI's extensive catalogue. ASCAP tried to entice Sholom Secunda, whose Bei Mir Bistu Shein made him the most lucrative member of the Society, to join them. He eventually declined, fearing his departure would kill the Society.

In the postwar era, with a gradual decrease in Yiddish record and sheet music sales, the Society's importance declined as well. After 1954 its former members who were still actively composing, including Secunda, joined ASCAP.
