= Lipa Feingold =

American Jewish composer, poet and jeweler

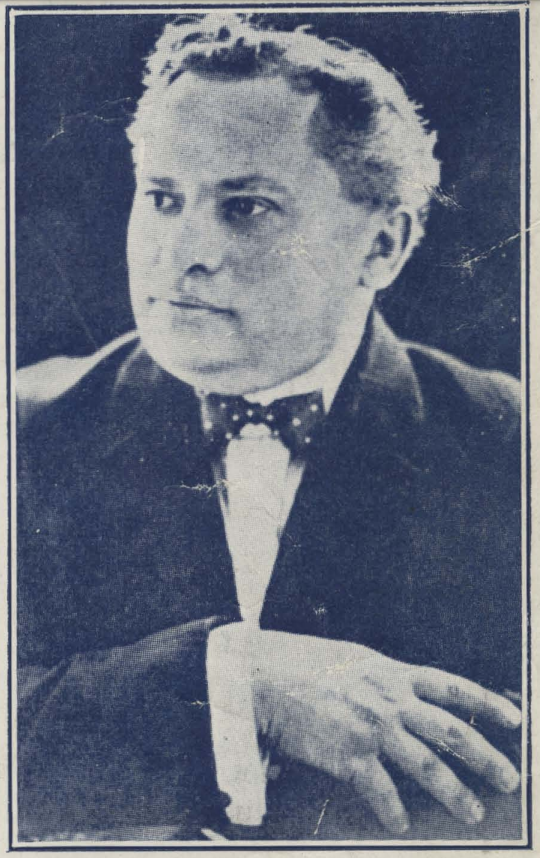
Lipa Feingold, 1920s

Lipa Feingold (Yiddish: ליפּא פײנגאָלד, 1878–1945) was a Russian-born American songwriter, pianist, composer, and jeweler. The peak of his popularity as a composer was in the 1920s and 1930s; his pieces were performed by many well-known New York Jewish music figures such as Abe Ellstein, Yossele Rosenblatt and Alexander Olshanetsky, and later by Theodore Bikel and Leibele Waldman.

== Biography ==
Feingold was born on November 17, 1878, in Berdychiv, Kiev Governorate, Russian Empire (today located in Zhytomyr Oblast, Ukraine). His father was a jeweler. As a youth, Lipa was interested in music and took lessons from the cantor and composer Nissan Spivak who was at that time living in Berdychiv.

In 1903, he married Bessie Braude. They lived in Warsaw for a time. They had their first child Rebecca (Shirley) in Warsaw in 1904. He and Bessie emigrated to the United States in early 1904, sailing from Antwerp and initially settling in New York City. They had a second child, Charles, in New York in 1906. When Bessa contracted tuberculosis in 1907, a doctor recommended that they leave the city and they ended up settling in Denver, Colorado. While living in Denver and mainly supporting himself as a jeweler, he composed Yiddish and English music and would often send them to New York to be published or performed. Feingold also acted on stage in Denver Yiddish theatre productions, and had a solo singing and comedy act where he was occasionally accompanied by his wife who could play violin. Starting in around 1919 he also led a Zionist girls' choir called Hatikvah. He became interested in children's education and became a Sunday school music teacher at B'nai Israel. In 1923, after being invited as a guest soloist (Baritone) at Beth HaMedrosh Hagodol-Beth Joseph during the High Holidays, he became a regular supporting singer and eventually director of the synagogue's choir.

In 1925, Lipa, Bessie and their daughter Shirley left Denver for New York and Lipa began to compose for Tin Pan Alley. Their son Charles stayed in Denver. His compositions, especially 1927's Hayntike khazonim and Der nayer yid became popular and he also often worked as an accompanist. His poems or song lyrics were printed in newspaper such as Der Tog and his music was published by the Kammen Brothers. In 1936 he published one of his only book-length set of scores, a book of settings of Avrom Reyzen poems to music titled Tsen lider (Ten songs).

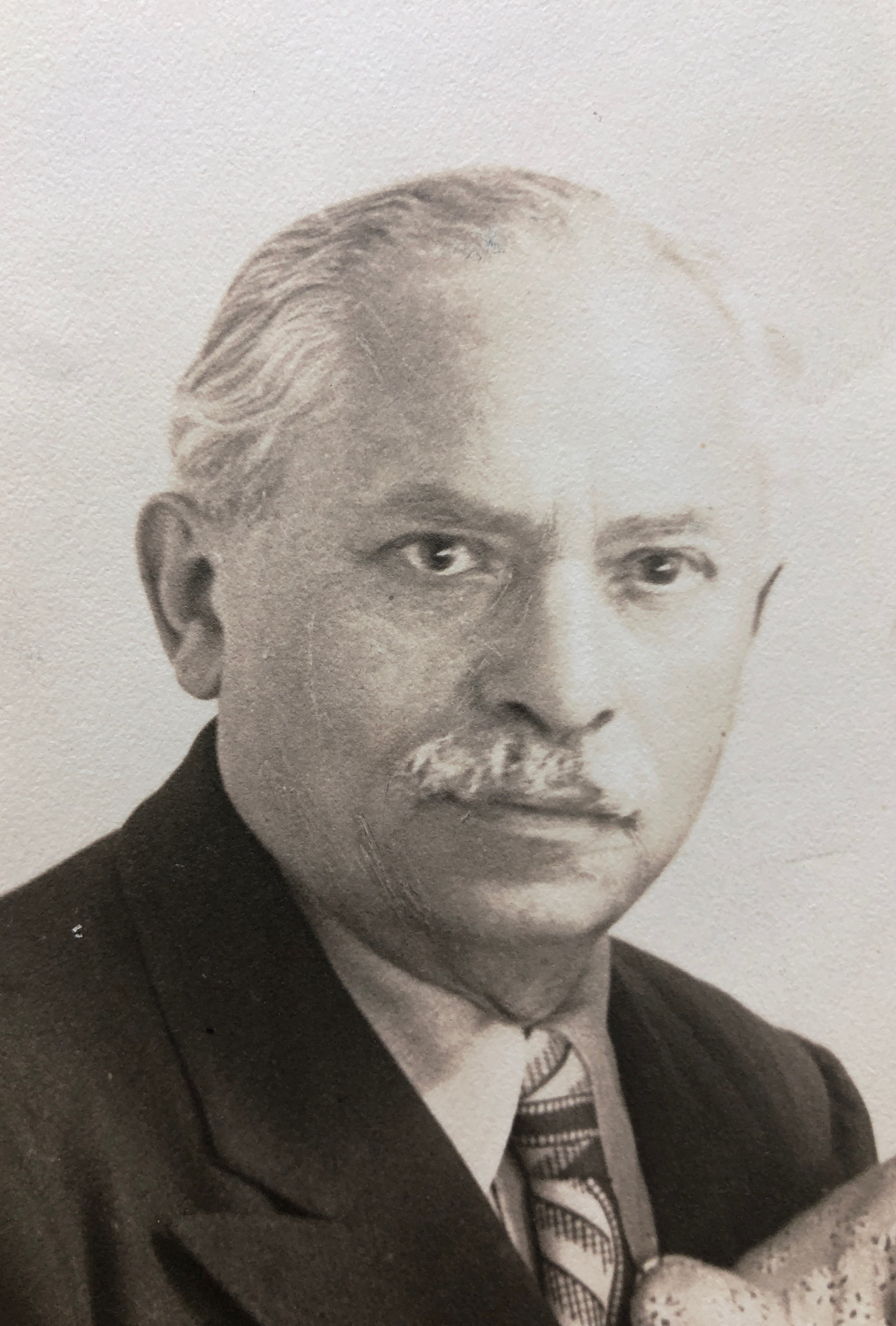
Portrait of Lipa Feingold later in life, date unknown

Lipa Feingold died on October 7, 1945. His personal archive was left with the University of Denver. After his death some of his compositions continued to circulate and appeared on albums by postwar performers such as Theodore Bikel and Leibele Waldman.
