= Stutchkoff =

Stutchkoff is a surname. Notable people with the surname include:

- Nahum Stutchkoff (1893–1965), Yiddish-Polish and later Yiddish-American actor, author, lexicographer, and radio host
- Misha Stutchkoff (1918–2003), American television and film screenwriter, radio performer, and actor; see Michael Morris (screenwriter)
