= Nahum Stutchkoff =

Yiddish-Polish-American actor, author, lexicographer and radio host

Nahum Stutchkoff (Note: Yiddish נחם סטוטשקאָװ [nɔxəm (nʊxəm) stʊtʃkɔv], originally Polish Nachum Stuczko or Yiddish נחם סטוטשקאָ [nɔxəm (nʊxəm) stʊtʃkɔ]) (born 7 June 1893 in Brok near Łomża, Russian Empire, now Poland; died 6 November 1965 in Brooklyn, New York City), was a Yiddish-Polish and later Yiddish-American actor, author, lexicographer, and radio host. The largest Yiddish dictionary ever to be finished was compiled by him: the Oytser fun der yidisher shprakh ("The Treasure [Thesaurus] of the Yiddish Language").

== Life and work ==
=== Childhood ===
Nahum Stutchkoff was born Nachum Stuczko (or Nokhem Stutshko in Yiddish) into a Chassidic family living in the northeast of Congress Poland ("Vistula Land") in the then Russian Empire. Only in America did he add a vov (װ-) to his Yiddish name and two -ff to his English name. The family moved to Warsaw in 1900, where Stutchkoff attended the traditional elementary school (cheder). He later studied at two Talmud academies (yeshivos), one in Łomża and one in Warsaw.

=== Theatre ===
At the age of 16 (in 1909), Stutchkoff had his first experience with Yiddish theatre. He broke off his traditional religious schooling to join the theatre company of the cultural organisation Hazomir (Hebrew for "the nightingale"), led by the author Isaac Leib Peretz. He gave his acting debut in Sholem Aleichem's Mentshn ("Humans") and went on to act with different troupes in Poland and Russia. In 1912 he was drafted for military service. After his release he was hired by Adolf Segal and from 1917 on he played at the Undzer vinkl theatre in Kharkiv (now Ukraine), which maintained a lively theatre scene in spite of the First World War and subsequently, the Russian Civil War. In 1921 the company was incorporated in a state theatre company which led to the group's break up. Stutchkoff joined the Yiddish State Theatre of Vitebsk (now Belarus). In 1923 he emigrated to the United States – with his wife Tsilye and his son Misha, born in 1918.

Stutchkoff performed on Yiddish stages in New York City (1923) and Philadelphia (1924–1925) before he became the secretary of the Yiddish Drama Club in 1926. In Russia he had translated pieces for the Yiddish theatre, in America he concentrated on writing and adapting operettas, comedies, and dramas for the Yiddish stage. He worked with many illustrious names of the Yiddish theatre, such as Molly Picon, Ludwig Satz, Sholom Secunda, Joseph Rumshinsky, and Menasha Skulnik. His work usually earned him more approval from the audiences than from the critics.

=== Radio ===
In 1931, Stutchkoff got his first post at a small radio station in Brooklyn, in a studio built by the owner of a women's clothing store. Shortly after that, he started work as an announcer at WLTH, where he soon took over a children's talent show from Sholom Secunda and renamed it Feter Nokhems yidishe sho ("Uncle Nahum's Yiddish hour").

Stutchkoff quickly became popular and was hired by WEVD in 1932, a radio station which had been bought by the Yiddish newspaper Forverts (The Jewish Daily Forward) after the American Socialist Party had founded it. In the three following decades, Stutchkoff worked as a writer, director, and host of about one dozen serial programs and produced thousands of advertisements for his sponsors. His melodramatic series Ba tate-mames tish ("At The Family Table"), on family conflicts, aired every Sunday in the 1930s. The program was so popular that Stutchkoff adapted it for the stage. He also wrote many comedies for radio, such as Eni un Beni ("Annie and Benny"), In a yidisher groseri ("In A Jewish Grocery Store"), In a freylekhn vinkl ("In A Happy Place"), and An eydem af kest ("A Son-In-Law, living with and supported by the wife's parents"). One could call these comedies the sitcoms of their time.

After the United States entered the Second World War in 1941, comedies of the type Stutchkoff wrote lost their popularity. He wrote the series Tsores ba laytn ("People's Worries") instead, which ended with a plea for donations to nursing homes and which ran for fifteen years. The only time he directly referred to the Holocaust was in a show called Der gehenem ("Hell") in 1943. The purpose of this show – it was funded by the Ministry of Finance – was the propagation of American war bonds.

From 1948, 615 episodes of Mame-loshn ("Native Language") aired, a program dedicated to the Yiddish tongue. Stutchkoff reminded his listeners of the rich Yiddish lexicon in countless anecdotes and dramatic scenes. The show was Stutchkoff's answer to the destruction of the European Jewry – Yiddish lost his 'father and mother' in the Holocaust; American Jewry was to take in the orphan. Another purpose of the show was the promotion of his Oytser (Thesaurus; see below). Finally, in 1951 Stutchkoff started a program on family drama A velt mit veltelekh ("A World With Small Worlds"). Stutchkoff worked in radio until 1958 or 1959.

=== Lexicography ===
Stutchkoff gained importance as a lexicographer: in 1931 he published a Yiddish rhyming dictionary (Gramen-leksikon), and, based on it, in 1950 a thesaurus of the Yiddish language followed (Oytser fun der yidisher shprakh). A Hebrew thesaurus (Otsar ha'safah ha'ivrit) was published posthumously in 1968. The latter was outdated by the time it was published, since it was based on the educated Hebrew of the European Jews rather than the modern everyday speech of Israel.

However, the Oytser fun der yidisher shprakh, which was arranged onomastically, is undisputedly Stutchkoff's main achievement. It remains even today the most extensive dictionary of the Yiddish language, containing approximately 90,000 single-word entries and 8,000 idioms (because of multiple designations it amounts to nearly 175,000 entries). The dictionary was meant to 'store' the Yiddish language, which was in danger of extinction after the Holocaust. Peter Mark Roget's English thesaurus served as an example; nonetheless, Stutchkoff reduced Roget's 1000 onomastic categories to 650. The dictionary received critical acclaim and 2000 copies were sold within the first year of its publication alone. It does not project purist language views; instead it includes 1500 Americanisms, 3000 Germanisms, 1000 Slavisms, 500 vulgarisms, 700 funny expressions, and 700 archaisms, dialectal words, slang words and Sovietisms. This inclusion of modern lexicon distinguished Stutchkoff's dictionary from other publications put out by the Institute for Jewish Research YIVO (Yidisher visnshaftlekher institut). Stutchkoff's decision to include those terms went against the advice of his publisher, Max Weinreich. However, some reviewers – among others Isaac Bashevis Singer – criticised the fact that Weinreich had designated certain terms as "not recommended", while others regretted that the Oytser included many artificial terms invented by the YIVO that were not in use in other circles.

The Oytser's broadsheet catalogue became the basis of the Groyser verterbukh fun der yidisher shprakh ("Great Dictionary of the Yiddish Language"), an even more extensive dictionary. Stutchkoff planned on compiling it with the linguists Yudel Mark and Judah A. Joffe and then publishing it at YIVO. In 1955, he left the project for personal and conceptual reasons after only three years: his pragmatic approach to lexicography was not compatible with Yudel Mark's scientific claim. Finally, only the first four parts of the Groyser verterbukh were published between 1961 and 1980. They covered all words starting with Aleph and most words starting with a vowel (in Yiddish orthography all words starting with /a/, /aj/, /ej/, /o/, /oj/ and /u/ are written with an Aleph).

=== Personal life ===
Stutchkoff's wife Tsilye (Celia) née Grenzer (1893–?) was also an actress and she later participated in the radio programs, as did their son Misha (1918–2003) and their daughter Esther (later married Baron, 1924–?). Misha also appeared in Yiddish movies and wrote English television programs for Hollywood, using the pseudonym Michael Morris. Stutchkoff's father is thought to have died before the Second World War, his mother and sister died in the Warsaw Ghetto. His brother Aaron was a rabbi in London.

Although he grew up in a traditional Jewish-Yiddish environment in Poland, Stutchkoff abandoned this way of life as an adolescent. However, the destruction of the European Jewry by the Nazis made him an energetic supporter of traditional Judaism and an adversary of assimilation in language and religion. He became more purist and conscientious in his use of Yiddish, and recommended a Jewish upbringing for children.

Stutchkoff was very gifted in languages. He grew up speaking Yiddish, Polish and Russian, and learned Hebrew, German and French at school. His grandchildren also claim that he learned English on his passage to America with the help of William Shakespeare, Mark Twain, and the Encyclopædia Britannica.

== Published work ==
=== Select publications ===
The catalogue raisonné by Burko and Seigel includes three dozens stage plays, including stage adaptations of Stutchkoff's own radio programs:

- Der shlang in Gan-eydn [The Serpent in Garden Eden] (drama, staged in the 1910s/1920s)
- Di tsvey kales [The Two Brides] (musical comedy, staged in 1925)
- Ver bin ikh? [Who Am Im?] (Comedy, staged 1925–1926)
- Mazl fun froyen [Women's Luck] (comedy, staged 1925–1926)
- A mol is geven [Once Upon A Time] (drama, staged in 1926)
- In roytn Rusland [In Red Russia] (drama, staged in 1928)
- As der rebe vil [What The Rebbe Wants] (operetta, staged in 1929)
- Der tsadik in pelts [The Wise Man in Fur] (musical comedy, staged in 1929)
- Oy, Amerike [Oh, America] (musical comedy, staged in 1930/1931)
- Ba tate-mames tish [At The Family Table] (two dramas, staged in 1938 and 1939)
- In a yidisher groseri [In A Jewish Grocery Store] (two dramas, staged in 1938 and 1939)

two dozens translations of plays in other languages, such as:

- Der yid fun Konstants (Der Jude von Konstanz [The Jew of Konstanz], by Wilhelm von Scholz, staged in the 1910s/1920s)
- Der ayngebildeter kranker (Le malade imaginaire [The Imaginary Invalid], by Jean-Baptiste Molière, staged in the 1910s/1920s)
- Interesn-shpil (Los intereses creados [The Bonds Of Interest], by Jacinto Benavente, staged 1917–1921)
- Hotel-virtn (La locanderia [The Female Innkeeper], by Carlo Goldoni, staged 1917–1921)
- Der ganev (Scrupules [Scruples], by Octave Mirbeau, staged 1917–1921)
- Der karger (L'avare [The Miser], by Jean-Baptiste Molière, staged 1921–1923)

more than ten radio shows produced for the WEVD, including:

- In a yidisher groseri [In A Jewish Grocery Store] (?–?, 159 episodes)
- Ba tate-mames tish [At The Family Table] (1935–1940, 136 episodes)
- Tsores ba laytn [People's Worries] (1944–1959?, 217 episodes)
- Mame-loshn [Native Language] (1948–?, 615 episodes) – published in print by Alec Eliezer Burko, New York 2014
- A velt mit veltelekh [A World With Small Worlds] (1951–?, 114 episodes)

uncounted advertisements (product placements and commercial sketches)

around a dozen texts for sheet music, which Abe Ellstein, Joseph Rumshinsky, and Sholom Secunda put to music

three books:

- Yidisher gramen-leksikon [Yiddish rhyming lexicon], New York 1931
- Oytser fun der yidisher shprakh [Thesaurus of the Yiddish language], New York 1950, unaltered reprint New York 1991
- Otsar ha'safah ha'ivrit [Thesaurus of the Hebrew language], New York 1968

=== Written estate ===
Stutchkoff's written estate is kept in the New York Public Library (New York City), the YIVO Institute for Jewish Research (New York City), the Library of Congress (Washington, D.C.), and the American Folklife Center (Washington, D.C.).

While the scripts for the radio programs still largely exist, only a few audio files have survived time. They were retrieved by the Yiddish Radio Project (under the direction of Henry Sapoznik) and are partly available on www.yiddishradioproject.org.

== Footnotes ==
Content in this edit is translated from the existing German Wikipedia article at de:Nahum Stutchkoff by the same author; see its history for attribution.
