= Bella Mysell =

Actress and lyricist in Yiddish theater

- Born: Bella Meisel; April 5, 1902; New York City, New York, U.S.
- Died: January 17, 1991 (aged 88); Chevy Chase, Maryland, U.S.
- Burial place: Mount Hebron Cemetery, New York City
- Occupations: Actress, Lyricist
- Known for: Contributions to Yiddish theatre
- Notable work: "My Son and I", "Mendl in Japan", "Papirossen", "Those Were the Days"
- Spouses: Alexander Olshanetsky; Herman Yablokoff

Bella Mysell (born Bella Meisel; April 5, 1902 - January 17, 1991) was an influential American figure on the Yiddish stage, known for her work as an actress and lyricist.

== Early life ==
Bella Mysell was born on April 5, 1902, in New York. Her foray into the arts was significantly shaped by her father, Hyman Meisel, an established actor. She attended a public school, learned Yiddish in a cheder and studied singing, playing the piano, mandolin and guitar. Her early exposure to music and performance arts, including her proficiency in various instruments and vocals, laid the foundation for her eventual ascent into the theater world. At thirteen years of age, she performed together with her father. Mysell used to sing solo and with accompaniment.

== Career ==
Mysell's professional career was marked by her engagement as a prima donna at the National Theatre in New York in 1926. Her debut in Lash-Sandler's operetta Mendl in Japan was just the beginning of a vibrant period that saw her performing in various esteemed theaters. During the 1930–31 season, she acted at the Prospect Theatre, and in 1932-33 she performed at the Hopkinson Theatre. Mysell was a member of The Hebrew Actors' Union.

== Notable works ==
- Mendl in Japan (1926) - An operetta written by Lash-Sandler.
- Papirossen (1936) - A short movie directed by Henry Lynn with actors Herman Yablokoff, Bella Mysell, and Sidney Lumet.
- My Son and I (1960) - A musical play in English and Yiddish with book by Herman Yablokoff, music by Sholom Secunda and lyrics by Bella Mysell.
- Those Were the Days (1990) - A musical by Bella Mysell.

== Personal life ==
Mysell married Alexander Olshanetsky (1892–1946), an American composer, conductor, and violinist. Later in life, she married Herman Yablokoff (1903–1981), an American actor, singer, composer, poet, playwright, director and producer.

Bella Mysell died on January 17, 1991, and was buried in Mount Hebron Cemetery in New York City.

== Legacy ==
Bella Mysell's contributions to the Yiddish theatre are well-recognized. She is remembered not just for her theatrical performances but also for her musical endeavors, such as her performance in the short film "Papirossen" in 1936. Her legacy as a significant voice in the Yiddish theatre is preserved and celebrated through various memorials and platforms. Herman Yablokoff and Bella Mysell have been honored with a star at the Yiddish Theater Walk of Fame on 2nd Avenue.
