= Alexander Olshanetsky =

Russian-American composer, conductor, and violinist

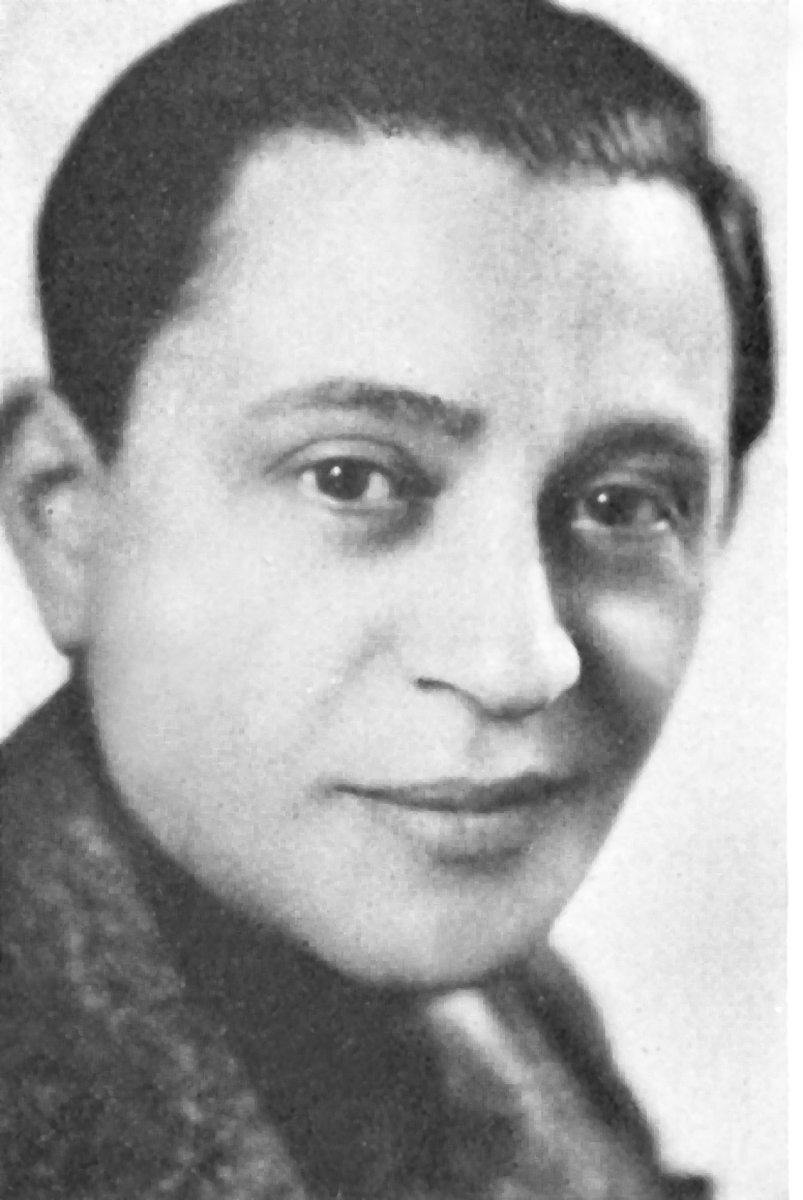
- Born: October 23, 1892; Odessa
- Died: June 3, 1946 (aged 53); Atlantic City
- Citizenship: Russian Empire; United States
- Occupations: composer, conductor, violinist
- Years active: 1911 – 1946

Alexander Olshanetsky (October 23, 1892 – June 3, 1946) was a Russian-American composer, conductor, and violinist. He was a major figure within the Yiddish theatre scene in New York City from the mid-1920s until his death in 1946.

== Biography ==
=== Early life and education ===
Olshanetsky was born in Odessa of Lithuanian Jewish descent into a non-musical family. After showing early talent on the violin, Olshanetsky studied from age 6 to 15 at the Odessa Royal Music School, studying multiple instruments. In 1911 he joined the orchestra of the Odessa Opera and Ballet Theater; notably touring with the ensemble throughout Imperial Russia. He quit to become chorusmaster for a touring operetta troupe in Russia.

During World War I, he was conscripted into the Czarist Army, and served as a regimental bandmaster stationed in Harbin, where there was a sizeable Jewish diaspora. While still serving in the army, he also became conductor of a local Yiddish theater troupe. In this capacity he began composing music. After the war, Olshanetsky joined another touring Russian operetta troupe, and performed in Japan, China, and India. He returned to Harbin in 1921 to find the Yiddish theater scene gone.

=== Immigration to the United States ===
In 1922 Olshanetsky emigrated to the United States, where he was introduced to the Yiddish theater scene by his uncle Hyman Mayzel, an actor and playwright. Within two years he had two shows produced: Hayntige Meydlekh (Today's Girls) written by Jacob Jacobs staged at Lenox Theater, and Zise Libe (Sweet Love) co-composed by Louis Gilrod and staged at Rolland's Liberty Theater. He quickly became a major presence in the Yiddish theatre scene, most notably several shows written by Jacob Jacobs and produced by Maurice Schwartz's Yiddish Art Theatre at the Louis Jaffe Art Theatre on 2nd Avenue in the heart of the Yiddish Theatre District. Revivals of most of his works occurred in major cities throughout the United States.

In 1925 he befriended and hired Dave Tarras to play in his show A Night in California which launched Tarras' career. The success of the subsequent recording of the show's songs I Like She and Petrograd led to Tarras joining Olshanetsky's orchestra full-time, and featuring prominently in several other Olshanetsky shows, including Der Litvisher Yankee which unprecedentedly scripted for the clarinet soloist to stand.

Olshanetsky immersed himself in the Yiddish music scene around New York as well. He arranged music for the Forverts Hour radio show, the radio branch of The Forward, and conducted for WABC's Der Tog Program. He formed an orchestra, established a booking office for the orchestra, and played throughout New York City and in the Borscht Belt. He served as the New Concord Hotel's first orchestral and choir director (upon invitation by Arthur Winareck, the establishment would later become the Concord Resort Hotel). His orchestra released several records. Dave Tarras claimed to have played on all these records.

=== Later years ===
By the 1930s, Yiddish music had become so popular that Olshanetsky and other composers and performers sought means to guarantee royalties, similar to how ASCAP provided for Broadway and Tin Pan Alley musicians. Because ASCAP denied membership to Yiddish musicians, in 1932 Olshanetsky, along with Sholom Secunda, Joseph Rumshinsky, Abraham Ellstein, Henry Lefkowitch, and Harry Lubin, founded the Society of Jewish Composers, Publishers and Songwriters; Olshanetsky is sometimes given credit for the concept. In 1940, the society aligned with the new performers rights' organization BMI, founded to assist artists rebuffed by ASCAP. By 1954, the decline of Yiddish music sales led to the Society for Jewish Composers' dissolution.

=== Death ===
Olshanetsky dropped dead of a heart attack in view of an audience of approximately 16,000 persons attending the opening session of the 37th annual convention of Rotary International. He was pronounced dead on arrival at Atlantic City hospital.

Olshanetsky's funeral service was held at the Louis Jaffe Art Theatre on 2nd Avenue. Rumshinsky directed the music, Moishe Oysher (for whom Olshanetsky had composed for the film Overture to Glory) was cantor, and Olshanetsky's Concord Hotel choir sang. A large banner was displayed in the hotel premises with the inscription, Olshy, we loved you too much! (This reference is drawn from his famous song Ikh Hob Dikh Tsu Fil Lib / I love you much too much). Thousands turned up for the funeral and parade down 2nd Avenue.

== Personal life ==
Olshanetsky often went by the nickname Shura (and is often credited in Brunswick Records catalogs as Shura). He was married to Bella Mysell, and had a daughter Anita. Bella Mysell remarried to Herman Yablokoff. Aaron Lebedeff was his cousin.

== Selected works ==
=== Theater ===
- Hayntige Meydlekh (Today's Girls), lyrics by Jacob Jacobs
- Zise Libe (Sweet Love), co-composed by Louis Gilrod
- A Night in California (A Nakht in Kalifornya), lyrics by Jacob Jacobs. First staged at the National Theater. Was Dave Tarras' first job in Yiddish theater, and starred Aaron Lebedeff.
- Paradise for Two
- The Golden Soldier, libretto by Isidore Lillian, 1925
- Goldene Tege (Golden Days)
- Der Livtisher Yankee (The Lithuanian Yankee)
- Di Katerinchik (The Organ Grinder), operetta, libretto by Louis Freiman
- Lucky Boy, lyrics by W. Siegel, 1935. Launched Leo Fuchs' American career.
- The Secret of Love, lyrics by F. Freiman and M. Edelheit
- The Wise Fool, lyrics by Louis Freiman
- Happy Days, lyrics by Louis Freiman
- The Laugh Maker
- The Only Night (Di Ainstige Nakht), lyrics by Jacob Jacobs
- Soul of a Woman, 1930
- What Girls Do, lyrics by Jacob Jacobs, 1935
- My Baby's Wedding

=== Films ===
- Overture to Glory (1940, directed by Max Nosseck). Includes the song Unter Boymer
- The Fighting Jew, a 1946 pageant staged at Madison Square Garden to celebrate the 50th anniversary of Jewish War Veterans of the United States.

=== Songs ===
- Ikh Hob Dikh Tsu Fil Lib (I Love You Much Too Much), lyrics by Chaim Towber, popular Yiddish tango from The Organ Grinder, originally performed by Luba Kadison. Later popularly sung in Yiddish by Seymour Rechtzeit, in English by Connie Francis, Dean Martin, and Ella Fitzgerald, and in a 1981 instrumental version by Carlos Santana that made the Rock & Roll Top 40 charts.
- Vilna (Vilnius), lyrics by Efraim-Leyb Wolfson
- Mein Shtetele Belz, lyrics by Jacob Jacobs. Originally written for Isa Kremer, in a failed attempt to persuade her to join their 1930 production of Ghetto Song. This nostalgic homage to the city of Belz become so popular that a city's people would substitute their own city for Belz, and the song is sometimes credited as simply Mein Shtetele. The melody was adapted by Polish lyricist Ludwik Starski for song Warszawo Ma (Oh Warsaw Mine), from the point of view of a Jew living in the Warsaw Ghetto.
- Shiroh, lyrics by Maurice Schwartz, from Schwartz's production Shabse Tzvi

== Legacy ==
After Olshanetsky's death, a scholarship in his name was endowed at Yeshiva University in New York. Among the scholarship's inaugural committee members were Charles Previn, Joseph Rumshinsky, and Maurice Schwartz.
