= Clara Young =

Clara Young may refer to:

- Clara Whipple Young (1887–1932), American film actress
- Clara Kimball Young (1890–1960), American film actress
- Clara Young (Yiddish theater) (1882–1952), Yiddish theatrical actor
