= Boaz Young =

Polish actor

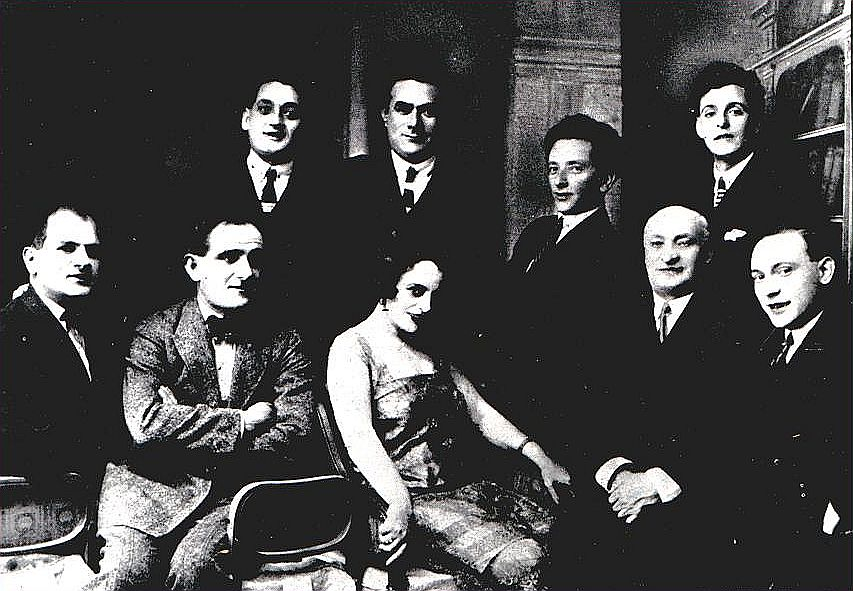
First row: Lachman, Wolkenstain, Winkler, Bankoff; second row: A. Chelif, A. Oberberg, Clara Young, Boaz Youngwitz, Ilia Trilling

Boaz Yungvits (Youngwitz), a.k.a. Bernard Young (born 1870 in Nowy Dwór, Poland) was a Polish actor.

== Biography ==
Young learned Russian, Polish, and German in childhood after studying and learning Hebrew with the Yanover Rav. In 1887, he became a supporter of the Tantsman-Spivakovski troupe in the Eldorado Theater and then moved to London where he was devoted to the Yiddish theatre troupe (Adler, Gradner, Max Rosenthal, and Abba Schoengold)

In 1889 he emigrated to the United States and joined a dramatic club, where Kopl Sender had produced Abraham Goldfaden's Doktor Almasado in which Boaz played "Bartelo" and with which he traveled to play in the provinces. In 1891 he played in Der yidisher kenig lir (The Jewish King Lear) then with Adler in the Roumania Opera House and in the Windsor Theater. In the 1910s he played in People's Theater, the Thalia theater, Kessler's Lyric Theater in Brooklyn and in 1911 starred with his wife in H. Meyzel's piece Di Bigamists a.k.a. Zayn Vayb's Man (His wife's lover).

The Youngs went to Europe, starring in Lemberg, Czernowitz, Iași, and Bucharest, then came back to America where Boaz helped create the Second Avenue Theater. He travelled to Warsaw, Poland several times with his wife Clara Young, playing at the Elizium Theater in Anshel Schorr and Joseph Rumshinsky's Di Amerikanerin, and at the Kaminski theater in Rakov in Rumshinsky's Khantshe in Amerike, Filips's Alma vu voynstu? and the German operetta Puptshik. In 1915 they played at the Bilgarov theater in Odessa and toured Roumania, then appearing in a musical he wrote, Jeykele the Bluffer. They then toured through Russia, particularly in Yekaterinoslav, Moscow, St. Petersburg, Odessa and Kiev, returning to New York and Brooklyn's Liberty Theater to star again in his Jeykele (with new music by Sholom Secunda), Dos Holand Vaybkhen, and Berele Tremp by Israel Rosenberg.

In 1923 he appeared in Toronto's Standard Theater; in 1924 he played in Warsaw's Di Rumenishe Khasene (The Rumanian Wedding) by Moyshe Shor, toured the Soviet Union, Argentina, played in Baltimore. He wrote articles about Yiddish theater in Russia and Poland for Di varhayt. He wrote a book of his memoirs in 1950.

== Filmography ==
- The Youth of Russia (1934 documentary)
- Tevya (1939)
