= The Bear Missed the Train =

"The Bear Missed the Train" is a parody on the popular song "Bei Mir Bistu Shein" and was written by the Smith Street Society Jazz Band. According to Joe Hanchrow, "Sometime around 1964, one of the musicians made an off-handed remark about Bei Mir Bist Du Schoen, calling it The Bear Missed The Train. Within minutes, the tune was written and performed." The song was used on radio shows. Al "Jazzbo" Collins used it as the theme on his late night jazz show in San Francisco. It also became a favorite on Jean Shepherd's radio program.
