= Eugene Secunda =

Academic in business and media studies

Eugene Secunda is an American academic who is a member of the faculty in the Department of Media, Culture & Communication at New York University. He is also an academic adviser in NYU's Gallatin School of Individualized Study. He previously served on the business school faculties of New York University, City University of New York and Adelphi University. Secunda was awarded New York University Teaching Excellence Awards in 2003 and 2018. He was awarded a Fulbright Scholarship Award to lecture at the University of Ljubljana in Slovenia in 2006. The co-author of Selling War to America: From the Spanish American War to the Global War on Terror and Shifting Time and Space: The Story of Videotape, He also has written articles for The Wall Street Journal, Los Angeles Times and New York Magazine, as well as for Advertising Age and Adweek. He was communications director for both the Campaign to Save Grand Central Station and the annual New York Cares Coat Drive.

== Early life and career ==
=== Education ===
Born in Brooklyn in 1934 to musician Sholom Secunda and Betty Secunda, Eugene Secunda was raised on New York's Lower East Side and in northern Manhattan. He earned his bachelor's degree in journalism at New York University in 1956, his master's degree in Communications at Boston University in 1962 and his Ph.D. in Media Studies at New York University in 1988. He served two tours of active duty in the U.S. Army. During that time, he was trained in propaganda at the U.S. Army Information School.

=== Career ===
Secunda began his career as a newspaper and radio reporter in the U.S., the Middle East and Europe, then was a police reporter for the New London Day newspaper, New London, Ct. He later became a marketing executive promoting many Broadway theater productions, as well as for films at 20th Century Fox and Universal Film Studios.

Secunda was with the J. Walter Thompson Company for 16 years, supervising a variety of advertising and public relations accounts in the U.S. and global markets, and as J. Walter Thompson's Senior Vice President, Director of World-wide Corporate Communications. He also founded the agency's Entertainment Advertising Division. In 1980, he joined N. W. Ayer & Son International advertising agency in 1980 as Senior Vice President and Division Manager. He left in 1982 and co-founded his own agency, Barnum-Secunda Associates, where he served as President, and in 1985, established a consultancy, Secunda Marketing Communications, serving clients in the marketing and media industries.

In the 1990s, Secunda was Director of Corporate Communications of Central European Media Enterprises, a London-based media company.

Secunda works as a Professor of Media Studies at New York University and continues his work in communications-related authorship and participation of community affairs.

=== Personal life ===
He has lived in Greenwich Village, New York City with his wife Shirley for more than five decades and has two children, Ruthanne and Andrew.

== Awards and affiliations ==
- NYU Steinhardt Teaching Excellence Award, 2006 and 2018.
- Fulbright Scholar Lecturing Grant Award, University of Ljubljana, Slovenia, 2006.
- Lubin Scholarly Research Award, Pace University, for AA Survey of Senior Agency, Advertiser, and Media Executives on the Future of Advertising, Journal of Current Issues and Research in Advertising, 18, No. 1 (Spring), 1996, 1-19. (with Rob Ducoff and Dennis Sandler).

== Publications ==
=== Books ===
- Shifting Time & Space: The Story of Videotape, with Co-Author
- Selling War to America: From the Spanish American War to the Global War on Terror, with Co-Author

=== Chapters ===
- Social and Cultural Aspects of VCR Use: An Historic Perspective
- Publicity Forum: Advice from 22 Experts

=== Journal articles ===
- Secunda, Eugene; Ducoffe, Robert (Spring 1996). ""A Survey of Senior Agency, Advertiser and Media Executives on the Future of Advertising" (18)". Journal of Current Issues and Research in Advertising. 1.
- Secunda, Eugene (1995). "A Commentary Marketers' Use of Disguised Forms of Product Promotion to Compensate for the Loss of Traditional Advertising's Effectiveness". Journal of Marketing Communications. 1 (3): 163–174. doi:10.1080/13527269500000016.
- Secunda, Eugene (1994). "Brand Marketing The First Private National Commercial TV Station in Central Europe". The Journal of Product & Brand Management. 1 (2).
- Secunda, EUgene (Spring 1994). "How Advertisers View Network Television's Audience Erosion and Commercial Avoidance Problems: A Survey of Major Sponsors". Journal of Media Planning.
- Secunda, Eugene (1994). "Freedom of Choice and the Future of Latinobrand". Journal of Global Marketing. 7 (3): 149–156. doi:10.1300/J042v07n03_08.
- Secunda, Eugene (Spring 1992). "Media Planning Concerns in a Blurred Editorial/Programming Environment". Journal of Media Planning. 7.
- Secunda, Eugene (1992–1993). "Why Advertising and Public Relations Aren't Friends: An Examination of the Enmity Between the Disciplines". Journal of Corporate Public Relations. 3: 16–19.
- Secunda, Eugene (1993). "Consumer Attitudes Towards Product Placement in Movies: A Preliminary Study". International Journal of Advertising. 12 (1).
