= Nissan Spivak =

Nissan Spivak ניסן סְפִּיבַק
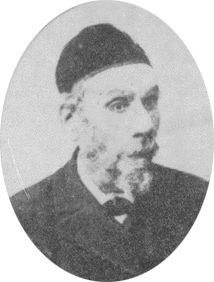

Background information
- Born: 1824; Novaya Mysh, Russian Empire (present-day Belarus)
- Died: 1906 (aged 81–82) Chernivtsi, Austria-Hungary (present-day Ukraine)
- Genres: Liturgical
- Occupations: Cantor; Composer
- Instrument: Singing

Nissan Spivak (Note: Romanian: Nisan Spivak; Yiddish: ניסן סְפִּיבַק, romanized: Nisan Spivaḳ; Ukrainian: Ніссан Співак, romanized: Nissan Spivak) (1824 – 1906, born Nissi Belzer) (Note: Yiddish: נִיסִי בֶּלְזֶר, romanized: Nisan Belzer; Romanian: Nisan Belțer; Ukrainian: Ніссан Белцер, romanized: Nissan Beltser) was a Jewish cantor and composer.

== Career ==
Born in Novaya Mysh, he was cantor in Bălţi (Beltsy), Bessarabia, and was generally known as ‘Nisn Beltzer’. Later he was cantor at Kishinev (Bessarabia) and from 1877 at Berdychiv (now in Ukraine).

In his childhood he had an accident which damaged his voice but he had an extensive reputation primarily as a composer and choir conductor. It was his vocal handicap that led him to develop original synagogue music in which the choir, instead of being merely an accompaniment or used for responses, was assigned lengthy ensembles - with solos and duets - reducing the role of the cantor. Spivak attracted many students to Berdychiv, including Boris Thomashefsky and Lipa Feingold, and took his choirs to other centers, including Hasidic courts.

Spivak died in Ukraine and was survived by his son Joseph Spivak.

== Bibliography ==
- Friedmann, Jonathan L. (2012). Synagogue Song: An Introduction to Concepts, Theories and Customs. McFarland. p. 152. ISBN 978-0-7864-9136-0.
