= The Golden Bride =

1923 Yiddish language musical

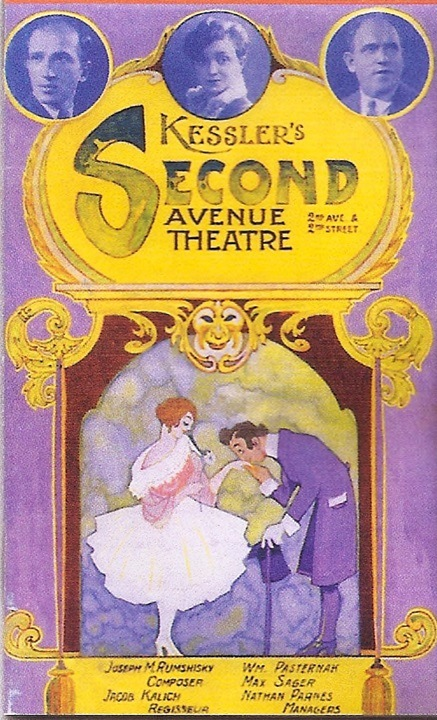
Program cover for the original 1923 production of Die Goldene Kale.

The Golden Bride (Yiddish: Die Goldene Kale) is a 1923, Yiddish language musical, or operetta. It was revived in 2015 and again in 2016 by the Folksbiene National Yiddish Theatre in New York. The production received two Drama Desk nominations, one for Best Revival of a Musical and for Best Director for Bryna Wasserman and Motl Didner.

Die Goldene Kale premiered in 1923 with music by Joseph Rumshinsky, lyrics by Louis Gilrod and a book by Frieda Freiman at Kessler's Second Avenue Theater, on New York's Lower East Side. The popular show was produced in Yiddish-speaking communities in Europe, North and South America for a quarter of a century, but forgotten after its last run in 1948.

== History ==
In the early 1990s, musicologist Michael Ochs, discovered parts of the operetta's score and libretto in an archive at Harvard's Loeb Music Library where he was the Richard F. French Music Librarian. He translated it into English and it was displayed as part of an exhibition, then returned to storage. Ochs was searching for some of the musical's missing text in the archive at the Yidisher Visnshaftlekher Institut in New York, when the archivist, Chana Mlotek, suggested that he should speak to her son, Zalmen, artistic director of the National Yiddish Theatre Folksbiene. Ochs and Mlotek were eventually able to assemble a "lead sheet, individual parts, a typescript of the dialogue and 13 recordings" of parts of the score, including some made by the original cast. The first production of the revived musical was held in the theater of the Museum of Jewish Heritage. It was directed by National Yiddish Theatre Folksbiene Artistic Director Bryna Wasserman and co-directed by Associate Artistic Director Motl Didner with choreography by Merete Muenter. A second encore production ran over the summer of 2016, with the same creative team.

== Plot synopsis ==
Di Goldene Kale (The Golden Bride) is a 1923 comic operetta, written in the style of Gilbert and Sullivan and Viennese Operetta with elements of klezmer, Jewish cantorial music, Eastern European folk music, ragtime and jazz. Di Goldene Kale was the hit show of 1923, running for 18 weeks at Kessler's 2nd Avenue Theater, a 2,000 seat house in the heart of the “Jewish Broadway.” This run was followed by national and international tours and had several revivals through the 1930s and 1940s.

The story of Di Goldene Kale, The Golden Bride, opens a door into a time that no longer exists.

The first act is set in Russian Jewish village (shtetl) where the beautiful Goldele, who was abandoned as a child, has learned that she has inherited a fortune from her father who had gone off to America shortly after her birth. She plans to embark on a journey across the globe to claim her father's estate and meet her birth mother, whilst potentially finding love along the way. She is suddenly pursued by every young man from her village, including the handsome university student Misha, whom she loves. But Goldele announces that she will marry whoever can find her long lost mother.

The second act brings Goldele and several friends across the sea, seeking to go from rags to riches and live the American Dream. They are adapting to the hustle and bustle of New York City. The would-be grooms converge, but which one of them has found Goldele's mother and with it, the hand of the Golden Bride?

== Songs ==
Mayn Goldele, sung by the male lead, was a major Yiddish hit song in the 1920s.
