= All or Nothing at All =

1938 song by Arthur Altman and Jack Lawrence

Single by Harry James Orchestra, vocal Frank Sinatra
- B-side: Flash
- Published: June 20, 1939 by Leeds Music Corporation
- Released: August 2, 1940, May 24, 1943
- Recorded: August 31, 1939
- Studio: Columbia Studios, New York City
- Genre: Swing
- Length: 2:57
- Label: Columbia 35587
- Composer: Arthur Altman
- Lyricist: Jack Lawrence

Harry James Orchestra, vocal Frank Sinatra singles chronology
"I've Heard That Song Before" (1942)	"All or Nothing at All" (1940)	"Velvet Moon / Prince Charming" (1943)

"All or Nothing at All" is a song composed in 1939 by Arthur Altman, with lyrics by Jack Lawrence.

== Frank Sinatra recording ==
Frank Sinatra's August 31, 1939 recording of the song, accompanied by Harry James and his Orchestra was a huge hit in 1943, when it was reissued by Columbia Records during the 1942-44 musicians' strike. The record topped the Billboard charts in 1943 during a 21-week stay and sold over a million copies. On the Harlem Hit Parade chart, "All or Nothing at All" went to number eight.
