= Herman Yablokoff =

Belarusian-born Jewish American actor, singer, and writer

- Born: Chaim A. Yablonik; August 11, 1903; Grodno, Russian Empire (now Belarus)
- Died: April 3, 1981 (aged 77); New York City, United States
- Occupations: Stage actor, singer, composer, poet, director and producer of Yiddish theatre
- Years active: 1913–1981

Herman Yablokoff (August 11, 1903 – April 3, 1981, Yiddish: הערמאַן יאַבלאָקאָף, Russian: Герман Яблоков, born Chaim Yablonik, Хаим Яблоник), sometimes written Herman Yablokov, Herman Yablokow, etc., was a Belarusian-born Jewish American actor, singer, composer, poet, playwright, director and producer who became one of the biggest stars in Yiddish theatre.

== Biography ==
He was born into a poor family in Grodno (Hrodna), then a predominantly Polish town in the Russian Empire, now within Belarus. His parents were Alter Yablonik, a road paver, and Riva-Lei Shillingoff, and he received a traditional Jewish religious education in cheder and yeshiva. He sang in the choir of Cantor Yoshe Slonimer at the age of ten, and at the age of 12 began performing in the local Jewish theatre. In 1920 he left home to join a Yiddish theatre group, the Kovner Fareynikte Trup (United Troupe of Kovno) traveling around the cities and towns of Lithuania, Poland and Germany.

In 1924 he emigrated to North America and began performing in theatres in Toronto, Montreal and Los Angeles, finally settling in New York City. Yablokoff joined the Hebrew Actors Union in 1931, and later served several terms as the organization's president. In the 1930s and 1940s, he was one of the most influential personalities in the Second Avenue theatre world, in the heyday of American theatre in Yiddish. He wrote, directed and produced a show, Der Payatz ("The Clown"), which brought him much success and acclaim, and he popularized the role through weekly appearances on Yiddish radio in New York. Another of his plays, Papirosn ("Cigarettes") in 1935, featured the song of the same name which he had been inspired to write in 1922, after seeing children peddling cigarettes during the pogroms in Grodno after the First World War. Thanks to its traditional folk tune and sentimental words, the song became very popular.

Yablokoff also wrote the song "Shvayg mayn harts" ("Be Still, My Heart"). Yablokoff took legal action to win a financial settlement from eden ahbez, claiming that ahbez had adapted this song into his hit "Nature Boy". In the end they settled out of court.

He toured widely, including trips to Europe and South America, often with his wife, the actress and singer Bella Mysell (1902-1991). In 1947, after the end of the Second World War, he toured displaced persons (DP) camps in Germany, Austria and Italy, giving over 100 performances for 180,000 homeless Jewish refugees. In one camp he found his niece, the only survivor of his family after the Holocaust. He received the US Army Certificate of Merit for his work in refugee camps.

His final musical, which he wrote, staged and directed, was "My Son and I", in 1960. His autobiography, Der Payatz: Around the World with Yiddish Theatre, won the Zvi Kesel Prize for Yiddish literature in 1970. Yablokoff became president of the Yiddish Theatrical Alliance and chairman of the Yiddish National Theater in New York.

He was married to Bella Mysell, who had been previously married to Yiddish theater composer Alexander Olshanetsky. He died in Mount Sinai Hospital, New York City, in 1981, aged 77, and was buried in Mount Hebron Cemetery.

== Works ==
=== Musicals ===
- Der Payatz (1934)
- The King of Song
- Papirossen (1935)
- Goldela Dem Bakers (1940)
- Mein Veise Blum
- Der Dishwasher (1936)
- My Son and I

=== Autobiography ===
- Der Payatz: Around the World with Yiddish Theatre
