= Sholom Secunda =

- Born: Shloyme Abramovich Sekunda; 4 September [O.S. 23 August] 1894
- Origin: Aleksandriya, Kherson Governorate, Russian Empire
- Died: June 13, 1974 (aged 79) New York, United States
- Occupation: Composer

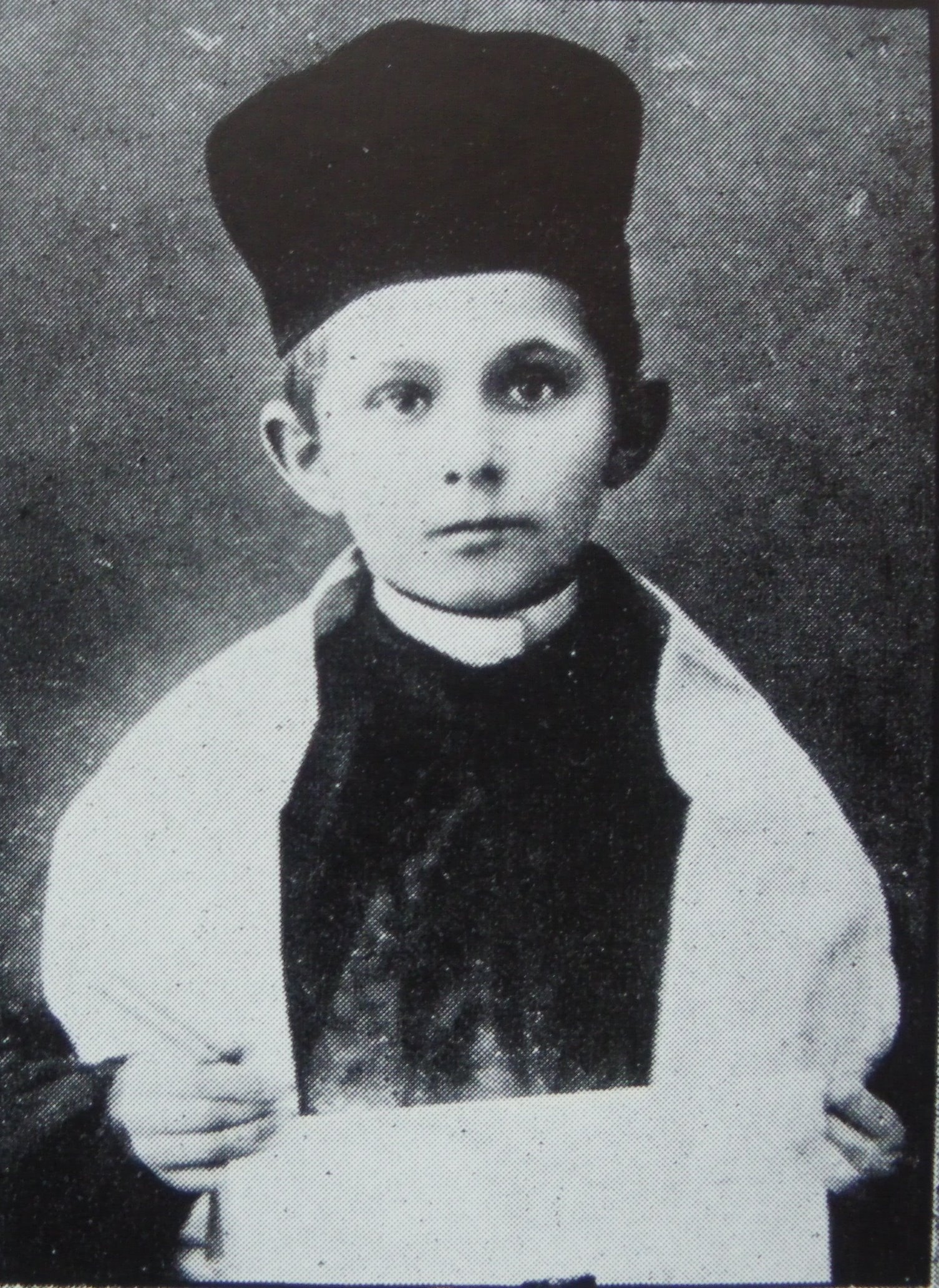
Sholom Secunda as a "wonder child" khazn

Sholom Secunda (Yiddish: שלום סעקונדאַ, 4 September [O.S. 23 August] 1894, Alexandria, Kherson Governorate, Russian Empire – 13 June 1974, New York) was an American composer of Ukrainian-Jewish descent, best known for the tunes of "Bei Mir Bistu Shein" and "Donna Donna".

== Biography ==
He was born in 1894 as Shloyme Abramovich Sekunda (Russian: Шлойме Абрамович Секунда) in Aleksandria city, Kherson Governorate, Russian Empire (now in Ukraine) to the family of Abram Secunda and Anna Nedobeika. In 1897, the family moved to the Black Sea port city of Mykolaiv, where they opened an iron bed factory.

At age 12, Shloyme played Abraham/Avrom in Abraham Goldfaden's Akeydes Yitskhok (The Sacrifice of Isaac) and Markus in The Kishef-Makherin (The Sorceress).

In 1907, like many other Jews of the Russian Empire (see History of the Jews in Russia), he and his family emigrated to the United States after a series of pogroms in 1905. In January 1908, the family arrived to New York as steerage passengers on board the SS Carmania and were inspected and briefly detained on Ellis Island. In New York City (they first lived on East 127th Street where his father had settled before sending for his wife and children), young Sholom became a noted child khazn (cantor). When his voice changed he studied music and taught piano, then worked in a comedy theater in the chorus until his song "Amerike" was accepted by Jennie Goldstein, who sang it in Kornblum's Unzere kinder (Our Children).

In 1913, after studying at the Institute for Musical Arts in New York City (predecessor to the Juilliard School), he worked at the Odeon Theater as chorist and composer; 1914 saw the premier of "Yoysher, music by Sholom Secunda and Solmon Shmulevitsh". He began working in "lyric theater" as choir director, then as director and orchestrator of the old "historic" operetta repertoire; he studied orchestration for a year under Ernest Bloch. In 1918, he became a naturalized US citizen.

In 1919-1920, he earned his first solo composer's credits with S. H. Kon's The Rabbi's Daughter and Free Slaves. He worked in Philadelphia's Metropolitan Opera House with director Boris Thomashevsky; in 1921-22 he was director and composer at Clara Young's Liberty Theater. He composed for the musical Di Yidishe Shikse by Anshel Schorr (1927) and A nakht fun libe (A Night of Love) by Israel Rosenberg. An exhaustive list of his many works can be found in the Leksikon fun Yidishn Teater.

In 1932, he wrote the melody for the popular song "Bay mir bistu sheyn" on the lyrics of Jacob Jacobs for the musical performed at the Parkway Theatre in Brooklyn, which later became a major hit for the Andrews Sisters. Together with Aaron Zeitlin, he wrote the famous Yiddish song "Dos kelbl (The Calf)" (also known as "Donna Donna") which was covered by many musicians, including Donovan and Joan Baez.

Along with Abraham Ellstein, Joseph Rumshinsky, and Alexander Olshanetsky, he was one of the "big four" composers of his era in New York City's Second Avenue National Theater (Yiddish theatre) scene in the Yiddish Theater District. These composers banded together in 1932 to protect their royalties through the Society of Jewish Composers, Publishers and Songwriters. Secunda also worked at another theater founded by Maurice Schwartz (an emigrant from the Russian Empire), Yiddishe Art Theater, earning $75/week for conducting an orchestra. In 1938, he gave an interview to the Courier-Post about the hit song, "Bei Mir Bistu Shein".

== Personal life ==
Secunda married the former Betty Almer, and they had two sons, Sheldon and Eugene Secunda. He died on June 13, 1974, in New York City, and was buried in Montefiore Cemetery in Springfield Gardens, Queens.

== Works ==
=== Filmography ===
- 1930 : Sailor's Sweetheart
- 1931 : A Cantor on Trial
- 1939 : Kol Nidre
- 1939 : Tevya
- 1940 : The Jewish Melody
- 1940 : Her Second Mother
- 1940 : Motel the Operator
- 1940 : Eli, Eli
- 1950 : God, Man and Devil
- 1950 : Catskill Honeymoon

=== Operas ===
- I Would If I Could (1933), musical (associated song: Bei Mir Bistu Shein)
- Esterke (1940), musical (with the song Dos Kelbl (Donna Donna))

=== Autobiography ===
- Sholom Secunda Tells ...
