= Nikolai Minkh =

Soviet composer, conductor, pianist

Nikolay Grigoryevich Minkh (Russian: Николай Григорьевич Минх) (March, 28 (15), 1912, Saratov – November 2, 1982, Moscow) was a Soviet composer, conductor, and pianist.
