= Lou Levy (publisher) =

American music publisher (1910–1995)

Lou Levy (né Louis Levy; December 3, 1910, Queens, New York City – October 31, 1995, Manhattan) was a music publisher during the Tin Pan Alley era of American popular music.

== Career ==
Levy established Leeds Music Corporation in 1935 with his friends, lyricist Sammy Cahn and composer Saul Chaplin. He is credited with the discoveries of Cahn and Chaplin, Bob Dylan, Charles Strouse, Richard Adler and Jerry Ross, and Henry Mancini. He also either discovered, managed, or developed the careers of such artists as the Ames Brothers, Petula Clark, Bobby Darin, Eddie Fisher, Connie Francis, Woody Herman, Steve Lawrence, Les Paul, The Andrews Sisters, Buddy Rich, and Charles Aznavour.

Levy supplied numerous other singers with hit material: Frank Sinatra with "All or Nothing At All," "Strangers in the Night," and "I'll Never Smile Again"; Petula Clark with "Downtown" and "Call Me"; The Everly Brothers with "Let It Be Me"; Tom Jones with "It's Not Unusual". He published the Beatles' first American hit, "I Want to Hold Your Hand." In 1964, Leeds Music was acquired by MCA.

=== Professional stewardship ===
Levy served on the Board of Directors of ASCAP from 1958 to 1970 and was honored by ASCAP in 1986 for "outstanding contributions as a major force in music publishing." In 1987 he received the Songwriters Hall of Fame Abe Olman Award for Excellence in Music Publishing.

== Family ==
On July 27, 1941, Levy, who was then managing and often credited as the "discoverer" of the Andrews Sisters, eloped with Maxene Anglyn Andrews (1916–1995) in Elkton, Maryland. The marriage was kept private and first became public when Andrews disclosed it in 1943. They divorced March 10, 1949, in Los Angeles.

== Bibliography ==
=== References ===
- Atlanta Journal (The) (May 16, 1943). Andrews Sister Reveals Elopement (INS). Vol. 61, no. 82 (final ed.). p. 16 (digital image 42; Section C, column 5, bottom) – via Newspapers.com. LCCN sn82-15426; ISSN 2473-1625; OCLC 8807964 (all editions).
- Independent (The); Vosburgh, Dick (October 28, 1995). "Obituary: Maxene Andrews".
- New York Times (The). LCCN sn00-61556; ISSN 0362-4331, ISSN 1553-8095 (online).
1. Calta, Louis (November 26, 1964). "MCA Buys Leeds, Music Publisher – Entertainment Concern Gets Assets and Copyrights". Vol. 114, no. 39023 (Late City ed.). p. 52 (columns 4–5, top).
  1. Via NYTimes blog.
  2. Via TimesMachine.
  3. Pdf via TimesMachine (PDF).
  4. Permalink via TimesMachine.
2. Grimes, William (November 4, 1995). "Lou Levy, 84, Publisher of Decades of Hit Songs". Vol. 145, no. 50235 (Late City ed.). p. 54 (digital image 51, columns 4–6, middle). ProQuest 430414634.
  1. Via NYTimes blog.
  2. Via TimesMachine.
  3. Permalink via TimesMachine.
- Continuum Encyclopedia of Popular Music of the World (1st phase: 8 Vols.). John Shepherd (born 1947); David Horn (born 1942) (eds.). Continuum International Publishing Group. 2003. LCCN 2002-74146; OCLC 276305981 (all editions).
1. Sanjek, David (1952–2011). Vol. 1: "Media, Industry and Society". Part II, Chapter 15: "Publishing": "Leeds Music Corporation". p. 588. ISBN 978-0-8264-6321-0, 0-8264-6321-5 (Vol. 1).
  1. Via Internet Archive (limited preview; Trinity Library).
  2. Via Google Books (limited access).
- Vallejo Times Herald (March 11, 1949). Maxene Andrews Divorces Agent (AP). Vol. 74, no. 70. p. 6 (column 2) – via Newspapers.com. LCCN sn93-51531; OCLC 28492289 (all editions).
