= Kammen Brothers =

J. & J. Kammen Music Company, commonly known as the Kammen Brothers, was a sheet music publishing company operated in Brooklyn, New York by Jack and Joseph Kammen from the 1920s to the 1970s. The company published Jewish music (including Klezmer and Yiddish theatre music) as well as non-Jewish music. They owned the rights to some well-known songs such as Bei Mir Bistu Shein. Their Klezmer Fake books were by far the most popular of their time, offering arranged interpretations of Jewish wedding repertoire for non-specialist musicians.

== History ==
=== Jack and Joseph Kammen ===
Jack and Joseph Kammen were twin brothers, born Yakov and Yosef Kamenetzky in Białystok, Grodno Governorate, Russian Empire (today located in Poland) on October 11, 1888. They emigrated to the United States as children in 1894 or 1895 along with their parents Max and Hinda; the family became naturalized U. S. citizens in 1905. Their father worked as a musician in the United States; both Jack and Joseph as well as their younger brother Herman (Hyman) took it up as a career too. Jack made his entry into the world of Jewish music arranging at age 16 when he started producing work for Theodore Lohr Co. in 1904; he then became arranger for the popular Yiddish-language parody songwriter David Meyerowitz. In 1910 Jack, Jacob and their brother Herman changed their names from Kamenetzky to Kammen.

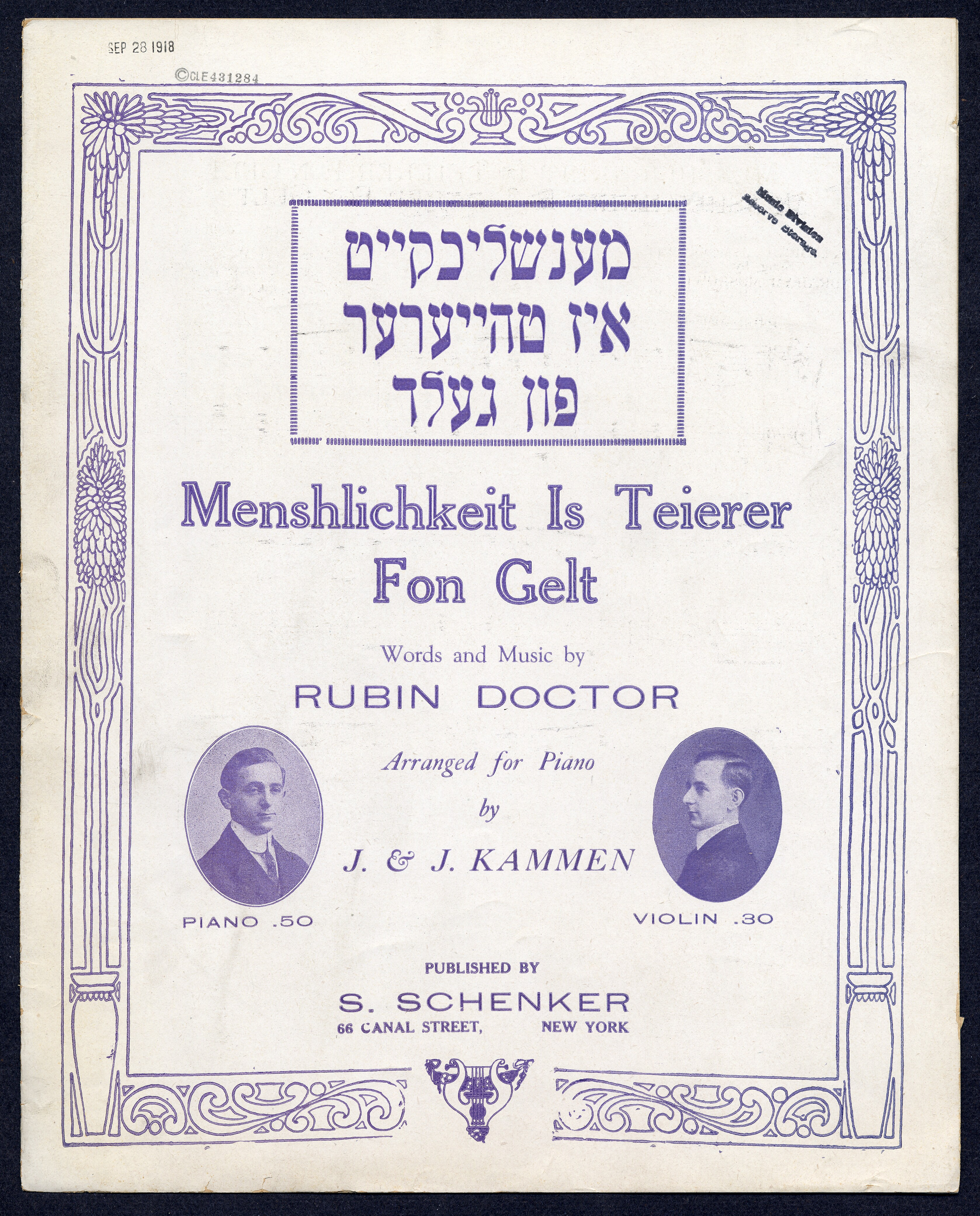
Cover of Menshlichkeit is teierer fon gelt score, S. Schenker, 1919

The brothers recorded at least one disc for Emerson Records' Jewish series in around 1920, which consisted of them playing a piano duet of Russian and Jewish music.

Jack Kammen died in New York in March 1969. It is unclear when Joseph died.

=== J. & J. Kammen Music Company ===
The earliest Jewish music publishing house in the United States was Katzenelenbogen and Rabinowitz at the turn of the twentieth century, followed by a large number of other companies, including Theodore Lohr, Albert Teres, and the Hebrew Publishing Company. By the 1920s, two new companies came to dominate the market: Henry Lefkowitch's Metro Music and J. & J. Kammen. The Kammen brothers seem to have launched their music company in around 1919: J. & J. Kammen, based in Brooklyn, New York. They soon began to publish arrangements of popular Jewish, Eastern European and cosmopolitan music. Their Dance Folio volumes quickly became the most popular lead sheets for Jewish wedding music in the United States. They continued to produce new volumes of the series for decades, with at least fifteen folios printed in separate editions for different instruments (violin and mandolin, piano, cornet, B flat clarinet, etc.).

The Great Depression hit the company hard, as it did many businesses; J. & J. Kammen declared bankruptcy in 1932. However, the company recovered and became even more successful by the end of the decade; the popularity of Bei Mir Bistu Shein, which the Kammens had bought the rights to for $30 and sold to a subsidiary of Warner Bros., caused a boom in adaptations of Jewish music for popular audiences, and a huge increase in sales for the company.

During the 1930s and 1940s the Kammens filed a number of lawsuits to protect their songs from infringement; one suit against T. B. Harms in 1935 claimed the popular song Isle of Capri was derivative of a Nellie Casman song they owned called Yossel, Yossel. A 1940 suit against Edward B. Marks and RCA claimed that the popular song Bublichki was an infringement of their 1929 song Beigelach, koift beigelach; it was eventually settled. And a 1948 suit claimed that Nature Boy infringed the copyright of their song "Be Still my Heart", which had been written by Herman Yablokoff.

After the death of the brothers, J. & J. Kammen seems to have ceased publication by the 1970s. However, their score collections continued to be reprinted and to circulate in photocopied versions, becoming an important source of tunes for the revival of Klezmer music in the 1970s and onwards.

== Selected publications ==
- Kammen international dance folio no. 1: big collection of carefully selected international songs and dances good for all occasions. (1924)
- Jewish theatre songs: a collection of recognized songs successes by the foremost Jewish writers. (1925)
- Kammen's Jewish selection. No. 2, A medley overture containing the most popular Jewish song successes in the world (1926, arranged by Louis Katzman)
- J. & J. Kammen's Jewish Dance Folio no. 5: a collection of up-to-date frailachs (1928, arranged by Jack Stillman)
- Kammen international: dance and concert folio no. 9: a collection of famous international songs, dances, medleys, selections and overture (1934, arranged by Jack Kammen and William Scher)
- Kammen Selection no. 14: a medley overture (arranged by Dave Kaplan)
- The Kammen folio of famous Jewish theater songs: a collection of popular song hits of yesterday (1940s)
- 25 favorite Jewish songs: a collection of favorite old time hits tunes. (1953, arranged by Joseph Kammen and Ben Jaffe)
