= Louis Freiman =

Playwright in Yiddish theater

- לואיס פריימאַן
- Born: Leyzer Genyuk; 1892; Ostropolye, Volhynian Governorate, Russia
- Died: January 30, 1967 (aged 74–75); New York City
- Citizenship: Russian Empire; United States
- Occupation(s): Playwright, Vaudeville Actor
- Known for: Contributions to Yiddish theatre
- Notable work: "Der roiter shabes", "Der blinder moler (The Blind Painter)", "Ir groyser sud (Her Great Secret)"

Louis Freiman (Yiddish: לואיס פריימאַן, 1892 — January 30, 1967) was a Yiddish theatre playwright.

== Early life and career ==
Louis Freiman, originally named Leyzer Genyuk, was born in 1892 in Ostropolye, Volhynian Governorate, Russia. His father was a contractor. He received education in cheders, a yeshiva, and a municipal school in Alt Konstantin. Additionally, he sang with a cantor. In 1907, at the age of 15, he was brought to St. Louis by a cousin, where he adopted his mother's family name.

Freiman established a Yiddish dramatic association. He wrote two one-act plays for the association.

== Contributions to Yiddish theatre ==
In 1911, Freiman went to Chicago. Here, he became a part of the Yiddish vaudeville troupe led by Philip Weisenfreund (who was the father of Paul Muni), contributing over three seasons as an actor and playwright. During this period, he penned numerous vaudeville pieces performed by the troupe.

Parallel to his vaudeville contributions, Freiman was also engaged in writing plays. Among these, Der blinder moler (The Blind Painter) emerged as a significant work. Staged in the Folks Theatre by David Kessler, the play resonated deeply with audiences, not just in the United States but also in Europe, particularly in Warsaw. The success of Der blinder moler led in 1927 to the play being published without the knowledge of the author in Shapiro Bookstore. Freiman's work often revolved around melodramas and musical comedies, popular genres among Yiddish-speaking audiences. His plays were known for their depth, emotional resonance, and the ability to capture the complexities of Jewish life. Some of his notable works include Ir Groyser Sud (Her Great Secret), Zayn Farshpilte Velt (His Lost World), and Dem Zaydens Gelibte (Grandpa's Sweetheart).

== Notable works ==
Freiman's career in the Yiddish theatre was marked by numerous successful plays and operettas, staged in theaters around the world. His works often featured music by notable composers.

== Legacy ==
Louis Freiman died in 1967. His work, the Louis Freiman Papers, are housed at the Center for Jewish History.
