= Michael Morris (screenwriter) =

American screenwriter

- Born: Misha Stuchkoff; January 7, 1918; Charkow, Kharkiv, Russian Empire, now Ukraine
- Died: June 20, 2003 (aged 85); Los Angeles, California, U.S.
- Occupations: TV/film screenwriter, radio performer, and actor
- Years active: 1923-1981
- Known for: wrote episodes for such TV shows as Perry Mason, The Andy Griffith Show, McHale's Navy, Sanford and Son and The Brady Bunch and Perry Mason

Michael Morris (born Misha Stuczko, later Misha Stutchkoff; January 7, 1918 – died June 20, 2003) was an American television and film screenwriter, radio performer, and actor.

== Life and career ==
Born of parents of a Polish Jewish background, Michael is the son of late writer, actor and radio show performer Nahum Stutchkoff, who wrote the "Thesaurus of the Yiddish Language" and other works. Michael was born in Kharkiv, then Russian Empire and now Ukraine.

He emigrated with his parents to the United States at the age of five, in 1923. He began his career acting with his father Nahum as a child and appearing on a WEVD radio show in New York City and in several Yiddish-speaking films. During World War II, he served in the United States Army, and then went back to New York City to write on the radio programs, Mr. And Mrs. North and The Hollywood Story. In 1960, Morris moved to Los Angeles, California, to continue his work in film and television, which he began in 1953, retiring in 1980.

Morris, who lived over the long course of his career in Hollywood, which spanned a period of three decades, from the early 1950s to the early 1980s, wrote episodes for such popular TV series as The Andy Griffith Show, Bewitched, McHale's Navy, F Troop, Sanford and Son, The Brady Bunch and All In The Family.

His film writing credits included the Made-for-television films We'll Take Manhattan (1967) and Second Chance (1972) and the films Wild and Wonderful (1964) and For Love of Money (1963).

Morris died in Los Angeles, California.
