= Abraham Ellstein =

American composer and bandleader

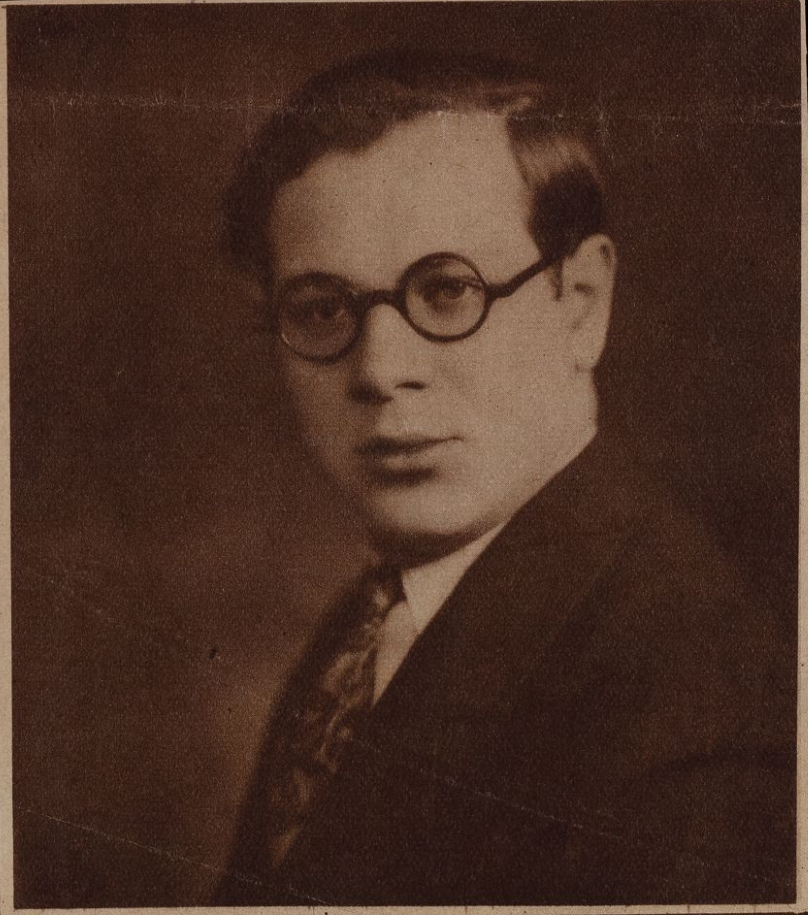
Abraham "Abe" Elstein, date unknown

Abraham "Abe" Ellstein (Yiddish: אַבֿרהם עלשטײן, Avrom Elshtayn, July 7, 1907 – March 22, 1963) was an American composer, bandleader and recording artist in the Yiddish theatre and Yiddish popular music milieu. Along with Sholom Secunda, Joseph Rumshinsky, and Alexander Olshanetsky, Ellstein was one of the "big four" composers of his era in New York City's Yiddish Theater District scene. His musical Yidl Mitn Fidl became one of the greatest hits of Yiddish-language cinema.

== Life and career ==
He was born on the Lower East Side, Manhattan, at that time an Eastern European Jewish immigrant area. His musical education began at the Third Street Music School Settlement. From the age of nine to thirteen, he studied piano with Frederick Jacobi. He was the conductor of the boy's choir of the Broadway production Richard III, at only thirteen years old. He went on to study at the Graduate School of Juilliard, training as a conductor, with a major in composition.

Ellstein's only opera, The Golem, had its world premiere at the New York City Opera under the baton of music director Julius Rudel on March 23, 1962. The libretto was created by the composer and his wife, Sylvia Regan, based on the mythical Golem tale of the Central European Jews.

== Works ==
- Der berditshever khosn (The Bridegroom from Berditchev: by Israel Rosenberg, 1930, operetta)
  - Zog Es Mir Nokh Amol (Tell Me Again); lyrics: Jacob Jacobs
- Eyns un a rekhts (One in a Million: by Anschel Schorr, 1934: musical comedy)
  - Oygn (Eyes); lyrics: Molly Picon
- Yidl Mitn Fidl (Joseph Green or Josef Grünberg, 1936, romantic musical comedy film)
  - Oy Mame, Bin Ikh Farlibt (Oh, Mama, I am in Love)
- Mamele: Kid Mother (by Edmund Zayenda, 1938, Poland: Yiddish film)
  - Abi Gezunt (So Long As You're Healthy); lyrics: Molly Picon
  - Ikh Zing (For You I Sing); lyrics: Molly Picon
  - Mazl (Good Fortune); lyrics: Molly Picon
- Bublitshki (Little Bagels: 1938, operetta)
  - Der Alter Tsigayner (The Old Gypsy); lyrics: Jacob Jacobs
- Der Nayer Sher (The New Sher, 1940)
- Ikh bin farlibt (I'm in Love: by William Siegel, 1946: romantic musical comedy)
  - Ikh Vil Es Hern Nokh Amol (I Want to Hear it Again); lyrics: Molly Picon
- A Heymisher Bulgar (1947)
- Great to Be Alive! (1950), musical comedy on Broadway
- Vos Iz Gevorn Fun Mayn Shtetele? (Whatever Became of My Shtetl?: by Menashe Skulnik, 1970s, operetta); lyrics: Isidore Lillian
- "Hassidic Dance"

== See also ==
- Molly Picon
- Seymour Rechtzeit

== Notes and references ==
- "Ellstein, Abe". Freedman Catalog, University of Pennsylvania.
- Jiddische Filmklassiker: Jiddl mitn Fidl on Abaton-Kino
- Abe Ellstein at IMDb
