= Joseph Rumshinsky =

Jewish composer (1881–1956)

Joseph Rumshinsky (1881–1956) was a Jewish composer born near Vilna, Lithuania (then part of Russian Poland). Along with Sholom Secunda, Alexander Olshanetsky and Abraham Ellstein, he is considered one of the "big four" composers and conductors of American Yiddish theater.

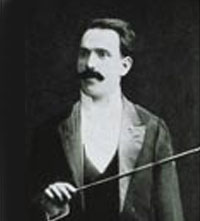
Yiddish theater composer Joseph Rumshinsky

== Biography ==
Joseph Rumshinsky's mother taught singing to local singers and badkhonim (wedding entertainers). As a child, he studied with a cantor. At the age of eight he was called "Yoshke der notn-freser" at the music school where he studied piano. He traveled until 1894 with various Hazzanim. In Grodno he first saw Yiddish theater (Abraham Goldfaden's operetta Shulamis); and joined the chorus of Kaminska's traveling troupe until 1896, when his voice changed. He then became choir director for a cantor named Rabinovitch.

He married the actress Sabrina Laxer. Their son Maury was a pianist and composer as well.

== Music career ==
His first composition was a piano waltz which became very popular in Vilna.

In 1897 he became choir director for Borisov's Russian opera/operetta; in 1888 he conducted a full production of Goldfaden's Bar Kokhba. In 1899, in Łódź, he was hired as conductor of the new Hazomir Choral Society, studying and arranging folksongs as well as Haydn, Handel, and Mendelsohn oratorios. He studied with the Polish musician Henryk Meltzer and at the Warsaw Conservatory. In 1903 he left for London to avoid conscription in the czar's army.

In London he met the New Yorker Charles Zunser, the son of the folk bard Eliakum Zunser), who convinced him to emigrate to the United States in 1904. Blocked by the union from working in the theater, he taught piano and wrote compositions including a funeral march commemorating the Kishinev pogrom. 1905-1906 he was director at Boston's Hope Theater. He then returned to New York, where he was still unable to work in theater. He was finally hired, in 1907, as director at Brooklyn's Lyric Theater, and a year later was taken on as conductor and composer at the Windsor Theater thanks to dramatic actor Jacob Adler.

Sholem Perlmutter wrote:

When Rumshinsky arrived in America the musical world looked at him as a stranger. The musicians "club," which at that time ruled over the yiddish theater with iron might, treated him like an unwanted guest and barred his way. The only one to take him seriously was Jacob P. Adler, who instinctively felt Rumshinsky had originality within him ... it was thanks to Adler that Rumshinsky got the chance to show his musical art and ability.

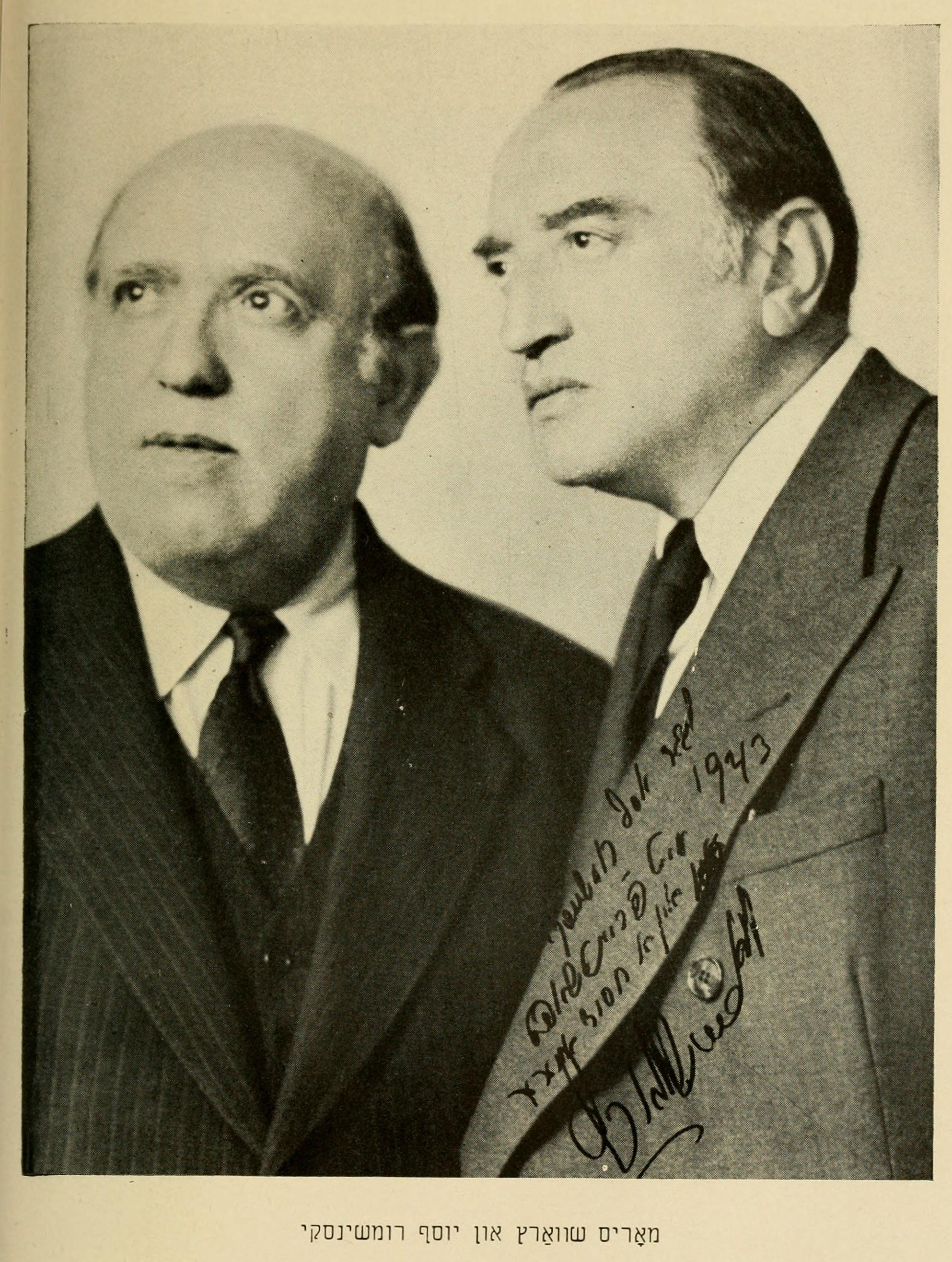
Maurice Schwartz and Joseph Rumshinsky

In 1912 Boaz Young (husband of famous actress Clara Young) wrote that when Rumshinsky/Shor's Di Amerikanerin - Dos Meydl fun der vest (The American girl - the maiden from the west) played in Warsaw, "Rumshinsky's music was so successful that not only Jews but also Poles sang it. It was sung in all the cabarets."

In New York he worked as a composer and director at Malvina Lobel's Royal Theater, from 1913 to 1914, and at Joseph Edelstein's Peoples Theater, from 1914 to 1916. At the time, many American Yiddish productions were deemed shund (trash) "that encompassed a world of cheap pulp fiction, common periodicals, and other coarse diversions." Rumshinsky tried to steer Yiddish musical entertainment away from what he called "elevated vaudeville" toward his own vision of a new American genre of Yiddish light operetta. In 1916 he joined with Boris Thomashefsky and worked as composer and conductor at the National Theater, scoring comedies and melodramas. His Tsubrokhene fidele ('Broken fiddle' or 'Broken violin') boasted a full-sized dance corps and a full pit orchestra with two dozen musicians (most productions had previously used a small dance band or wedding band). (When he first added harp, oboe, and bassoon to his orchestrations, actors called him "crazy Wagner.")

In 1919 he moved to the Kessler Second Avenue Theater in the Yiddish Theater District. In 1923 Rumshinsky introduced Molly Picon to Second Avenue in a production of Yankele. Molly Picon, her husband Jacob (Yankl) Kalich, and Rumshinsky were called "the Three Musketeers of the East Side" in a 1931 New York Times article.

Rumshinsky wrote dozens of shows over the course of four decades. Beginning in the 1930s, he also worked in radio, becoming music director of the only Yiddish program broadcast on a nationwide network, The Jewish Hour, sponsored by the Yiddish daily newspaper Der Tog. He worked from 1946 to 1949 at Maurice Schwartz's Yiddish Art Theater, scoring Hershele ostropoler, Isaac Leib Peretz's Dray matones, and Sholem Aleichem's Blondzhende shtern.

In 1940 he collected his writings, published in The Forward, adding new articles and memoirs, and published them in Tog as Epizodn fun mayn lebn (Episodes from My life). The collection was published in book form in 1944 under the title Klangen fun mayn lebn.

Rumshinsky also composed liturgical pieces. In 1926 he conducted the more than 100-voice chorus of the Hazzanim Farband Choir in his biblically-based cantata, Oz yashir. In the 1940s Rumshinsky completed an opera in Hebrew, Ruth, which has not been performed or recorded to this day. His final show, Wedding March, was in the midst of its run at the time of his death.

== Works ==
- Tsubrokhene fidl ('Broken fiddle' or 'Broken violin') (1918)
- Oy, Is Dus a Leben! (Oh, What a Life!) 1942
- Die Goldene Kale (The Golden Bride) 1923
