= Clara Young (Yiddish theater) =

Yiddish theatrical actor (c. 1882–1952)

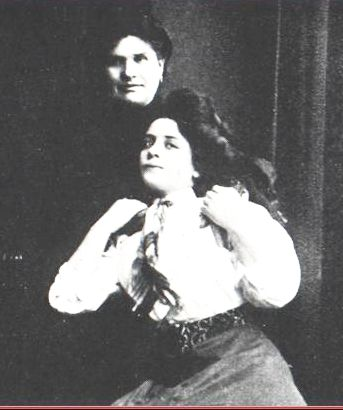
Clara Young and her mother

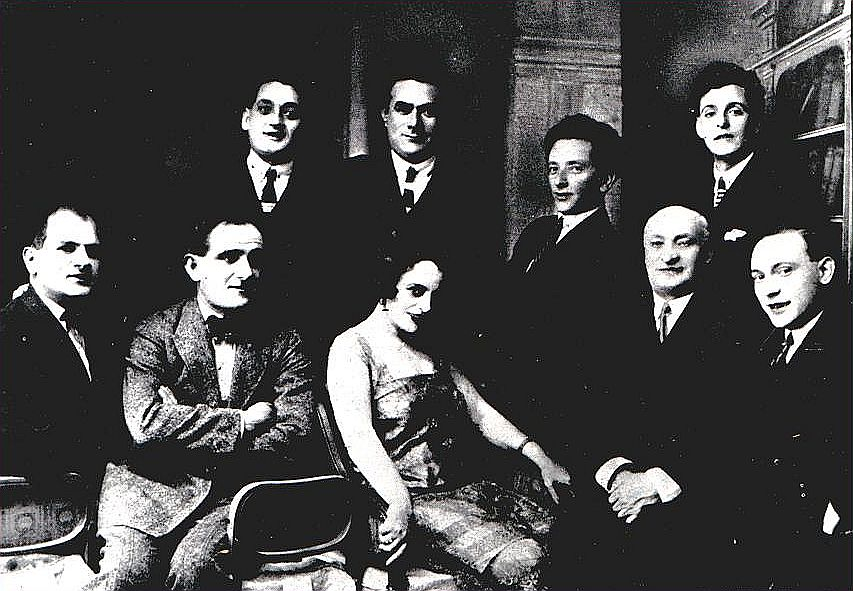
Top row: Lachman, Wolkenstain, Winkler, Bankoff; bottom row: A. Chelif, A. Oberberg, Clara Young, Boaz Youngwitz, Ilia Trilling

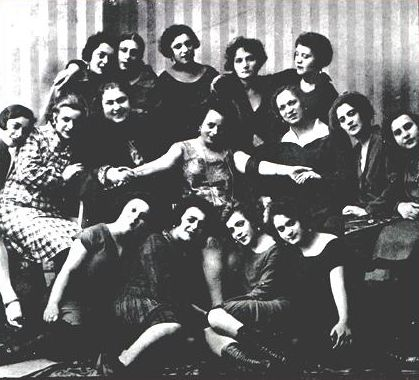
Clara Young and members of her theater troupe in Russia

Clara Young (born as Khaya-Risye Shpikolitser, c. 1882 in Zlotshev, Galicia – 1952 in Moscow) was a Yiddish theatrical actor. Born to parents who loved the stage, she spent her early years in a home that housed rehearsals of traveling Yiddish theater troupes. After her father's death, the family went to the USA, where she soon joined the Tantsman company and went to Boston, there to Zolotarevski's troupe in Montreal, thence to Toronto and to Morris Finkel's theater in Philadelphia.

In 1903, she played in the People's Music Hall, where she made a name with songs like Di dame fun Broadvey and Libe mayne. In 1909, she went over to the Thalia Theater where her husband Boaz Young was part owner. Here, she played serious roles for the first time, Tsipeniu and Got, mentsh un tayvl (God, man and devil) and Kreutzer Sonata and in Dos yidishe harts singing the couplet Sigmund Mogulesko wrote for her, Ikh hob es punkt vi in der heym. She played in Di bigamistin (zayn vayb's man) which, along with Avrom Shomer's Alrightnikes, she and her husband took to London in 1911 and then to the Lodz Groys teater and Warsaw's Elyseum Theater. Her success encouraged the couple to return to Warsaw, where in 1912 she starred in Anshel Schorr and Joseph Rumshinsky's Dos meydl fun der vest (Di Amerikanerin) and later Khantshe in Amerike and Alma, vu voynstu? (Alma, where do you live?) and the German operetta Puptshik.

According to scholar Nina Warnke, Young became "the most beloved Yiddish actress in Poland and Russia during the 1910s" – popular not only among Yiddish-speaking operetta audiences but also among non-Jewish Poles and Russians. Yiddish intellectuals and literati in Warsaw, including critics A. Mukdoyni (pseudonym of Alexander Kappel), Noach Prilutski, Dovid Frishman, and I. L. Peretz, held her acting in high esteem, despite their general ambivalence about the influx of American plays and actors into Europe at that time. Although not all of the plays in her repertoire were set in the United States, she cultivated a profile of an American playing American characters. Young's husband Boas, in his memoir Mayn Lebn (1950), recalled the broad appeal of the musical Di amerikanerin among Warsaw's diverse Jewish population:

Masses of Poles came to see Di amerikanerin; Warsaw assimilators were not embarrassed to come to the Yiddish theater ... young Hasidim would sneak into the theater ... [and] Jewish literati saw in Clara Young's performances a revival of the Yiddish language.

He noted that the play's music (composed by Rumshinsky) "could be heard in all cabarets", where it was sung by Jews and non-Jews alike.

Young's popularity grew when she starred in her husband's Jeykele the bluffer. In 1922 she starred in the premiere of Boris Thomashefsky's Di grine kuzine. In 1923, at the Prospect Theater, she played the main role in Der yeshiva bokher (The Yeshiva Student), soon after traveling in Poland and the Soviet Union for several years, then Argentina and Brazil in 1928, then back to Lodz, Warsaw, Riga and Vilna in the 1930s, then Paris, Berlin, and London, Belgium, Mexico and Cuba.

Subsequently, Clara Young returned alone to the Soviet Union, became a Soviet citizen, and spent the rest of her life there. In 1941, Young was among friends that the Polish-born actress Ida Kamińska met up with in Tashkent when they were all temporarily stuck there under wartime conditions. Young died in Moscow in 1952.

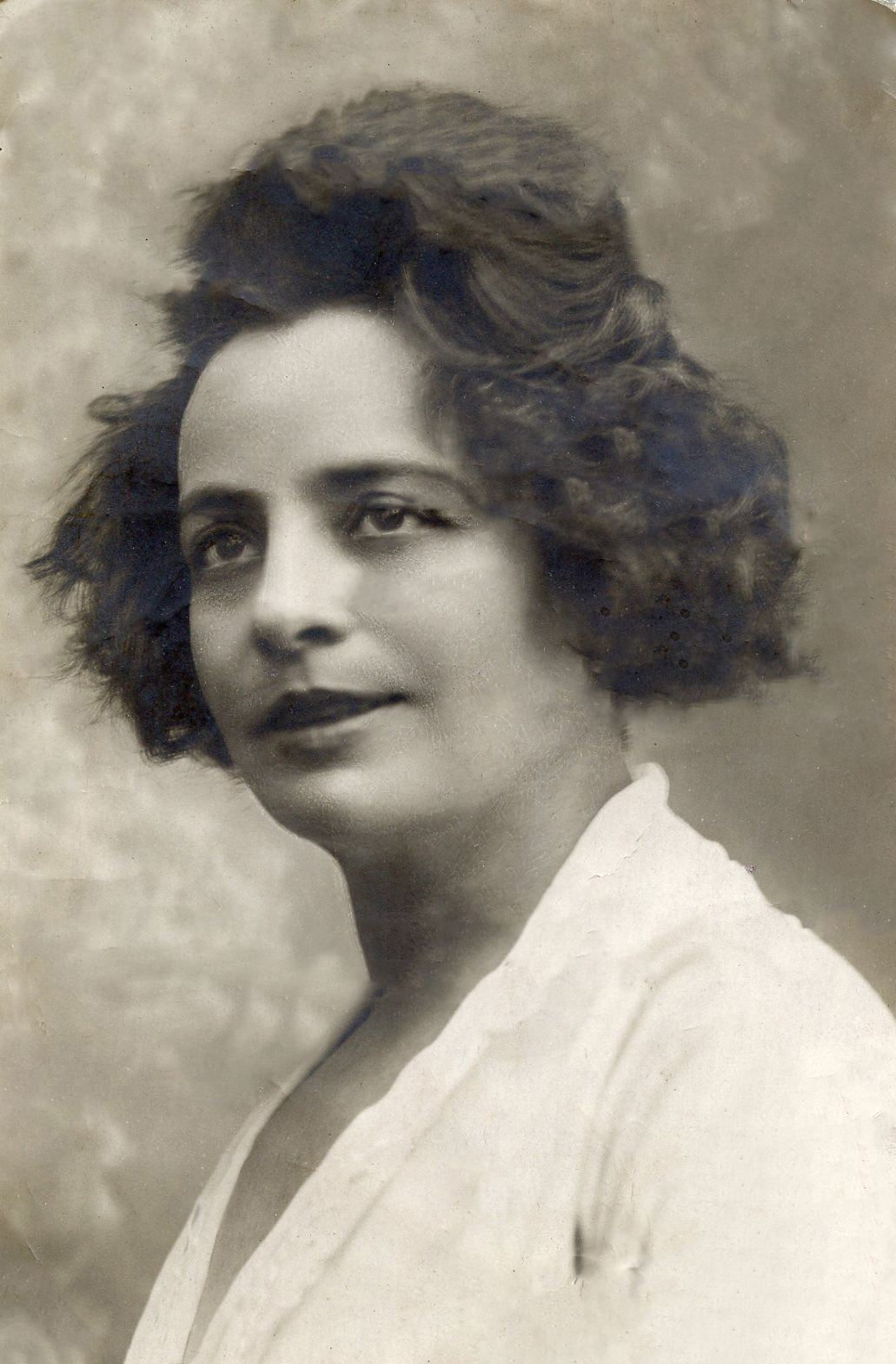
Clara Young, Russian actress
