= Parkway Theatre =

Theater in Brooklyn, New York

- U.S. National Register of Historic Places
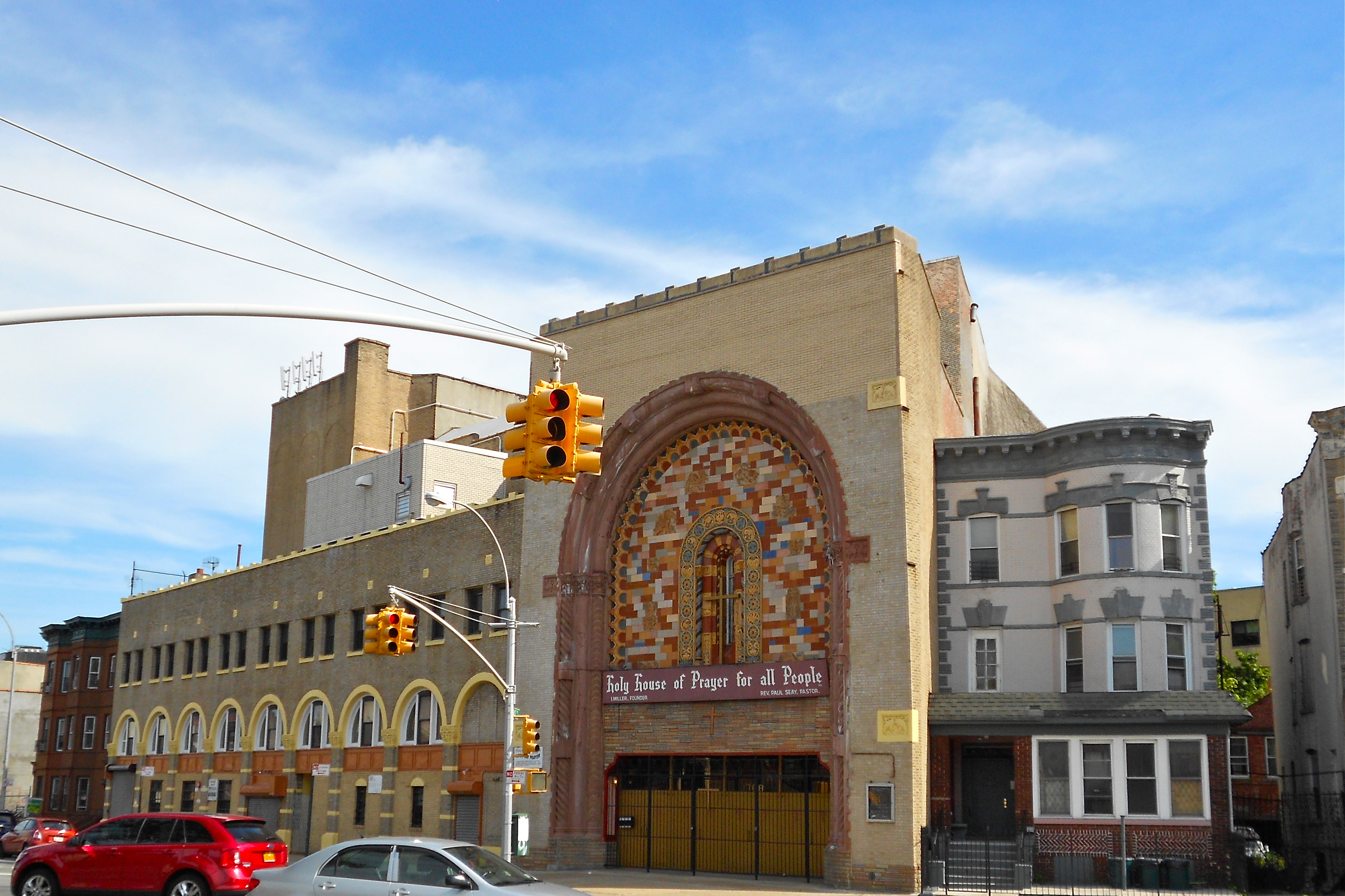
- In 2013

- Location within New York City Location within New York Location within the United States
- Location: 1768 St. Johns Place, Brooklyn, New York
- Coordinates: 40°40′11″N 73°55′7″W
- Area: less than one acre
- Built: 1928
- Architect: Wiseman, Harrison G.
- Architectural style: Moorish
- NRHP reference No.: 10000136
- Added to NRHP: March 31, 2010

The Parkway Theatre, also known as the Rolland Theatre and since 1956 as the Holy House of Prayer for All People, is a historic former theater at 1768 St. Johns Place, at the intersection with Eastern Parkway in Brownsville, Brooklyn, New York City. It was built in 1928 and is a steel-frame-and-concrete building faced in buff-colored brick with terra cotta trim. It consists of a long and low three-story block along St. Johns Place, with a triangular lobby block fronting a tall, rectangular-plan auditorium block and stage fly loft block.

It was listed on the National Register of Historic Places in 2010.
