= Jacob Jacobs (theater) =

American theatre director

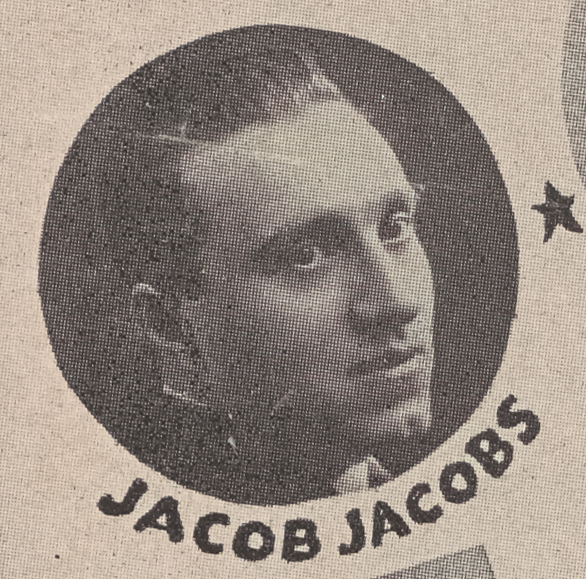
- Head shot of Jacob Jacobs from a 1961 theater program
- Born: Yakov Yakubovitsh; January 1, 1890; Râșca, Romania
- Died: October 14, 1977 (aged 87); New York City, U.S.
- Resting place: Mount Hebron Cemetery (New York City)
- Known for: Song lyrics: Bei Mir Bistu Shein

Jacob Jacobs (born Yakov Yakubovitsh) (January 2, 1890 – October 14, 1977), was a Yiddish theater and vaudeville director, producer, lyricist, songwriter, coupletist, character actor, comic born in Rosca, Hungary (now Râșca, Romania). In 1904 the family emigrated to the United States and Jacobs worked in a soda factory, later in a sheet-metal factory, and then learned tailoring.

In 1907, he joined the chorus in a vaudeville theater and he sang couplets on Sundays, when vaudeville plays could not be presented. The following year he was hired as a vaudeville actor. In 1911, he was in his first play, Leon Kobrin's Yankel Boyla at the Odeon theater. In 1912 he became director of the Lyric Theater in Brownsville, Brooklyn, and then a partner with Nathan Goldberg in the Lennox Theater in Harlem.

From 1926 to 1930 he was co-director of the National Theater, and subsequently the Prospect Theater in the Bronx. He wrote the music to his own couplets. He married Rebecca Treitler (Betty), daughter of the Yiddish theater director.

In 1932, he collaborated with composer Sholom Secunda on a Yiddish musical comedy, I Would If I Could. Although the show was not a great success, it did produce a song that become a #1 hit, "Bei Mir Bistu Shein."

He wrote, composed, and directed the Broadway show The President's Daughter in 1970.

He is buried in Mount Hebron Cemetery, in the Yiddish Theatrical Alliance area.
