= Mirele Efros =

1898 Yiddish play by Jacob Gordin

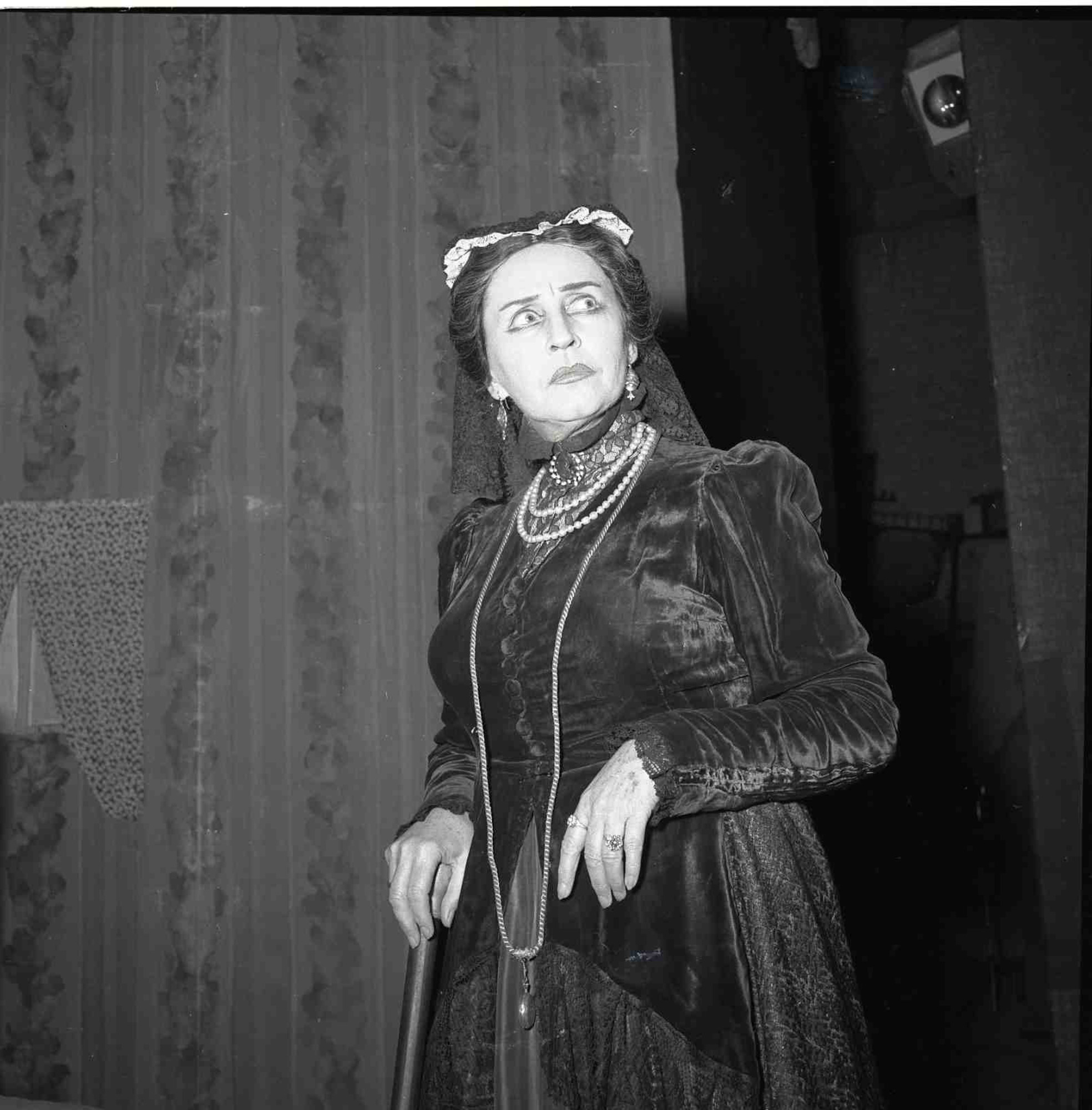
Hanna Rovina, in her role as Mirele Efros, costume by Isaac Frenkel

Mirele Efros (Yiddish: מירעלע אפֿרת; also anglicised as Mireleh Efros) was an 1898 Yiddish play by Jacob Gordin. Some have called it "the Jewish Queen Lear".

The title character is a powerful matriarch who becomes bitterly estranged from her own family. Lulla Rosenfeld, in her commentary to Jacob Adler's memoir, describes the central character as part of a tradition running at least from Solomon Ettinger's Serkele (1825) to Clifford Odets' Awake and Sing (1935).

The title role was, according to Rosenfeld, "performed by every leading Yiddish actress". It was originally played by Keni Liptzin, during the first heyday of Yiddish theater in New York City. It was also notably played by Polish actress Esther Rachel Kaminska, who performed the part in New York in 1912. The Liptzin production had David Kessler as Mirele's son and Dinah Feinman (the former wife of Jacob Adler) as her daughter-in-law Shaindl.

A silent Yiddish film based on the play was produced in Warsaw, in 1912, directed by Andrzej Marek (Mark Arnstein) and starring Esther Rachel Kaminska, along with her daughter Ida Kaminska. A film adaptation of the play was made in the United States in 1939. It was directed by Josef Berne with Berta Gersten in the title role and Ruth Elbaum as Shaindl. It was made in Yiddish with English subtitles.

== Plot ==
The title character, Mirele, is a fifty-year-old widow when the play begins who, over the last several decades, salvaged her late husband's failing business. Honest, hardworking, and astute, but also autocratic, her authority is challenged by her daughter-in-law Shaindl, who insists that it is time that her husband, Mirele's son, inherit the business. The inheritance is given—the house as well—but grudgingly, in such a manner as to cut off Mirele from her family. She takes refuge with her faithful steward, Kalman, towards whom she continues to behave as an autocrat.

Ten years later Shaindl, her marriage and the business both going poorly, attempts to heal the breach in time for her son's bar mitzvah. Mirele refuses, but after Shaindl's departure she collapses in grief. Ultimately, the boy successfully approaches her on the day of his bar mitzvah and convinces her to come. Despite its tragic, Shakespearean tone, the play, atypically for Gordin, ends happily, with song and dance.

== Readings ==
- Adler, Jacob, A Life on the Stage: A Memoir, translated and with commentary by Lulla Rosenfeld, Knopf, New York, 1999, ISBN 0-679-41351-0. 259-261 (commentary)
