= Allen Adler =

American writer (1916–1964)

- Born: December 25, 1916 New York City, New York, U.S.
- Died: January 30, 1964 (aged 47) New York City, New York, U.S.
- Occupation: Writer
- Language: English
- Genre: Science fiction
- Relatives: Jacob Pavlovich Adler (grandfather); Sonya Adler (grandmother); Celia Adler (aunt); Jay Adler (uncle); Julia Adler (aunt); Stella Adler (aunt); Luther Adler (uncle)

Allen Adler (December 25, 1916 – January 30, 1964) was an American author who was also involved with theater. With Irving Block he wrote the story for the screenplay for the movie Forbidden Planet, based on Shakespeare's The Tempest, but during the Second Red Scare of the 1950s he was blacklisted from the movie industry.

== Biography ==
Adler was the son of Abe Adler (a stage manager) who was the son of Yiddish theater actor Jacob Adler by his first wife Sonya ("Sophia") Adler. Per the biography on the back jacket of Adler's novel Mach 1, "He majored in English at New York University, wrote publicity for Robert Ripley of 'Believe It Or Not,', owned a New York theatre at twenty-one, presented touring opera companies, served in the air force in World War II in the Fifth Air Force, Far Eastern Air Force and Thirteenth Bomber Command. He produced a revival of Front Page, has written both original stories and screenplays for the motion pictures."

In addition to Forbidden Planet, Adler has a story credit for the movie The Giant Behemoth (1959).

The New York Times of February 1, 1964, includes Adler's obituary, giving the date of his death as January 30, 1964. It says he was born in New York, the son of Adolf Adler, Yiddish theater manager and owner. He was survived by his widow, the former Mary MacNamara, and two daughters, Pamela and Allison Jo.

== Works ==
- Mach 1: A Story of Planet Ionus (1957)

== Notes ==
- — Writers Guild Announces 21 Credit Corrections For Films Written by Blacklisted Writers
- Adler, Jacob, A Life on the Stage: A Memoir, translated and with commentary by Lulla Rosenfeld, Knopf, New York, 1999, ISBN 0-679-41351-0, 386 (commentary).
- Tuck, Donald H. (1974). The Encyclopedia of Science Fiction and Fantasy. Chicago: Advent. p. 240.
- Vaughan, Virginia Mason; Vaughan, Alden T. (1999). The Tempest. The Arden Shakespeare, Third Series. The Arden Shakespeare. ISBN 978-1-903436-08-0.
