= Celia Adler =

American actress (1889–1979)

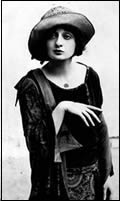
- Adler, c. 1918
- Born: Tzirele Adler; December 6, 1889; New York City, U.S.
- Died: January 31, 1979 (aged 89); New York City, U.S.
- Resting place: Mount Hebron Cemetery
- Occupation: Actress
- Years active: 1937–1961
- Spouses: Lazar Freed (m. 1914; div. 1919) Jack Cone (m. 1930; died 1959) Nathan Forman (m. 1959; died 1979)
- Parents: Jacob Pavlovich Adler; Dinah Shtettin
- Relatives: Jay Adler (half-brother); Julia Adler (half-sister); Stella Adler (half-sister); Luther Adler (half-brother); Allen Adler (nephew)

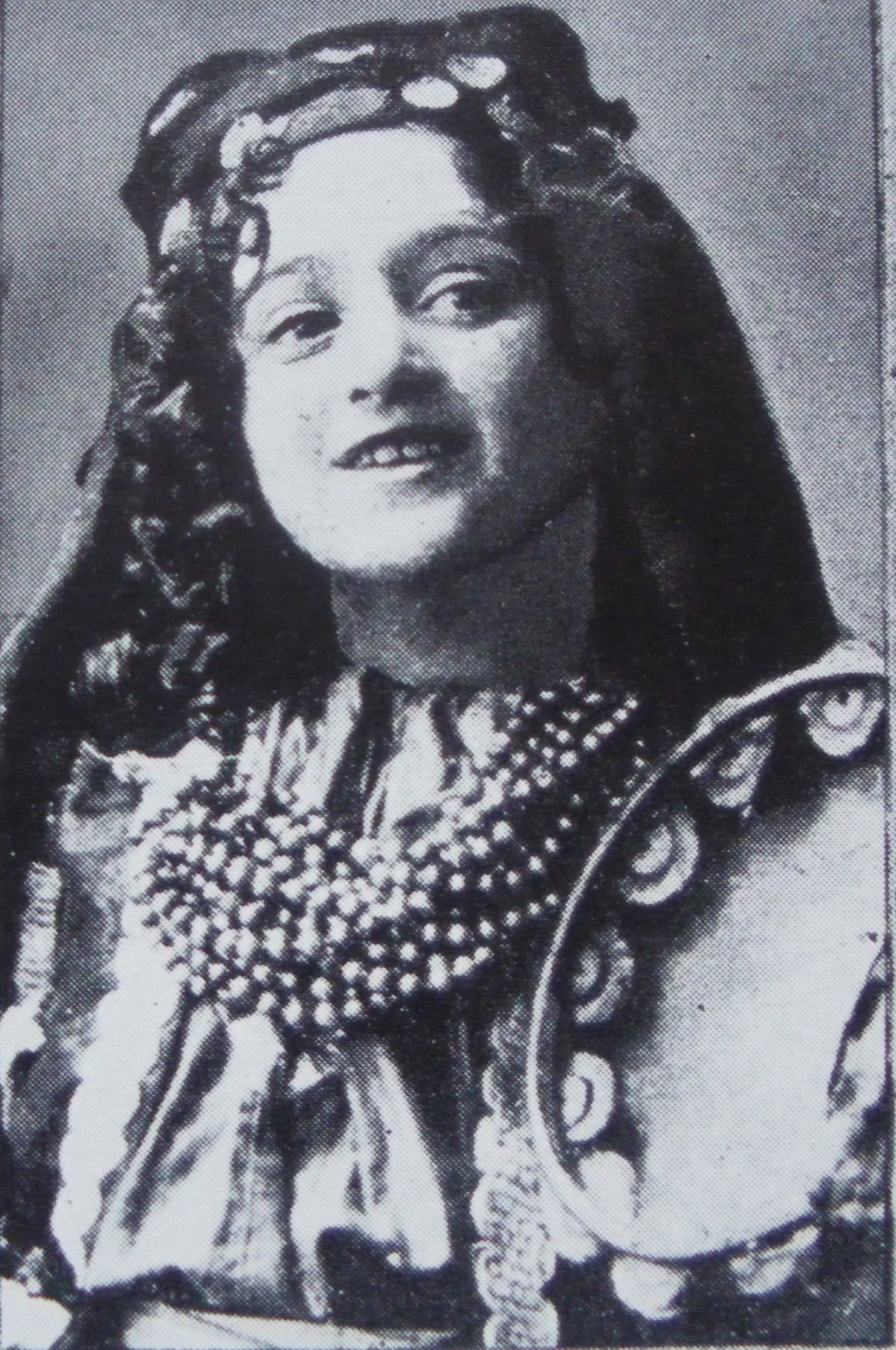
Celia Adler as a child

Celia Feinman Adler (December 6, 1889 – January 31, 1979) was an American actress, known as the "First Lady of the Yiddish Theatre".

== Early life ==
Tzirele Adler was born in New York City on December 6, 1889, to daughter of Jacob Adler and Dinah Shtettin, who were both actors in the Yiddish theater. From a young age, she was referred to as Celia. She was the half-sister of Stella Adler, Luther Adler, and Jacob Adler's five other children. Unlike Stella and Luther, who became well known for their work with the Group Theater and their film work and as theorists of the craft of acting, she was almost exclusively a stage actress.

Celia's mother, Dinah Shtettin, was the second wife of Jacob Adler, whose first wife had died. The couple had met and married in London, and they arrived in the United States from there shortly before Celia's birth. They divorced when Celia was a young child when Adler eloped with Sara Heine, although they continued to work together in the theater.

Shtettin subsequently married the actor and playwright Sigmund Feinman, and Celia was raised by her mother and stepfather. Needing work, Shtettin continued to work with Adler's troupe and brought Celia onstage as a prop at as young as six months old. When Celia was four, she acted in The Yiddish King Lear alongside her father and step-mother, in a role playwright Jacob Gordin had written specifically for her.

Celia used her stepfather's last name when she was growing up but later changed her name to "Adler" for her stage career.

== Career ==
After playing many child roles in the Yiddish theater, Adler distanced herself from the theater for a time during her teenage years, but then resumed her acting career in 1909 as Celia Feinman with the encouragement of the actress Bertha Kalisch, with whom she co-starred in a production of Hermann Sudermann's play Heimat. Adler acted alongside her mother in the London Pavilion Theatre, and they toured together in 1910. When she was hired by Boris Thomashefsky as an understudy for the New York People’s Theater, and she signed on as Celia Adler. Her first several years of acting were difficult, as she moved between temporary contracts in the male-dominated field.

Adler's first major dramatic success was in Ossip Dymou's “The Eternal Wanderer,” at Boris Thomashefsky's National Theater in New York in 1913. In 1918, she was hired by the Yiddish Art Theater, which put on as many as thirty-five plays per season and relied on actors ad-libbing their lines. Adler was typically cast as a weeping maiden or desperate mother. Adler and Jacob Ben-Ami convinced director Maurice Schwartz to stage a serious drama, which was an instant hit, but did not ultimately change Schwartz's directing style. Because of this, in 1919, Ben-Ami separated into the Jewish Art Theater, which Adler joined. This theater Jewish playwrights and Yiddish translations of English, Russian, and German plays at the Irving Palace Theater. The next year, she, along with and others, left to create the Jewish Art Theater. However, this theater was short-lived due to a conflict with the financial backer.

In 1921-22, Adler was the leading lady in Schwartz's troupe. the next year, she was a guest star in Philadelphia with Anshel Schorr and touring Europe and America with Ludwig Satz. In 1927-28, she directed her own repertory company. The next year, she re-encountered her childhood acquaintance theater manager and actor Jack Cone, who suggested he marry her so he could join her on her journey to perform in Buenos Aires and appease her fear of traveling alone.

During her career, Adler created leading roles in Yiddish versions of many classic plays, including the work of Hauptmann, Sudermann, Ibsen, Shaw and Shakespeare. As Yiddish-language theater became less popular with the dispersal of the Jewish community and decrease in Yiddish-speakers, Adler made her loyalty to the genre clear; when she acted in an English version of David Pinski's The Treasure, she wrote a letter in the Yiddish World assuring her fans that this was temporary.

After World War II, Adler was contracted by the Jewish Welfare Board to entertain troops in American military camps with an English and Yiddish program that she later brought off-Broadway. In 1946, Adler gave one of the first theatrical portrayals of a Holocaust survivor in Luther Adler's Broadway production A Flag Is Born (written by Ben Hecht and featuring a 22-year-old Marlon Brando, Stella Adler's prize pupil in method acting). Adler, along with co-stars Paul Muni and Marlon Brando, refused to accept compensation above the Actor's Equity minimum wage because of her commitment to the cause of creating a Jewish State in Israel. While this play was expected to run for a month, it lasted thirty weeks.

Adler's last appearance on stage was in 1961 in A Worm in Horseradish. She continued to perform occasionally at recitals, benefits, and lectures until her death.

=== Film ===
In 1937, Celia Adler starred in the Henry Lynn Yiddish film, Where Is My Child. From 1937-1952, she appeared in several films and television programs. Her last film was a 1985 British documentary with archive footage, Almonds and Raisins, narrated by, among others, Orson Welles, Herschel Bernardi and Seymour Rechzeit.

== Personal life ==
She was married three times, to actor Lazar Freed, theatrical manager Jack Cone, and businessman Nathan Forman. She and Freed married in 1914; they had one child, Selwyn (Zelig) Freed and divorced in 1919. In 1930 Adler married Cone, who was her manager at the time; he died in 1959. Later that same year she married Forman, who died just one month before Adler, in 1979.

== Death ==
Adler is buried in the Yiddish Theatre Section of Mount Hebron Cemetery in New York City having died from a stroke.
