= Keni Liptzin =

American actress (1856–1918)

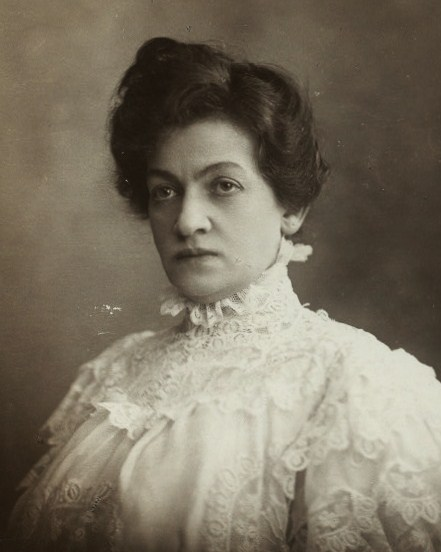
- Born: 1856; Zhitomir, Volhynian Governorate, Russian Empire
- Died: September 28, 1918 (aged 61–62); New York City, U.S.
- Other names: Keni Sonyes
- Occupation: Yiddish theater actor

Keni Liptzin (also spelled Lipzin; 1856 – September 28, 1918) was a star in the early years of Yiddish theater, probably the greatest female dramatic star of the first great era of Yiddish theater in New York City.

== Life ==
Born in Zhitomir in the Volhynian Governorate of the Russian Empire (present-day Ukraine), Liptzin had no formal education. She ran away from an arranged marriage, running to Smila, where she was first discovered (originally for her singing voice) and put on stage by Israel Rosenberg in 1880. She originally used the stage name Keni Sonyes, but after marrying theatrical prompter Volodya Liptzin in London in the mid-1880s, she took his last name.

After Sonya Adler's death in London in 1886, she played dramatic roles opposite Jacob Adler and joined Adler when he came to America, playing with him in Chicago, before travelling to New York City in 1889, where she played first in the company of Moishe Finkel and David Kessler, then renting her own theater. She was most famous for playing the lead roles in two Jacob Gordin plays, Di shkhite and Mirele Efros, the former an attack on arranged marriage, the latter a story about an embittered matriarch who is finally reconciled again to her family. Abraham Cahan, an editor of the Jewish Daily Forward, said of her performance in Mirele Efros, "Liptzin's pride, her humor, her shrewdness, come not from Lithuania, but from Shakespeare," describing her as "...a Lear... a queen..."

In her own theater, she also put on works by Victor Hugo, Alphonse Daudet, Gerhart Hauptmann, and Leonid Andreyev.

She died on September 28, 1918.

== Sources ==
- Adler, Jacob, A Life on the Stage: A Memoir, translated and with commentary by Lulla Rosenfeld, Knopf, New York, 1999, ISBN 0-679-41351-0, 157, 258, 258-261 (commentary), 361 (commentary), 371 (commentary), 380 (commentary).
