= Jay Adler =

American actor (1896–1978)

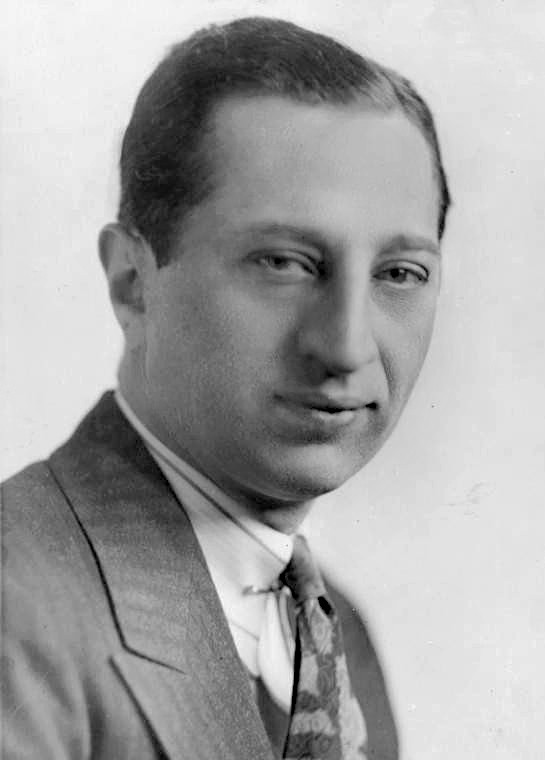
- Adler, c. 1935
- Born: August 4, 1896; New York City, U.S.
- Died: September 24, 1978 (aged 82); Los Angeles, California, U.S.
- Occupation: Actor
- Years active: 1933–1976
- Parents: Jacob Pavlovich Adler; Sara Adler
- Relatives: Celia Adler (half-sister); Julia Adler (sister); Stella Adler (sister); Luther Adler (brother); Allen Adler (nephew)

Jay Adler (August 4, 1896 – September 24, 1978) was an American actor in theater, television, and film.

== Early life ==
Jay Adler was born in New York City, the eldest son of actors Jacob and Sara Adler. He had five actor siblings, including stage actor Luther and drama coach Stella. The Adlers were a Jewish-American acting dynasty in New York City's Yiddish Theater District and they played a significant role in theater from the late 19th century to the 1950s. Stella Adler became the most influential member of their family.

== Career ==
Adler's Broadway credits included Cafe Crown (1942), Blind Alley (1940, 1935), Prelude (1936), and Man Bites Dog (1933).

In 1934, Adler joined with Harry Thomashefsky and Boris Bernardi to form the Theater Mart Group, "a cooperative group of players and staff connected with the stage", in New York City. Plans called for production of plays like those done by the city's Group Theatre.

During a long acting career of minor character roles, Jay Adler appeared in more than 40 films and 37 television series between 1938 and 1976, accumulating more than 130 total performing credits.

He appeared in The Big Combo (1955), Stanley Kubrick's The Killing (1956) and Jerry Lewis' The Family Jewels (1965).

In 1961, Adler appeared both in the episode "The Lady and the Lawyer" of the television series The Asphalt Jungle and in The Lawbreakers, a theatrical film version of the episode. In 1962, he appeared in the episode "To Climb Steep Hills" of the adventure drama television series Straightaway.

== Death ==
Jay Adler died at age 81 in Woodland Hills, California and was buried in the Mount Carmel Cemetery in Glendale, Queens, New York City, near to his parents.

== Partial filmography ==
- No Time to Marry (1938) - Hess
- Penrod and His Twin Brother (1938) - Johnson
- The Saint in New York (1938) - Eddie, a Hood (uncredited)
- Murder in the Night (1939) - Drunk with Two Girls (uncredited)
- The Underworld Story (1950) - Munsey's Assistant (uncredited)
- Three Secrets (1950) - City Editor (uncredited)
- Cry Danger (1951) - Williams
- The Mob (1951) - Russell - Hotel Clerk (uncredited)
- Scandal Sheet (1952) - Bailey (uncredited)
- My Six Convicts (1952) - Steve Kopac
- Dreamboat (1952) - Desk Clerk (uncredited)
- Assignment – Paris! (1952) - Henry (uncredited)
- My Man and I (1952) - Bartender (uncredited)
- The Prisoner of Zenda (1952) - Customs Officer (uncredited)
- The Turning Point (1952) - Sammy Lester (uncredited)
- My Pal Gus (1952) - Van Every (uncredited)
- The Bad and the Beautiful (1952) - Mr. Z - Party Guest (uncredited)
- The Juggler (1953) - Papa Sander - Susy's Father (uncredited)
- Vice Squad (1953) - Frankie Pierce
- 99 River Street (1953) - Christopher
- The Long Wait (1954) - Joe—Bellhop
- Down Three Dark Streets (1954) - Uncle Max - aka Charles Martell
- The Big Combo (1955) - Detective Sam Hill
- Murder Is My Beat (1955) - Bartender Louie
- Love Me or Leave Me (1955) - Orry (uncredited)
- Illegal (1955) - Joseph Carter
- Lucy Gallant (1955) - Sam - Stationmaster (uncredited)
- Man with the Gun (1955) - Cal (uncredited)
- The Killing (1956) - Leo the Loanshark
- The Catered Affair (1956) - Sam Leiter
- Lust for Life (1956) - Waiter
- Runaway Daughters (1956) - Mr. Rubeck
- Crime of Passion (1957) - Nalence
- Sweet Smell of Success (1957) - Manny Davis (uncredited)
- Hell on Devil's Island (1957) - Toto
- The Brothers Karamazov (1958) - Pawnbroker
- Saddle the Wind (1958) - Hank - Saloon Cleanup Man (uncredited)
- Seven Guns to Mesa (1958) - Ben Avery
- Curse of the Undead (1959) - Bartender - Jake
- The Last Angry Man (1959) - Abelman's Feuding Neighbor (uncredited)
- The Story on Page One (1959) - Lauber (uncredited)
- All the Fine Young Cannibals (1960) - Sammy Trist (uncredited)
- Who's Got the Action? (1962) - Man in Car Accident (uncredited)
- Dime with a Halo (1963) - Mr. Lewis
- Who's Been Sleeping in My Bed? (1963) - Patient (uncredited)
- Where Love Has Gone (1964) - Bartender (uncredited)
- The Family Jewels (1965) - Mr. Lyman, Attorney
- The Yin and the Yang of Mr. Go (1970) - Dr. Yul
- Brother, Cry for Me (1970)
- Grave of the Vampire (1972) - Old Zack
- Bummer (1973) - Sid Rosen
- Macon County Line (1974) - Impound Yard Man
