= Abba Schoengold =

Romanian theatre performer

Abba Schoengold (also Shoengold, Shongold, or Sheingold) was a Romanian Jewish actor in the early years of Yiddish theater, the first person to score a serious reputation as a dramatic actor in Yiddish.

== Biography ==
A singer in the synagogue choir of the leading synagogue in Bucharest, Romania, Schoengold had also performed in a quartet with Sigmund Mogulesko, playing at weddings and parties. He failed an audition in 1877 for Abraham Goldfaden's nascent Yiddish theater company (which Mogulesko joined). Within a year, he had joined the troupe of playwright Moses Halevy-Hurvitz, which toured through rural Romania and eventually to Chişinău, where his performance supposedly inspired David Kessler's interest in theater. He then travelled on his own to Odessa, Ukraine.

In 1882, at the Mariinsky Theater in Odessa, he scored a triumph in the first Yiddish-language production of Karl Gutzkow's Uriel Acosta. Jacob Adler writes that at this time he was "the god of the Yiddish public, the god, indeed, of all who saw him on stage... the handsomest man in the world. Tall. Blue eyes. Golden hair. An Apollo." [Adler, 1999, 221] Adler also writes that he had "a mania for adding to his costume... a plume, a feather, a cape, a scarf, ... medals". [Adler, 1999, 269]

With his wife Clara Schoengold, he followed much of the Yiddish theater community to London in the mid-1880s and thence to New York City. Their son Joseph married Adler's daughter Frances in New York in 1911; both went on to be leading lights of the Yiddish stage.
