= Israel Rosenberg =

Yiddish theatre performer (c. 1850 – 1903/1904)

Israel (also Yisroel or Yisrol) Rosenberg (c. 1850 – 1903 or 1904; Yiddish/Hebrew: ישראל ראָזענבערג) founded the first Yiddish theater troupe in Imperial Russia.

== Life ==
Having been a "hole-and-corner lawyer" (without a diploma) and swindler in Odessa, Rosenberg was one of many merchants and middlemen who moved to Bucharest, Romania, at the start of the Russo-Turkish War in 1877. When he arrived, he joined the nascent professional Yiddish-language theater troupe of Abraham Goldfaden.

Following disagreements with Goldfaden, Rosenberg and his countryman Jacob Spivakovsky assembled a new travelling troupe and travelled around the eastern part of Romania. The troupe was initially successful, but much of their Yiddish-speaking audience returned to Russia at the end of the war, and they eventually returned destitute to Odessa, where there was a ready audience of those who had already seen Yiddish theater in Romania during the war.

In spring 1878, Rosenberg obtained some funding and formed a troupe including Spivakovsky; Broder singers "Schmul with the Hoarse Throat", "Boris Budgoy" (Boris Holtzerman), Laizer Duke, Aaron Schrage; Jacob Adler, at that time new to performing; Sophia (Sonya) Oberlander, who later married Adler; Masha Moskovich, whom Adler in his memoir describes as "a red-gold-haired beauty"; and various others, including singers from a local synagogue choir. Their first performance was at Akiva's restaurant, and consisted of two light vaudevilles and Goldfaden's very early play, The Recruits. The cast was all male, because the two women were unhappy with the venue; this issue was solved by renting the Remesleni Club, an 800-seat theater that had hosted many German-language performances, where they played Goldfaden's Grandmother and Granddaughter with another Broder singer, Weinstein, as the grandmother and Masha Moskovich as the granddaughter.

After several more productions in Odessa, including Breindele Cossack starring Jacob Adler and Sonya Oberlander (then performing under the name Sonya Michelson), their run was cut short by the news that Goldfaden, whose plays they were using without permission, was coming to Odessa with his troupe, and had booked the Remesleni Club from under them. Goldfaden later said that he was coming there at the urging of his father, while Adler attributes it to Rosenberg and Spivakovsky's "enemies". Rosenberg hired Goldfaden's watchmaker brother Naphtal, renamed his troupe "the Goldfaden Company", and left Odessa to tour the hinterland, with Sonya's brother Alexander as an advance man.

In Kherson, a granary was adapted into a theater by a wealthy retired soldier, Lipitz Beygun, who imported high-quality scenery from Spain. Here they acquired a new prompter, Avrom Zetzer—whom Adler describes as a "learned" man who had previously fulfilled the same function for Goldfaden in Romania— and virtuoso Zorach Vinyavich became leader of their orchestra. Vinyavich's 16-year-old daughter Bettye also joined the troupe to play juvenile roles.

Returning to Odessa, they found Goldfaden "as difficult to approach as an emperor". When they finally managed to get an audience, Goldfaden agreed to allow Rosenberg's company to function as a provincial touring company, but with another of his brothers, Tulya, as head of the troupe. Goldfaden also poached Spivakovsky for his own Odessa company.

With Tulya in charge there were, as Adler wrote, "no more communistic shares, no more idealistic comradeship". They played a month in Chişinău, where people slept in the courtyard to be the first to get tickets, and a 16-year-old David Kessler was almost accepted to join the company as an extra, but was prevented from doing so by his father. Later they toured to Yelizavetgrad (now Kirovohrad), where they were joined by Israel and Annetta Grodner, who had rejoined Goldfaden in Odessa before falling out with him.

When his actors went on strike in Kremenchuk over low pay, Rosenberg himself played the juvenile lead role in Shmendrik, effectively breaking the strike. The dispute was resolved, and one of their next performances, in Poltava, became a benefit as a wedding gift to Adler and Oberlander. They toured on through Ukraine, until Goldfaden called them back to Odessa, which most of the troupe obeyed, leaving Rosenberg and the Adler-Oberlander contingent in Smila without a troupe.

In Smila they overheard a woman singing who later become famous under the name Keni Liptzin, but was at this time known as Keni Sonyes, who became their new prima donna. They toured on to Spolya, which at the time belonged to Count Alexander A. Abaza, among the most philo-Semitic of Tsar Alexander II's advisors. The town lacked a theater, but at Abaza's behest a storehouse was turned into a performance space, furnished in part from the count's own dacha. The troupe continued on to Zlatapolya, Novomirgorod, and Bogoslav, around which time Alexander Oberlander left to marry and settle down, and was replaced as advance man by a former employer of Adler's named Cheikel Bain.

Though they were able to maintain a reasonable lifestyle from their touring, the troupe encountered some problems. In Pereiaslav, according to Adler, they played at a fine small theater, but the local police chief tried to treat the actresses as prostitutes. Goldfaden demanded extremely high royalties; at one point Sonya Adler gave him nearly all of her jewelry to placate him. In late 1880, Goldfaden briefly recruited the Adlers away from Rosenberg, but he treated them so badly that they ended up suing him for their wages and rejoining Rosenberg in Nezhin, where his troupe was performing in a tent theater.

The period after the February 1881 assassination of Tsar Alexander II was difficult for the Jews. Provocateurs were traveling around the empire, stirring up pogroms, one of which swept over the troupe in Nezhin. The troupe managed to avoid injury partly by convincing the rioters that they were a French theater troupe and partly with the help of the money the Adlers had won in court from Goldfaden.

The troupe continued to Łódź, where they were able to pay off some debts with their earnings. Learning that in Odessa Osip Mikhailovich Lerner and Goldfaden were each presenting their own versions of Karl Gutzkow's Uriel Acosta, Rosenberg and company decided to do the same. Rosenberg translated; with Spivakovsky having ducked out only three days before opening, Adler played the title role, Liptzin played Uriel's mother, and Sonya Adler played Judith. The production was a success, but the troupe left Łódź. Spivakovsky returned, and nearly stole the troupe out from under Rosenberg. In the end, reunited, they went on to Zhytomyr with a new director, an apparently rich man named Hartenstein who expressed an interest in investing in them.

Adler, in his memoir, indicates that he was unimpressed with Hartenstein, describing him as "a young man from Galicia with long hair and short brains, half educated in Vienna, and half an actor". They thought they had found "a quiet corner" of the Russian Empire in which "to make a bit of a livelihood", but in fact Hartenstein was simply running through his money.

In Zhytomyr, they shared a theater with a Russian troupe who were sympathetic to their situation. Two Russian actors agreed to participate in a series of benefits on their behalf; one of them, whom Adler identifies only as "Mademoiselle Kislova", nearly destroyed them by making a speech from the stage excoriating the audience and Russian society in general for their lack of support for what she considered to be good theater.

The next incarnation of the company was organized by Adler, although Rosenberg was once again a partner. With Keni Liptzin, they toured to Rostov, Taganrog, around Lithuania, and to Dünaburg (now Daugavpils, Latvia). Intending to bring the troupe to Saint Petersburg, they brought back their former manager Chaikel Bain. They were in Riga in August 1883 when the news arrived that a total ban was about to be placed on Yiddish theater in Russia.

The troupe were left stranded in Riga. Chaikel Bain took ill and died. With some difficulty, passage to London for the troupe was arranged on a cattle ship, in exchange for entertaining the crew. However, about this time the Grodners reappeared, and Adler wanted to include them in the group headed for London. According to Adler, Rosenberg, who played many of the same roles as Israel Grodner, told Adler "it's him or me". Adler attempted to convince him to change his mind, but insisted on including Grodner in the travel party; Adler considered him one of the best actors in Yiddish theater and an asset to the troupe for their performances in London, while he felt Rosenberg lacked depth as an actor. He tried to convince Rosenberg to come with them to London, but Rosenberg refused.

In his memoir, Adler says that when he went back in Europe in 1903 in the wake of the Chişinău pogrom, in an unsuccessful attempt to convince some of his family to join him in the United States, he encountered Rosenberg as a street beggar and unsuccessfully attempted to give him money. Shortly after, he heard that Rosenberg was dead.
