= Luther Adler =

American actor (1903–1984)

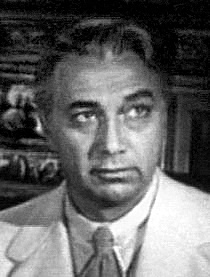
- Adler in the 1950 film D.O.A.
- Born: Lutha Adler; May 4, 1903; New York City, U.S.
- Died: December 8, 1984 (aged 81); Kutztown, Pennsylvania, U.S.
- Occupation: Actor
- Years active: 1908–1982
- Spouses: Sylvia Sidney (m. 1938; div. 1946) Julie Roche (m. 1959; died 1984)
- Children: 1
- Parents: Jacob Pavlovich Adler; Sara Adler
- Relatives: Celia Adler (half-sister); Jay Adler (brother); Julia Adler (sister); Stella Adler (sister); Allen Adler (nephew); Jerry Adler (cousin)

Luther Adler (born Lutha Adler; May 4, 1903 – December 8, 1984) was an American actor and theatre director. He was a leading member of the Group Theatre, and a member of a prominent New York acting dynasty, notably including his sister Stella Adler.

== Early life ==
Adler was born on May 4, 1903, in New York City, one of the six children of Russian-Jewish actors Sara and Jacob P. Adler. His father was considered to be one of the founders of the Yiddish theatre in America. His siblings also worked in theatre; his sister Stella Adler was an actress and drama teacher. His brother Jay also was an actor.

== Stage acting career ==
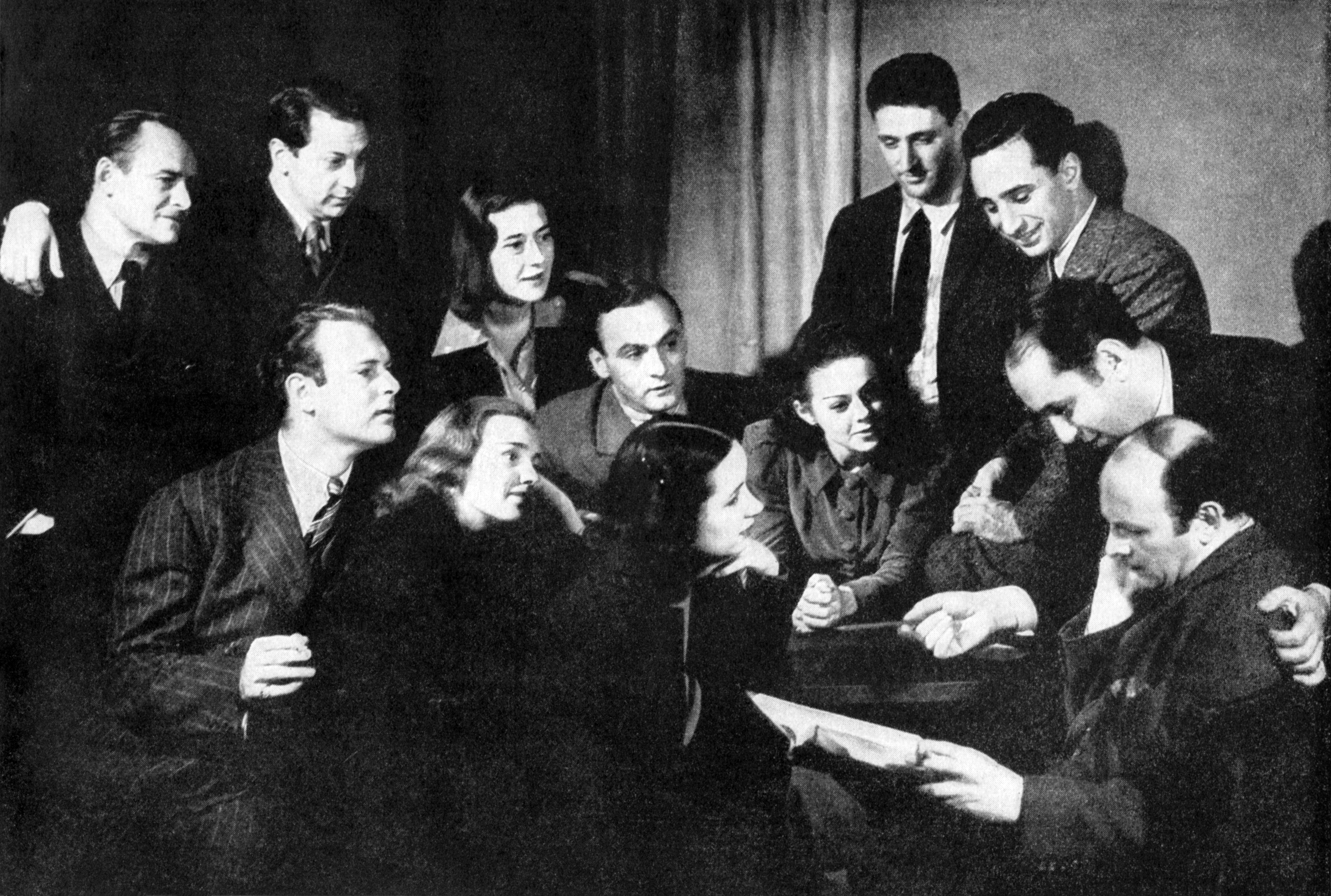
Adler (back row, second from left) with members of the Group Theatre in 1938

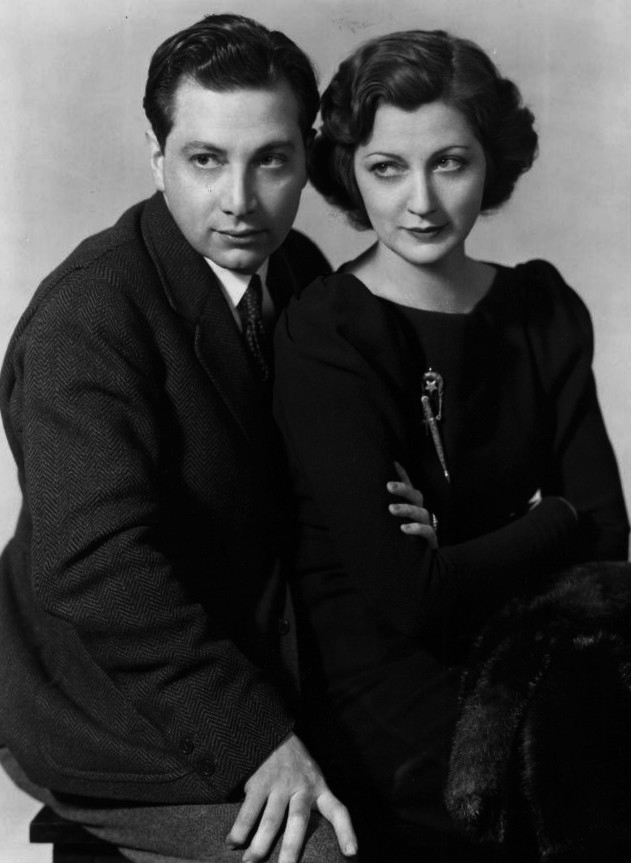
Adler and his sister Stella in a 1936 publicity photo for their appearance in the Group Theater production of Awake and Sing!

Adler's father gave him his first acting job in the Yiddish play, Schmendrick, at the Thalia Theatre in Manhattan in 1908; Adler was then 5 years old. His first Broadway plays were The Hand of the Potter in 1921; Humoresque in 1923; Monkey Talks in 1925; Money Business and We Americans in 1926; John in 1927; Red Rust (or Rust) and Street Scene in 1929.

In 1931, Adler became one of the original members of the Group Theatre (New York), a New York City theatre collective formed by Cheryl Crawford, Harold Clurman and Lee Strasberg. The founders, as well as the actors in the group, "tended to hold left-wing political views and wanted to produce plays that dealt with important social issues." The collective lasted for ten years, had twenty productions, and served as an inspiration for many actors, directors and playwrights who came after it. During those years, the Group's members included Luther, Luther's sister and brother, Stella Adler and Jay Adler, Elia Kazan, John Garfield, Paul Green, Howard Da Silva, Harry Morgan (billed as Harry Bratsburg), Franchot Tone, John Randolph, Joseph Bromberg, Michael Gordon, Will Geer, Clifford Odets and Lee J. Cobb. Elia Kazan considered Adler to be the best actor working in the company.

In 1932, Adler starred in John Howard Lawson's Success Story and garnered rave reviews for his performance. In 1933 Adler briefly joined the Katherine Cornell Company, playing opposite Cornell in Alien Corn, but in 1934 he returned to the Group and played alongside his sister Stella in Gold Eagle Guy. Gold Eagle Guy was not popular with audiences and had a short run. Adler had suspected the play would not succeed, remarking, shortly before it opened, "Boys, I think we're working on a stiff." Adler went on to appear in Group Theatre (New York) productions: Awake and Sing! and Paradise Lost (both 1935), and he performed with Frances Farmer in Golden Boy (1937). He also appeared in Kurt Weill's anti-war musical Johnny Johnson (1936) and originated the role of Captain Joshua in the 1939 Group Theater production of Thunder Rock. "By the late 1930s... the cohesiveness of the group began to crumble. The chronic financial problems and long-simmering disputes about 'the method' began to chip away at their solidarity... and in 1941 the group dissolved."

In the early 1940s, Adler began to direct, but his first production They Should Have Stood in Bed closed after only 11 performances in 1942. His next directorial venture, A Flag Is Born, ran for 120 performances in 1946 and featured newcomer Marlon Brando in one of the major roles. In 1965, when Zero Mostel left the Broadway cast of Fiddler on the Roof during a contract dispute, Adler took over the role of Tevye.

== Film and television career ==
In 1937, Adler began to appear in films, although they were never his highest priority. His credits included Cornered (1945), Wake of the Red Witch (1948), House of Strangers (1949), D.O.A. (1949), The Desert Fox: The Story of Rommel (1951) (appearing as Hitler), and M (1951). During the 1950s, Luther Adler was among the directors and actors who were blacklisted. He later appeared in Voyage of the Damned (1976) and Absence of Malice (1981).

He also acted on various television programs, including the anthology series, Crossroads, General Electric Theater, Kraft Television Theater, and Robert Montgomery Presents. In 1960, he guest-starred as a pawnbroker in theTwilight Zone episode "The Man in the Bottle" (again appearing as Hitler). He was also cast in episodes of The Untouchables, Ben Casey, 77 Sunset Strip, Mission: Impossible, Hawaii Five-O (most notably in the series' only three-part episode "'V' for Vashon"), The Streets of San Francisco, Naked City and Route 66.

== Personal life ==
Adler was married to actress Sylvia Sidney from 1938 until 1946 and was the father of Sidney's only child, her son Jacob, who predeceased her.

=== Death ===
Adler died at his Kutztown, Pennsylvania home and was buried in Mount Carmel Cemetery, Glendale, New York, next to several of his relatives, including his parents and older sister Stella.

== Media portayals ==
Adler is a character in Names, Mark Kemble's play about former Group Theatre members' struggles with the House Un-American Activities Committee.

== Filmography ==
=== Film ===
- Lancer Spy (1937) .... Schratt
- Cornered (1945) .... Marcel Jarnac
- Saigon (1948) .... Lt. Keon
- The Loves of Carmen (1948) .... Dancaire
- Wake of the Red Witch (1948) .... Mayrant Ruysdaal Sidneye
- House of Strangers (1949) .... Joe Monetti
- D.O.A. (1949) .... Majak
- Under My Skin (1950) .... Louis Bork
- Kiss Tomorrow Goodbye (1950) .... Keith 'Cherokee' Mandon
- South Sea Sinner (1950) .... Cognac
- M (1951) .... Dan Langley
- The Magic Face (1951) .... Rudi Janus / Adolf Hitler
- The Desert Fox: The Story of Rommel (1951) .... Adolf Hitler
- Hoodlum Empire (1952) .... Nick Mancani
- The Tall Texan (1953) .... John Tinnen
- The Miami Story (1954) .... Tony Brill
- Crashout (1955) .... Pete Mendoza
- The Girl in the Red Velvet Swing (1955) .... Delphin Delmas
- Hot Blood (1956) .... Marco Torino
- The Last Angry Man (1959) .... Dr. Max Vogel
- Cast a Giant Shadow (1966) .... Jacob Zion
- The Three Sisters (1966) .... Chebutykin
- The Sunshine Patriot (1968, TV Movie) .... Imre Hyneck
- The Brotherhood (1968) .... Dominick Bertolo
- Chelsea D.H.O. (1973, TV Movie) .... Dr. Levine, M.E.
- Crazy Joe (1974) .... Falco
- Paradise (1974, TV Movie)
- The Man in the Glass Booth (1975) .... Presiding Judge
- Live A Little, Steal A Lot (1975) .... Max 'The Eye'
- Mean Johnny Barrows (1976) .... Don Racconi
- Voyage of the Damned (1976) .... Prof. Weiler
- Absence of Malice (1981) .... Malderone (final film role)

=== Television ===
- Somerset Maugham TV Theatre, "Honolulu" (1951)
- Faith Baldwin Romance Theatre, "Portrait of Niki" (1951)
- The United States Steel Hour, "Hedda Gabler" ... Judge Brock (1954), "The Gamblers" ... Sidney West (1956)
- Studio One, "A Criminal Design" (1954), "Cauliflower Heart" ... Joe Rundle (1956)
- The Mask, "The Visitor" (1954)
- The Motorola Television Hour, "Nightmare in Algiers" ... General Fox (1954)
- Center Stage, "The Day Before Atlanta" ... Jubal Banks (1954)
- General Electric Theater, "Nora #1" ... Torvald Helmer (1954), "Man with a Vengeance" ... Warner Johnson (1955)
- Pond's Theater, "Billy Budd" (1955)
- Robert Montgomery Presents, "The Killer" (1955)
- Crossroads, "The Unholy Trio" ... Rabbi Rosenblum (1955)
- Playhouse 90, "The Last Clear Chance" ... Garvin (1958), "The Plot to Kill Stalin" ... Molotov (1958), "The Rank and File" ... Irving Werner (1959)
- Lamp Unto My Feet, "Antigone" (1958)
- The Play of the Week, "A Month in the Country" ... Ignaty Illyich Shpichelsky (1959)
- Westinghouse Desilu Playhouse, "Meeting at Appalachia" ... Sal Raimondi (1960)
- The Twilight Zone, "The Man in the Bottle" ... Arthur Castle (1960)
- The Untouchables, "Nicky" ... Gus Marco (1960), "Murder Under Glass" ... Emile Bouchard (1961), "Takeover" ... Charlie Zenko (1962)
- Naked City, "The Man Who Bit a Diamond in Half" ... Sean Wicklow (1960), "A Memory of Crying" ... Willard Manson (1961), "The Fingers of Henri Tourelle" ... Henri Tourelle (1961), "Make It Fifty Dollars and Add Love to Nona" ... Mr. Kovar (1962)
- The Islanders, "Escape from Kaledau" ... Frank Fellino (1961)
- The DuPont Show of the Month, "The Lincoln Murder Case" ... Edwin M. Stanton (1961)
- Straightaway, "The Leather Dollar" (1961) ... Manager
- Ben Casey, "The Insolent Heart" ... Dr. Michael Waldman (1961), "The White Ones Are Dolphins" ... Dr. Bowersox (1963)
- Target: The Corruptors, "Silent Partner" ... Victor Cobalt (1961), "The Wrecker" ... Jonathan (1962)
- Route 66, "Man Out of Time" ... Harry Wender (1962)
- 77 Sunset Strip, "5: Part 3" ... Thomas Allen (1963)
- Festival of Arts, "Sibelius: A Symphony of Finland" ... Voice of Sibelius (1965)
- Mission: Impossible, "Phantoms" ... Leo Vorka (1970)
- The Name of the Game, "Tarot" ... Marc Osborne (1970)
- The Psychiatrist, "God Bless the Children" (1970), "Such Civil War in My Love and Hate", "The Longer Trail", "Ex-Sgt. Randell File, U.S.A." and "Par for the Course" (1971) ... Dr. Bernard Altman (all episodes)
- Hawaii Five-O, " 'V' for Vashon: The Son", " 'V' for Vashon: The Father" and " 'V' for Vashon: The Patriarch" ... Dominick Vashon (1972), "How to Steal a Masterpiece" ... Charles Ogden (1974), "The Case Against McGarrett" ... Dominick Vashon (1975) (archive footage)
- Search, "Numbered for Death" ... Vollmar (1973)
- Hec Ramsey, "The Detroit Connection" ... Victor Bordon (1973)
- The Streets of San Francisco, "Mister Nobody" ... Victor (1974)
- The Making of 'Absence of Malice' (1982 documentary) ... Himself
