= Stella Adler =

American actress and acting teacher (1901–1992)

- Adler in Shadow of the Thin Man (1941)
- Born: February 10, 1901; New York City, U.S.
- Died: December 21, 1992 (aged 91); Los Angeles, California, U.S.
- Resting place: Mount Carmel Cemetery
- Education: New York University
- Occupations: Actress; acting teacher
- Years active: 1905–1992
- Spouses: Horace Eliascheff (m. 1923; div. 1930) Harold Clurman (m. 1942; div. 1959) Mitchell A. Wilson (m. 1966; died 1973)
- Children: 1
- Parents: Jacob Pavlovich Adler; Sara Adler
- Relatives: Celia Adler (half-sister); Jay Adler (brother); Julia Adler (sister); Luther Adler (brother); Allen Adler (nephew); Jerry Adler (cousin)

Stella Adler (February 10, 1901 – December 21, 1992) was an American actress and acting teacher. A member of Yiddish Theater's Adler dynasty, Adler began acting at a young age. She shifted to producing, directing, and teaching, founding the Stella Adler Studio of Acting in New York City in 1949. Later in life she taught part time in Los Angeles, with the assistance of her protégée, actress Joanne Linville, who continued to teach Adler's technique.

== Early life ==
Stella Adler was born in Manhattan's Lower East Side in New York City. She was the youngest daughter of Sara and Jacob P. Adler, the sister of Luther, Jay, Frances, and Julia Adler and half-sister of Charles Adler and Celia Adler. The Adlers were part of the Jewish-American Adler acting dynasty, which had its start in the Yiddish Theater District and was a significant part of the vibrant ethnic theatrical scene that thrived in New York from the late 19th century to the 1950s. Adler became the most famous and influential member of her family. She began acting at the age of four as a part of the Independent Yiddish Art Company of her parents.

== Career ==
Adler began her acting career at the age of four in the play Broken Hearts at the Grand Street Theatre on the Lower East Side, as a part of her parents' Independent Yiddish Art Company. She grew up acting alongside her parents, often playing roles of boys and girls. Her work schedule allowed little time for schooling, but when possible, she studied at public schools and New York University. She made her London debut, at the age of 18, as Naomi in Elisa Ben Avia with her father's company, in which she appeared for a year before returning to New York. In London, she met her first husband, Englishman Horace Eliashcheff; their brief marriage, however, ended in a divorce.

Adler made her English-language debut on Broadway in 1922 as the Butterfly in The World We Live In, and she spent a season in the vaudeville circuit. In 1922–23, the renowned Russian actor-director Konstantin Stanislavski made his only U.S. tour with his Moscow Art Theatre. Adler and many others saw these performances, which had a powerful and lasting impact on her career and the 20th-century American theatre. She joined the American Laboratory Theatre in 1925; there, she was introduced to Stanislavski's theories, from founders and Russian actor-teachers and former members of the Moscow Art Theater—Richard Boleslavsky and Maria Ouspenskaya. In 1931, with Sanford Meisner and Elia Kazan, among others, she joined the Group Theatre, New York, founded by Harold Clurman, Lee Strasberg, and Cheryl Crawford, through theater director and critic, Clurman, whom she later married in 1943. With Group Theatre, she worked in plays such as Success Story by John Howard Lawson, two Clifford Odets plays, Awake and Sing! and Paradise Lost, and directed the touring company of Odets's Golden Boy and More to Give to People. Members of Group Theatre were leading interpreters of the method acting technique based on the work and writings of Stanislavski.

In 1934, Adler went to Paris with Harold Clurman and studied intensively with Stanislavski for five weeks. During this period, she learned that Stanislavski had revised his theories, emphasizing that the actor should create by imagination rather than memory. Upon her return, she broke away from Strasberg on the fundamental aspects of method acting. In 1982, the day Strasberg died, Adler is said to have remarked, "It will take the theatre decades to recover from the damage that Lee Strasberg inflicted on American actors."

In January 1937, Adler moved to Hollywood. There, she acted in films for six years under the name Stella Ardler, occasionally returning to the Group Theater until it dissolved in 1941. Eventually, she returned to New York to act, direct, and teach, the latter first at Erwin Piscator's Dramatic Workshop at the New School for Social Research, New York City, before founding Stella Adler Conservatory of Theatre in 1949. In the following years, she taught Marlon Brando, Steve McQueen, Dolores del Río, Robert De Niro, Elaine Stritch, Martin Sheen, Manu Tupou, Harvey Keitel, Melanie Griffith, Peter Bogdanovich, Benicio del Toro, and Warren Beatty, among others, the principles of characterization and script analysis. She also taught at the New School, and the Yale School of Drama. For many years, Adler led the undergraduate drama department at New York University, and became one of America's leading acting teachers.

Stella Adler was much more than a teacher of acting. Through her work she imparts the most valuable kind of information—how to discover the nature of our own emotional mechanics and therefore those of others. She never lent herself to vulgar exploitations, as some other well-known so-called "methods" of acting have done. As a result, her contributions to the theatrical culture have remained largely unknown, unrecognized, and unappreciated.

—Marlon Brando

In 1988, she published The Technique of Acting with a foreword by Marlon Brando. From 1926 until 1952, she appeared regularly on Broadway. Her later stage roles include the 1946 revival of He Who Gets Slapped and an eccentric mother in the 1961 black comedy Oh Dad, Poor Dad, Mama's Hung You in the Closet and I'm Feelin' So Sad. Among the plays she directed was a 1956 revival of the Paul Green/Kurt Weill antiwar musical Johnny Johnson. She appeared in only three films: Love on Toast (1937), Shadow of the Thin Man (1941), and My Girl Tisa (1948). She concluded her acting career in 1961, after 55 years. During that time, and for years after, she became a renowned acting teacher.

== Stanislavski and the method ==
Adler was the only member of the Group Theatre to study with Konstantin Stanislavski. She was a prominent member of the Group Theatre, but differences with Lee Strasberg over Stanislavski's system (later developed by Strasberg into method acting) made her leave the group.

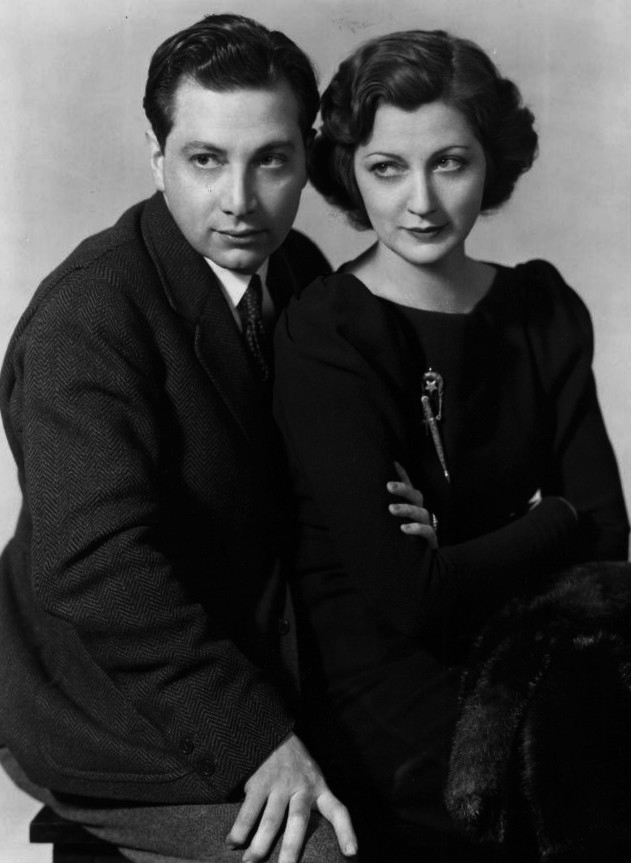
Luther and Stella Adler, 1936

Adler met with Stanislavski again later in his career and questioned him on Strasberg's interpretation. He told her that he had abandoned emotional memory, which had been Strasberg's dominant paradigm, but that they both believed that actors did not have what is required to play a variety of roles already instilled inside them, and that extensive research was needed to understand the experiences of characters who have different values originating from different cultures.

Like Stanislavski, Adler understood the "gold hidden" inside the circumstances of the text. Actors should stimulate emotional experience by imagining the scene's "given circumstances", rather than recalling experiences from their own lives. She also understood that 50% of the actor's job is internal (imagination, emotion, action, will) and 50% is externals (characterization, way of walking, voice, face). To find what works for the character, the actors must study the circumstances of the text and make their choices based on what one gets from the material.

For instance, if a character talks about horse riding, one needs to know something about horse riding as an actor, otherwise one will be faking. More importantly, one must study the values of different people to understand what situations would have meant to people, when those situations might mean nothing in the actor's own culture. Without this work, Adler said that an actor walks onto the stage "naked". This approach is one for which both Marlon Brando and Robert De Niro became famous.

Adler also trained actors' sensory imagination to help make the characters' experiences more vivid. She believed that mastery of the physical and vocal aspects of acting was necessary for the actor to command the stage, and that all body language should be carefully crafted and voices need to be clear and expressive. She often referred to this as an actor's "size" or "worthiness of the stage". Her biggest mantra was perhaps "in your choices lies your talent", and she encouraged actors to find the most grand character interpretation possible in a scene. Another favorite phrase of hers was, "Don't be boring".

Singer-songwriter Janis Ian studied under Adler in the early 1980s to help her feel more comfortable on stage, and the two women remained close friends until Adler's death. In her 2008 autobiography Society's Child, Ian recalled Adler having little patience for students who were not progressing as she wanted—going so far on one occasion as to take a coin from her purse and tell an actress, "Use this dime to call your mother. Tell her to come and pick you up, because you have no business in the theater." Ian relates that one night, when an actress refused to remove her dress at Adler's direction, Adler tore it from her body. "Oh, and by the way," Ian wrote, "the scene was brilliant after that."

== Personal life and death ==
Adler was related to Jerry Adler, an actor and theatre director.

Adler married three times: first to Horace Eliascheff—the father of her only child, Ellen—from 1923 to 1930; then from 1942 until 1959 to director and critic Harold Clurman, one of the founders of the Group Theatre. She was finally married to physicist and novelist Mitchell A. Wilson, from 1966 until his death in 1973. From 1938 to 1946, she was sister-in-law to actress Sylvia Sidney. Sidney was married to Luther Adler at the time and provided Stella with a nephew. Even after Sidney and Luther divorced, she and Sylvia remained close friends.

On December 21, 1992, Adler died from heart failure at the age of 91 in Los Angeles.

== Legacy ==
Adler's technique, based on a balanced and pragmatic combination of imagination and memory, is hugely credited with introducing the subtle and insightful details and a deep physical embodiment of a character. Elaine Stritch once said: "What an extraordinary combination was Stella Adler—a goddess full of magic and mystery, a child full of innocence and vulnerability." In the book Acting: Onstage and Off, Robert Barton wrote: "[Adler] established the value of the actor putting herself in the place of the character rather than vice versa ... More than anyone else, Stella Adler brought into public awareness all the close careful attention to text and analysis Stanislavski endorsed."

In 1991, Stella Adler was inducted into the American Theater Hall of Fame.

In 2004, the Harry Ransom Center at the University of Texas at Austin acquired Adler's complete archive along with a small collection of her papers from her former husband Harold Clurman. The collection includes correspondence, manuscripts, typescripts, lecture notes, photographs, and other materials. Over 1,100 audio and video recordings of Adler teaching from the 1960s to the 1980s have been digitized by the center and are accessible on site. The archive traces her career from her start in the New York Yiddish Theater District to her encounters with Stanislavski and the Group Theatre to her lectures at the Stella Adler Studio of Acting.

In 2006, she was honored with a posthumous star on the Hollywood Walk of Fame in front of the Stella Adler Theatre at 6773 Hollywood Boulevard.

Adler is a character in Names, Mark Kemble's play about former Group Theatre members' struggles with the House Un-American Activities Committee. Kemble consulted her about characterizations for the play and she told him to "just make it up".

== Stella Adler schools ==
Established in 1949, the Stella Adler Studio of Acting in New York opened a new studio in Los Angeles named the Art of Acting Studio in 2010 and is run by the Adler family.

Adler's protégée and longtime friend Irene Gilbert ran the Stella Adler Academy of Acting and Theatre in Los Angeles, established in 1985.

== Career on Broadway ==
All works are the original Broadway productions unless otherwise noted.

- The Straw Hat (1926)
- Big Lake (1927)
- The House of Connelly (1931)
- 1931 (1931)
- Night Over Taos (1932)
- Success Story (1932)
- Big Night (1933)
- Hilda Cassidy (1933)
- Gentlewoman (1934)
- Gold Eagle Guy (1934)
- Awake and Sing! (1935)
- Paradise Lost (1935)
- Sons and Soldiers (1943)
- Pretty Little Parlor (1944)
- He Who Gets Slapped – revival (1946)
- Manhattan Nocturne (1943)
- Sunday Breakfast (1952)

== Works ==
- The Fervent Years: The Group Theatre and the Thirties, By Harold Clurman, new introduction by Stella Adler. Da Capo Press, 1983. ISBN 0-306-80186-8.
- The Technique of Acting, by Stella Adler. Bantam Books, 1988. ISBN 0-553-05299-3.
- Creating a Character: A Physical Approach to Acting, by Moni Yakim, Muriel Broadman, Stella Adler. Applause Books, 1993. ISBN 1-55783-161-0.
- Stella Adler: The Art of Acting, by Stella Adler, Howard Kissel, Applause Books, 2000. ISBN 1-55783-373-7.
- Stella Adler on Ibsen, Strindberg, and Chekhov, by Stella Adler, Barry Paris. Random House Inc, 2001. ISBN 0-679-74698-6.
- Stella Adler on America's Master Playwrights: Eugene O'Neill, Thornton Wilder, Clifford Odets, William Saroyan, Tennessee Williams, William Inge, Arthur Miller, Edward Albee, by Stella Adler, Barry Paris (editor). Knopf Doubleday Publishing Group 2012. ISBN 978-0-679-42443-7.

== See also ==
- Michael Chekhov
- Ivana Chubbuck
- Ion Cojar
- Uta Hagen
- Estelle Harman
- Robert Lewis
- Sanford Meisner
- Constantin Stanislavski
  - Stanislavski's system
- Lee Strasberg
- List of stars on the Hollywood Walk of Fame
