= Mach 1: A Story of Planet Ionus =

1957 novel by Allen Adler

- Cover of Terror on Planet Ionus
- Author: Allen A. Adler
- Language: English
- Genre: Science fiction novel
- Publisher: Farrar, Straus and Cudahy
- Publication date: 1957
- Publication place: United Kingdom
- Media type: Print (Hardcover)
- Pages: 212 pp

Mach 1: A Story of Planet Ionus is a 1957 science fiction novel by Allen A. Adler. A paperback version was published in 1966 by Paperback Library with the alternate title Terror on Planet Ionus.

== Synopsis ==
While testing an experimental warship, the "Mach 1", a human pilot and his companion are kidnapped into space by aliens from the planet Ionus, which turns out to be a moon of Saturn. There, they confront an oversized monster named Karkong who is menacing the Ionians. Karkong follows them back to Earth. Chaos ensues.

== Critical reception ==
Damon Knight wrote of the novel:

This is no novel: it is half-heartedly "novelized" screen story. The blank-faced characters stand up and speak their lines woodenly, without any perceptible motivation; of characterization, explanation, depth of any kind there is none...[the book is] so bad that ordinary epithets will not do. It is incredibly, stupidly, loathsomely bad... The style is pretentious, ignorant and vulgar.
