= Sara Adler =

Russian-born American actress in the Yiddish theater

- סערע אַדלער
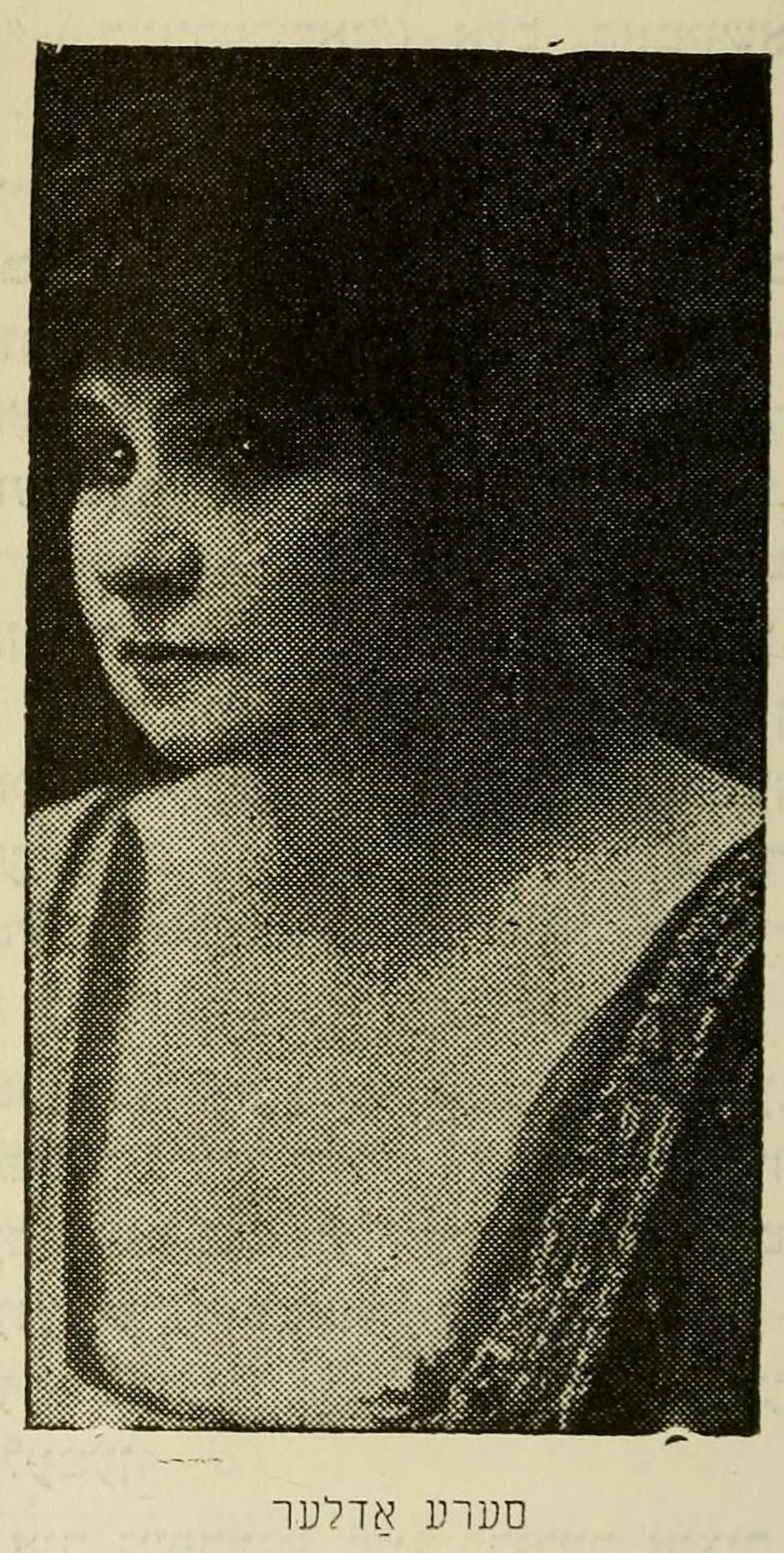
- Born: Sara Levitskaya; May 26, 1858; Odessa, Russian Empire
- Died: April 28, 1953 (aged 94); New York City, U.S.
- Occupation: Actress
- Years active: 1866–1928
- Spouses: Maurice Heine (m. bef. 1883; div. 1890); Jacob Pavlovich Adler (m. 1891; died 1926)
- Children: 7; including Jay, Julia, Stella, Luther

Sara Adler (née Levitskaya; (Note: Some sources give Levitsky or Levitzky.) changed to Lewis; Russian: Сара Левицка Адлер; Yiddish: שרה לעוויטסק אַדלער; May 26, 1858 – April 28, 1953) was a Russian actress in Yiddish theater who made her career mainly in the United States. She was known as the "mother" or "duchess" of Yiddish theater.

She was the third wife of Jacob Adler and the mother of prominent actors Luther and Stella Adler, and lesser-known actors Jay, Julia, Frances, and Florence Adler. The most famous of her 300 or so leading roles included the redeemed prostitute Katusha Maslova in Jacob Gordin's play based on Tolstoy's Resurrection and Batsheva in Gordin's The Homeless. She introduced "realism" in acting before it became an American movement.

== Early life ==
Sara Levitzky was born to well-to-do merchant parents, Ellye and Pessye Levitzky, in Odessa in the Russian Empire (present-day Ukraine). Levitzky attended a Russian school, where she first performed on the stage at eight years old as Emilia in The Robbers. She trained in voice at the Odessa Conservatory before transitioning to a career in Yiddish theater. During her teens, she performed in local amateur productions. She grew up speaking Russian, only learning Yiddish through her participation in Yiddish theater.

== Early career in Europe ==
When Adler joined a Yiddish troupe at seventeen, she was hired to sing Russian songs after the play as a part of the divertissement due to her lack of fluency in Yiddish. (Note: Jacob Adler recorded that when she first performed at his London theater around 1886, "she spoke no Yiddish ... but came out before the curtain and sang Russian songs".)

In Russia, she married Maurice Heine (born Haimovitz), the leader of a provincial Yiddish theater troupe.

After the ban on Yiddish theater in Imperial Russia, Maurice and Sara Heine left in 1881 for London, when Alexander II of Russia's assassination led to a Russian ban on Yiddish theater. There, Heine's troupe joined with Jacob Adler's and then in 1883 for New York City. As "Madam Heine," Sara was the leading lady in Shomer's The Orphans.

== Career in America ==
In 1890, Maurice and Sara divorced. She joined Adler's Finkel-Feinman-Mogulesko troupe as its principal actor for both dramatic and operetta roles. In 1891 she married Adler, himself recently divorced from a brief second marriage to Dinah Shtettin. She and Adler would be among the most prominent actors in Yiddish theater in New York for the next three decades. According to Harold Clurman, who married their daughter Stella, Sara taught Jacob about acting and helped him gain confidence on the stage.

In 1891, Adler acted in a production of Siberia by Jacob Gordin that her husband directed, which was seen as the beginning of serious Yiddish theater (in contrast to the previous vaudeville and melodrama). The next year, she acted in The Yiddish King Lear as Teitele, a role she reprised for the next thirty years. She went on to create many serious character roles in plays by Gordin, H. Leivick, and Peretz Hirschbein. She also portrayed characters from plays written in other languages in Yiddish translations, such as Nora in A Doll's House. She and Jacob became professionally and financially successful, at the center of the community of Jewish artists and intellectuals.

Both she and Jacob starred in the 1908 play The Worthless written by Jacob Gordin. In 1911, she appeared in Gordin's play Elisha Ben Abuyah (originally staged in 1906). In 1914, she starred in the silent film Sins of the Parents directed by Ivan Abramson. The film was one of only two movies in which she appeared. After her husband's 1920 stroke and 1926 death, she performed infrequently. On March 14, 1939, her 50 years of work were honored at the National Theater, where she performed the third act of Resurrection.

Although probably most remembered for her lead roles opposite her husband, Sara Adler also set out on her own with the Novelty Theater in Brooklyn, where she presented (in Yiddish) works of Ibsen and Shaw well before they were familiar to an English-language audience. She also presented works of the French feminist Eugène Brieux. After Rudolph Schildkraut quarreled with Max Reinhardt in Vienna, Sara Adler brought him to Brooklyn to play the husband in Gordin's stage adaptation of Leo Tolstoy's The Kreutzer Sonata. That production also included Jacob Ben-Ami (associated with the Vilna Troupe, as well as Adler offspring Stella and Luther Adler.

== Later life and death ==
Though she did not act much in her old age, Adler remained active. In her 70s, she began learning to tango, and stayed out past midnight with friends every night until her last illness. Adler died in New York City on April 28, 1953, following a long illness.

== Personal life ==
Adler had two sons with Heine, Joseph and Max Heine.

The Adlers had five children together, Frances (1892), Jay (1896), Julia (1899), Stella (1902), and Luther (1903), all of whom acted. They had a tumultuous marriage, with many infidelities, separations, and reconciliations. At one point, Sara entered a sanatorium after one of her husband's infidelities; at another, she took a lover and planned to establish a rival theater before a bout of tuberculosis led her to abandon those plans and return to her husband. Once, when Jacob Adler left her to live with a mistress, Sara Adler and Rudolph Schildkraut formed their own company, with Sara doing everything from acting and directing to designing and sewing costumes and polishing the fruit sold at intermission.

== Readings ==
- Adler, Jacob, A Life on the Stage: A Memoir, translated and with commentary by Lulla Rosenfeld, Knopf, New York, 1999, ISBN 0-679-41351-0. 266, passim.
- Adler, Sara, on the Encyclopædia Britannica Women in American History site. Retrieved February 22, 2005.
