= Dinah Shtettin =

English-born Yiddish theater actress

- Born: Poland
- Died: 1946
- Occupation: Yiddish theatre actress
- Spouses: Jacob Pavlovich Adler (1887-1891; divorced); Siegmund Feinman (?-1909)
- Children: Celia Adler; Lillie Feinman

Dinah Shtettin (akas: Dina Stettin and Dinah Feinman (דיינע פיינמאן); died 1946) (Note: Shtettin's date of birth is unknown, with possible dates including 1862, 1869, and 1872. 1869 is based on the supposition that she was about sixteen when she met Jacob Adler.) was an English Yiddish theater actress. She was the second wife of Jacob Adler, with whom she had a daughter, Celia Adler, in 1889.

== Early life ==
Dinah Shtettin was born in Poland to strict Orthodox Jewish parents. As a young child, her family moved to London. She began her theatrical career as a teenager in the chorus of Israel Grodner's London troupe in the mid-1880s, eventually winning small parts and joining the troupe when the Grodners went to Paris. When she was about sixteen, she met Jacob Adler, then a widower, who took a liking to her. At this time, he was in a relationship with Jenny Kaiser, with whom he had become romantically involved while still married to his first wife, Sonya. Adler and Kaiser had a son, Charles.

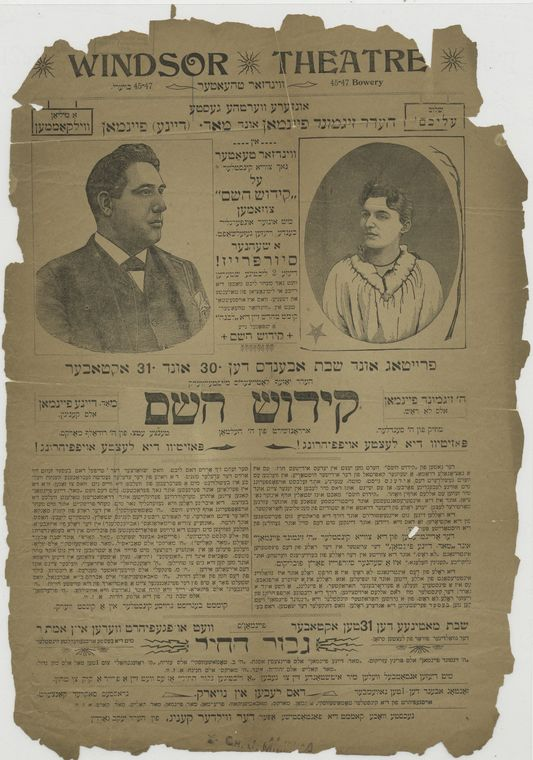
Advertisement for Joseph Lateiner's play Kidesh Hashem starring Sigmund and Dinah Feinman.

Shtettin's father disapproved of both Adler and the theater, but did not restrict his daughter's wishes. He stated, "Let it be a divorce tomorrow, but marriage it must be!" The couple married in 1887, after which Adler and his troupe travelled to the United States. After he returned to London for seven months, he once again journeyed to New York in 1889 and was shortly followed by Dinah. Their daughter Celia was born in New York later that year. Shtettin divorced Adler when he eloped with Sara Heine two years later, in 1891. Despite acrimony between them, Shtettin went on to perform with her ex-husband's troupe on the American Yiddish stage. She travelled back to London to act to great popularity; in 1909, a woman was crushed to death in the effort to get the best seats to see her at the London Pavilion.

Shtettin later married playwright and actor Siegmund Feinman; they raised Celia together. Celia took her stepfather's surname in childhood, but took her father's name in her career, becoming a leading actress on the Yiddish stage. Shtettin and Feinman had another daughter, actress Lillie (Lili) Feinman, who married Yiddish actor Ludwig Satz. Siegmund Feinman died in 1909.

== Stage career ==
Shtettin's New York debut was in the role of Fanya, the villain's daughter, in Jacob Gordin's Siberia (1892). Commercially unsuccessful at the time, this first play of Gordin's is now considered a landmark in the evolution of Yiddish theater.
