= Jacob Spivakofsky =

19th-century Russian Yiddish theatre producer

Jacob Spivakofsky was one of the first stars in the early years of Yiddish theater. Although Spivakofsky’s birthday is unknown, it is estimated to be in 1844 or 1845. He was born the highly cultured scion of a wealthy Odessa Jewish family. Spivakofsky had an academic education and was already a well-traveled young man who, by Jacob Adler's account "acted with talent and taste in Russian amateur theatricals" and "recited the poetry of Pushkin with something close to genius" (Adler, 1999, 60) when he was sent in 1877 to Bucharest, Romania as a foreign correspondent for an Odessa newspaper, to cover the Russo-Turkish War. He crossed paths with Abraham Goldfaden, who only a year earlier had founded the first professional Yiddish-language theater troupe, and abandoned journalism to become a romantic leading man.

He soon left Goldfaden's troupe along with fellow Odessite Israel Rosenberg. They briefly toured (with a repertoire purloined from Goldfaden) in Moldavia, but the end of the war dried up the supply of free-spending merchants and middlemen who had briefly made Yiddish theater in Romania a prosperous enterprise. At the suggestion of Jacob Adler, they came back to Odessa, where Spivakofsky was the first leading man in Rosenberg's new Odessa-based troupe, the first professional Yiddish theater troupe in Imperial Russia. (Adler, 1999, 60, 68)

== Bibliography ==
- Adler, Jacob, A Life on the Stage: A Memoir, translated and with commentary by Lulla Rosenfeld, Knopf, New York, 1999, ISBN 0-679-41351-0.
