= Sonya Adler =

Yiddish theatre performer

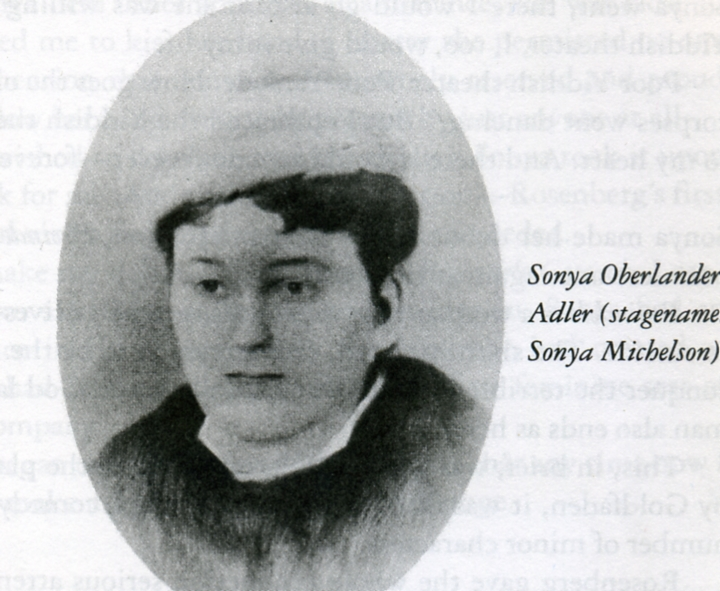
Sonya Oberlander Adler, Yiddish player. 1862-1884.

Sophia "Sonya" Adler (née Oberlander; c. 1862 – 1886), also known by her early stage name Sonya Michelson, was a Russian actress who was one of the first women to perform in Yiddish theater in Imperial Russia. Later she became the first wife of actor Jacob Adler, with whom she relocated to London in 1883, after Yiddish theater was banned in Russia.

== Life ==
Sophia Oberlander was born to a Jewish family in Odessa in the Russian Empire (now Ukraine), in 1859, descended from Jews from the Courland (now Latvia). Jacob Adler, in his memoir, remarks that at the time he met her, she was a student at the University of Odessa, who, like him, spoke Yiddish and Russian, but also spoke much better German than he, and also excellent French. He adds that "like all the best young people of the day" she was a nihilist, a "serious young student and revolutionary", and that her (and her family's) passion for theater, and their vision of what Yiddish theater could become, kept him in the profession through the difficult early years of his career as an actor. Her debut as a professional actress (Odessa, 1878) was in the title role of Abraham Goldfaden's darkly comic operetta Breindele Cossack, in the troupe of Israel Rosenberg, the first Yiddish theater troupe in Imperial Russia; at first she played opposite Jacob Spivakovsky, but she pulled strings so that Jacob Adler, to whom she was already close at the time, would get the role. The next few years of theatrical touring had their ups and downs; initially, so did her relationship with Adler, but they married in Poltava in 1880.

The February 1881 assassination of Tsar Alexander II was calamitous for the Jews of Russia, for Yiddish theater, and for the Adlers. At that time, the Adlers were in Goldfaden's troupe, and had been expecting soon to play in Saint Petersburg. The mourning for the tsar meant there would be no performances in the capital; in addition the political climate of Russia turned sharply against the Jews. Goldfaden's troupe soldiered on for a time—to Minsk, to Bobruisk where they played mainly to Russian soldiers, and to Vitebsk, where Jacob and the pregnant Sonya had to sue Goldfaden for their pay, and left to rejoin Rosenberg, playing in a tent theater in Nezhin. However, their fortunes soon proved even worse: provocateurs were traveling around the empire, stirring up pogroms, one of which soon swept through Nezhin. The troupe managed to avoid bodily harm by partly by convincing the rioters that they were a French theater troupe and partly by making judicious use of the money the Adlers had won in court from Goldfaden.

After a few more months of continuing to perform in Łódź and Zhytomyr, Sonya returned to her parents' house in Odessa to give birth to her daughter Rivkah (Rebecca), who later died in London at the age of 3. Sonya, too, died in London, from an infection contracted while giving birth to her second child, Abram ("Abe") Adler, in 1886 at age 27.

== Sources ==
- Adler, Jacob, A Life on the Stage: A Memoir, translated and with commentary by Lulla Rosenfeld, Knopf, New York, 1999, ISBN 0-679-41351-0
