= Leon Kobrin =

American dramatist (1873–1946)

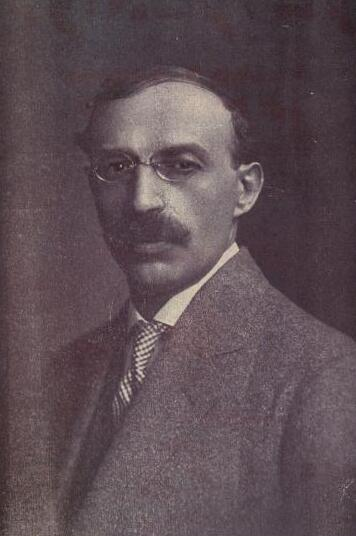
Kobrin in 1910

Leon Kobrin (1873^{1}–1946) was a playwright in Yiddish theater, writer of short stories and novels, and a translator. As a playwright he is generally seen as a disciple of Jacob Gordin, but his mature work was more character-driven, more open and realistic in its presentation of human sexual desire, and less polemical than Gordin's. Many of his plays were "ghetto dramas" dealing with issues of tradition and assimilation and with generational issues between Jewish immigrants to America and the first generation of American-born Jews.

== Life and works ==
Born in Vitsebsk, then part of Russian Empire, now in Belarus, he wrote at first in Russian (Schulman & Denman 2007). In 1892 he emigrated to the United States, settling in Philadelphia, Pennsylvania; only then did he develop an interest in Yiddish literature and theater (Schulman & Denman 2007).

In the U.S. he first worked menial jobs in Philadelphia, as well as in rural Pennsylvania, and New Jersey, before moving to New York City (Sandrow 1986, p. 172). He became a journalist, then a writer of short stories, and finally gained fame as a playwright.

He began writing in Yiddish by translating stories from Russian; the first original story he published was "A merder oys libe" (A Murderer for Love), which appeared in the newspaper Filadelfyer Shtot-Tsaytung, in 1894 (Schulman & Denman 2007).

Kobrin's first play, Mine (Minna), was rewritten and adapted by Jacob Gordin for a production in 1899, with the original text appearing in print later the same year (Sandrow 1986, p. 169-170; Schulman & Denman 2007). Gordin's strong influence on Kobrin's work is reflected in his next play, Natur, Mensh un Khaye (Nature, Man and Beast, 1900), which consciously alludes to Gordin's Got, Mensh un Tayvl (God, Man, and the Devil, 1893). Liptzin singles out Kobrin's tragedy Yankel Boyle (1908, based on his own 1898 story) as the "apex" of his work, and describes its title character as "a kindhearted but dull-witted Jewish youth … embroiled in a complex moral and emotional dilemma to which he could find no solution short of suicide" (Liptzin 1972, p. 81).

Kobrin's 30 or so plays spanned both "golden ages" of Yiddish theater in America. When he started as a playwright at the turn of the 20th century, Yiddish theater was bringing to America challenging modern classics, such as the works of Henrik Ibsen and August Strindberg, and Leo Tolstoy, sometimes before these had yet been presented on the English-language American stage; and his career continued into the era of the art theater movement in Yiddish, exemplified in New York by Maurice Schwartz's Yiddish Art Theatre.

Kobrin continued, throughout his life, to contribute to Yiddish-language newspapers. He also worked extensively as a translator of modern classics from French and Russian into Yiddish. Among the authors whose work he translated were Guy de Maupassant, Émile Zola, Maxim Gorky, Leo Tolstoy, Fyodor Dostoevsky, and Anton Chekhov. His wife, Pauline, collaborated on some of these translations.

== Works ==
=== Plays ===
- Minna, or The Ruined Family from Downtown (1899)
- Natur, Mensh un Khaye (Nature, Man and Beast, 1900)
- Ghetto Dramas (1904)
- The East Side Ghetto
- Sonia from East Broadway
- Yankel Boyle oder Der Dorfs-Yung (1908, translated as The Village Youth or The Child of Nature)
- The Immigrants (1910)
- Die Next-Door'ike (The Lady Next Door, 1915)
- The Black Sheep (1915)
- The Secret of Life (1915)
- Rise of Orre (1917)
- The Tenement House (1917)
- Call of Life (1920)
- The Awakening (1920)
- Wild Ways (1926)
- Riverside Drive (1933)
- Ruined Worlds (1934)
- The Last Struggle (1934)
- The Golden Stream (1936)
- The Red Lola (1937)

=== Other works ===
- "A Moerder aus Liebe" ("The Love Crime", 1894)
- "Yankel Boila or, The Village Youth" (story, 1898)
- Yankel Boila and Other Tales (collection, 1898)
- A Lithuanian Village (novel, English translation published 1920)
- My Fifty Years in America (memoir, serialized in the Morning Freiheit mid-1940s)

== Notes ==
^{1} This is the year given by Liptzin. Sandrow and the Cambridge History give 1872.
