= David Kessler (actor) =

American actor (1860–1920)

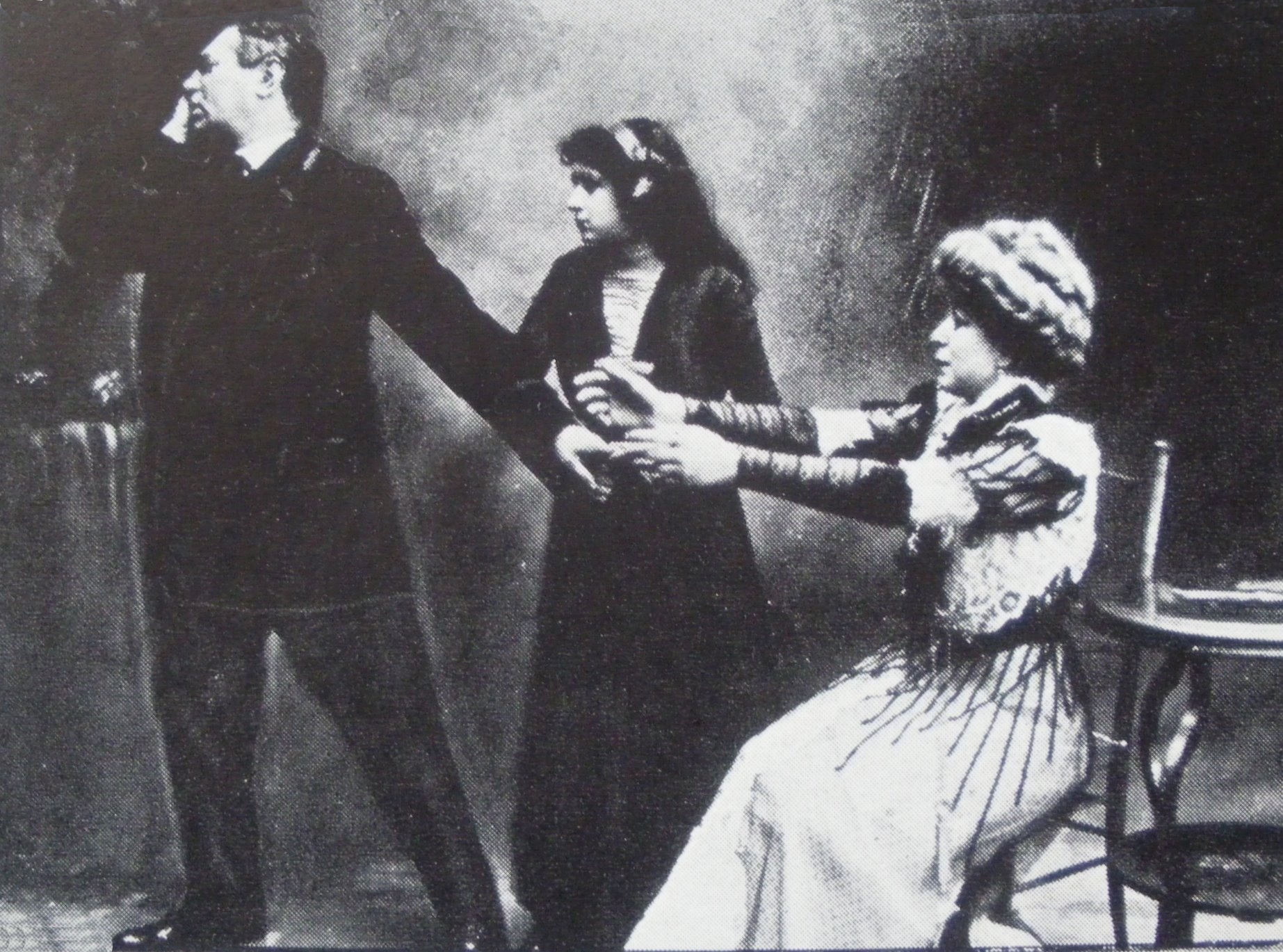
David Kessler, Jennie Goldstein, and Malvina Lobel in Joseph Lateiner's "The Jewish Heart"

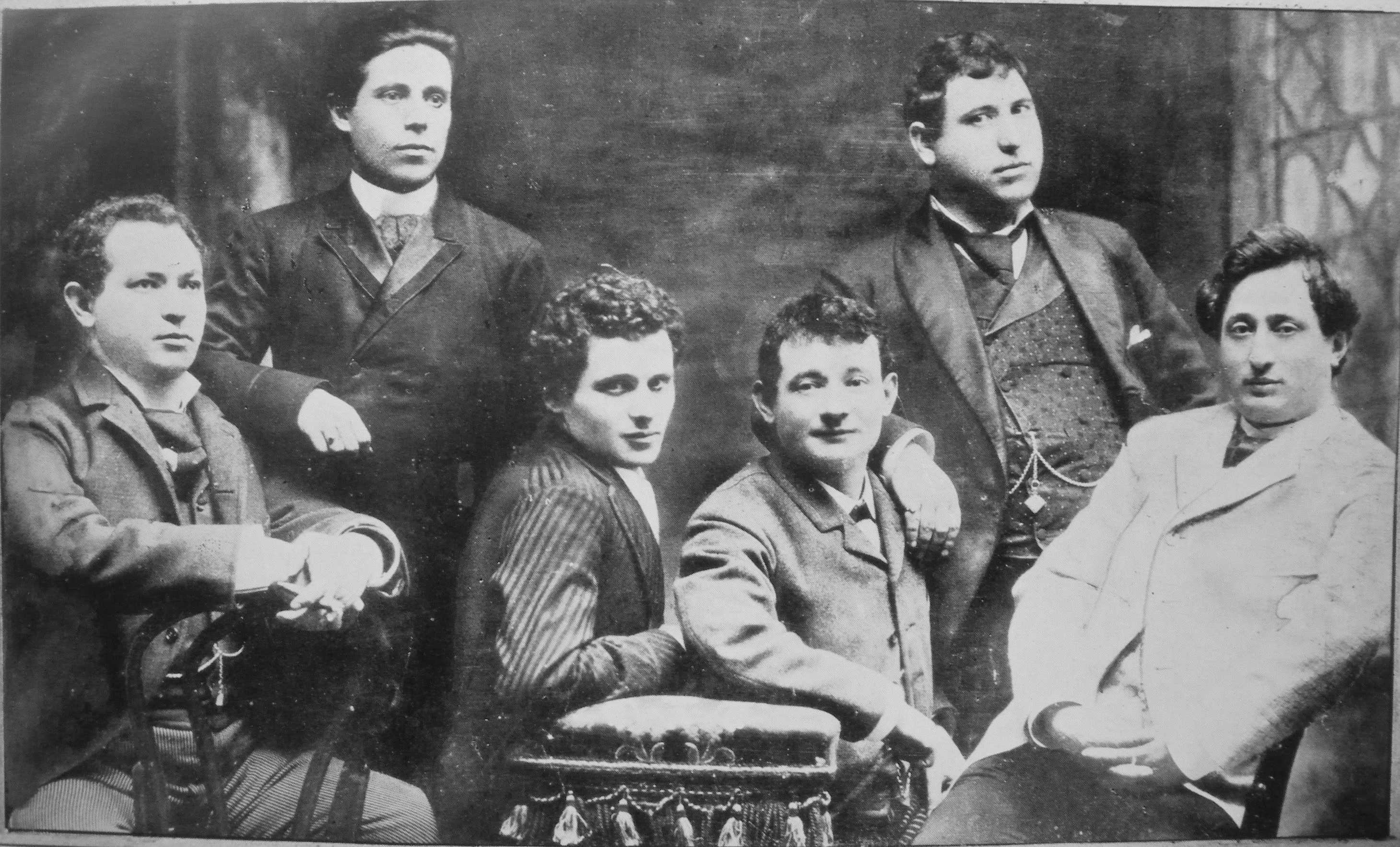
from right: Jacob P. Adler, Zigmund Feinman, Zigmund Mogulesko, Rudolf Marx, Mr. Krastoshinsky, and David Kessler, 1888

David Kessler (1860–1920) was a prominent actor in the first great era of Yiddish theater. As a star Yiddish dramatic performer in New York City, he was the first leading man in Yiddish theater to dispense with incidental music.

== Early life ==
Born and raised in Chişinău (then part of Imperial Russia, now the capital of independent Moldova), as an adolescent he improvised chaotic amateur plays in the stable of his father's inn, using fragments of what he had seen in the performances of Broder singers. A medical student named Geller apparently wrote him a more structured play, Mechtze the Matchmaker, which he and his friends put on.

== Early career ==
At 16, he tried out for Israel Rosenberg's theater troupe when they passed through town for a month. He was offered a position as an extra, but his father forbid him to go on the road. Three years later he joined a different small travelling troupe, and spent three years travelling through Europe with that troupe, first in Russia and then in Romania.

He moved to London in 1886, then immigrated to the United States in 1890, settling in New York City. In one of the first Yiddish-language productions of Shakespeare, he played the title role in Othello, opposite Jacob Adler's Iago. He was responsible for bringing Bertha Kalich to America.

== American Yiddish Theatre ==
In New York Kessler resumed his career. In 1891 he acted under Jacob Adler in Jacob Gordin's first play "Siberia". Later he appeared in other Gordin plays, including "God, Man, and Devil". Others of his outstanding roles were in Sholem Asch's "God of Vengeance", David Pinski's "Yankel the Smith", and Leon Kobrin's "Yankel Boile".

He appeared at all the principal Lower East Side theatres in the Yiddish Theater District: the Thalia Theatre, the People's Theatre, and the Windsor Theatre.

In 1899 he was awarded the Thalia Theatre in a divorce settlement from his wife Jennie. Kessler's Thalia Theatre was located at 46-48 Bowery between Bayard and Canal Streets, across the street from the Windsor Theatre in Manhattan. He was listed as being the Lessee and Manager; Sigmund Mogulesko is the Regisseur and B. Young is the theatre manager.

In 1913 he established the David Kessler Theater, which ranked equally with Adler's and Boris Thomashefsky's theaters, and produced many plays by the leading Yiddish writers.

In 1918 he starred in 'Mish Mash' with Nellie Casman at Edelstein's People's Theater.

The New York Times called him, "One of the leading Yiddish actors in the United States . . ."

He was the manager of Kessler's Second Avenue Theatre.

His acting roles were many and varied.

He was married to Rachel (née Wilner) Kessler. She owned the "Wilner Full Dress Parlor" on the Lower East Side.

== Death ==
He became ill while on stage at the Lyric Theatre in Brooklyn, New York during his performance of Jacob Gordin's dramatization of Tolstoy's "The Kreutzer Sonata". He died on May 14, 1920, in Beth Israel Hospital from complications following an operation. He is buried in Washington Cemetery in Brooklyn, New York along with his wife Rachel Kessler.
