= Breindele the Cossack =

1887 Yiddish-language play

Breindele the Cossack (Yiddish: בריינדעלע קאָזאַק, Breindele kozak, Brayndele kozak) is a darkly comic 1887 Yiddish-language play by Abraham Goldfaden, generally accounted one of the best of his early works. The title character is a woman who, at the start of the play, has already driven five husbands to suicide. The play is centered on her and her sixth husband, Guberman, who marries her fully aware of her history and believing he will be different; however, she ultimately drives him to suicide as well.

It was first performed in Romania in 1887 and was never published.

The name had become an epithet among Yiddish speakers for a tough, strong-willed Yiddish woman, "crazy bitch", in the patriarchal Jewish society, as opposed to an "eyshes khayl" (Biblical "woman of valor"), a good wife, who knows her place.
