= Julia Adler =

American actress (1897–1995)

Julia Adler (July 4, 1897 – June 3, 1995), also known as Julia Adler Foshko, was an American actress who was the last surviving child of actor Jacob Pavlovich Adler. She was known for among other roles playing Jessica to her father's Shylock and appearing in the plays of Jacob Gordin.

== Biography ==
Starting as a child in Yiddish theater she made her Broadway debut in 1919 as Starblossom in John Masefield's The Faithful at the Garrick Theatre. Her other Broadway credits included Rosa Goldran in Howard E. Rose's Rosa Machree (1922), Jessica in William Shakespeare's The Merchant of Venice (1922-1923), and Bessie Berger in Clifford Odets's Awake and Sing! (1939); the latter role her final Broadway appearance.In 1952 she starred in the revival of Jacques Deval and Robert E. Sherwood's Tovarich at New York City Center as Madame Chauffourier-Dubieff..

Born in Philadelphia, she died in Englewood, New Jersey where she had lived many years at the Actors Fund Home.
