= Nizhyn =

City in Chernihiv Oblast, Ukraine

Nizhyn Ніжин
- City
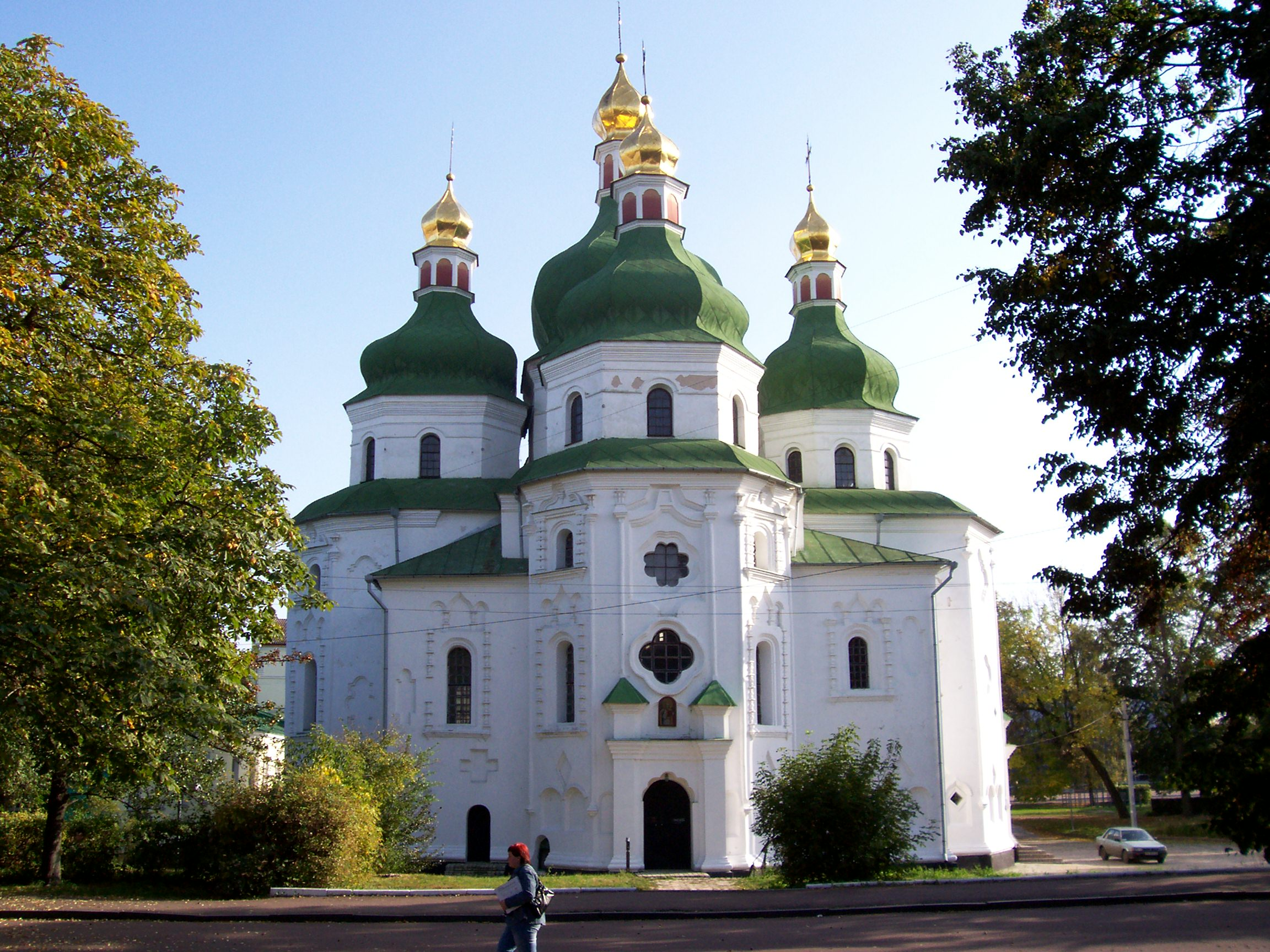
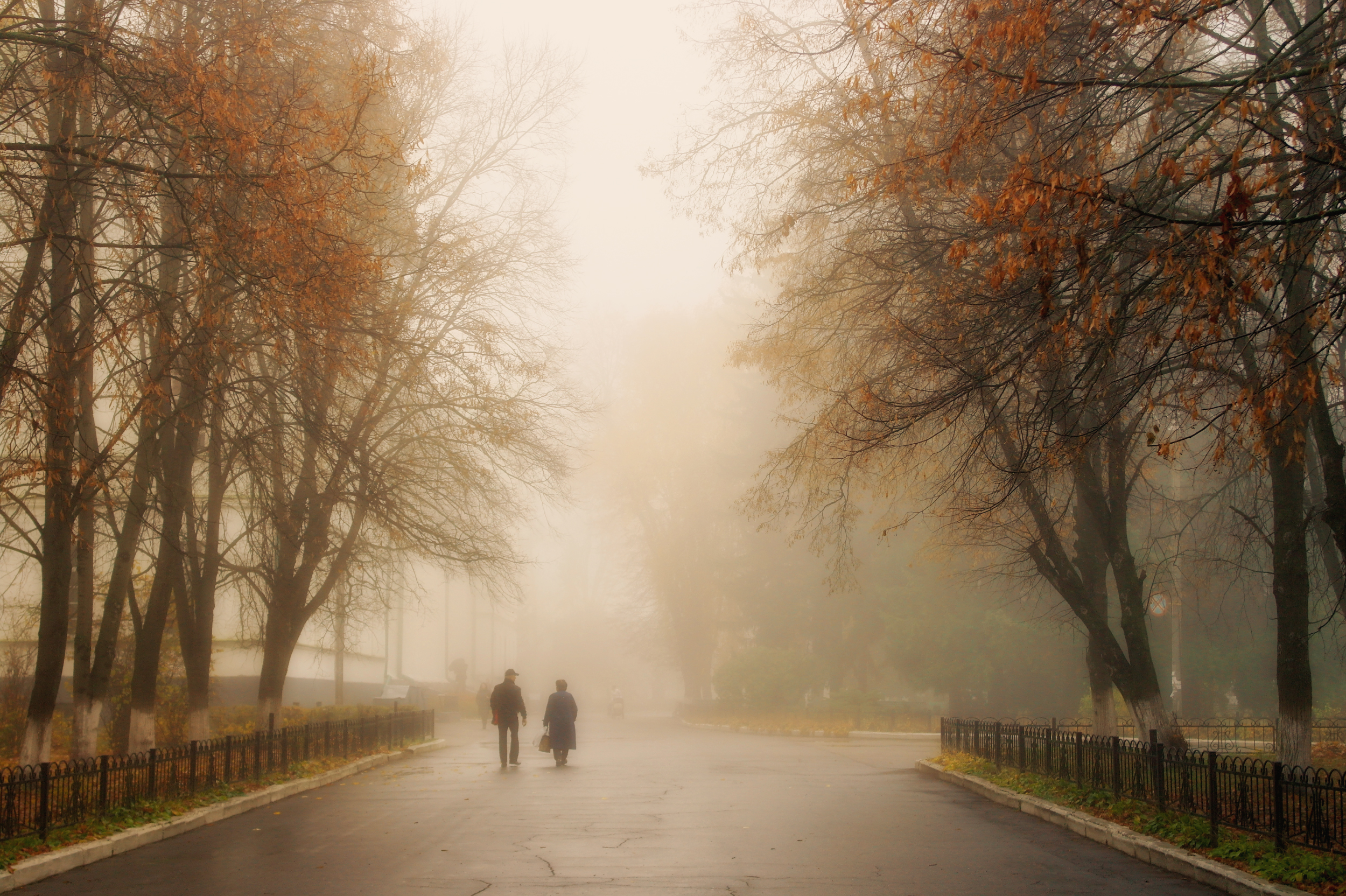
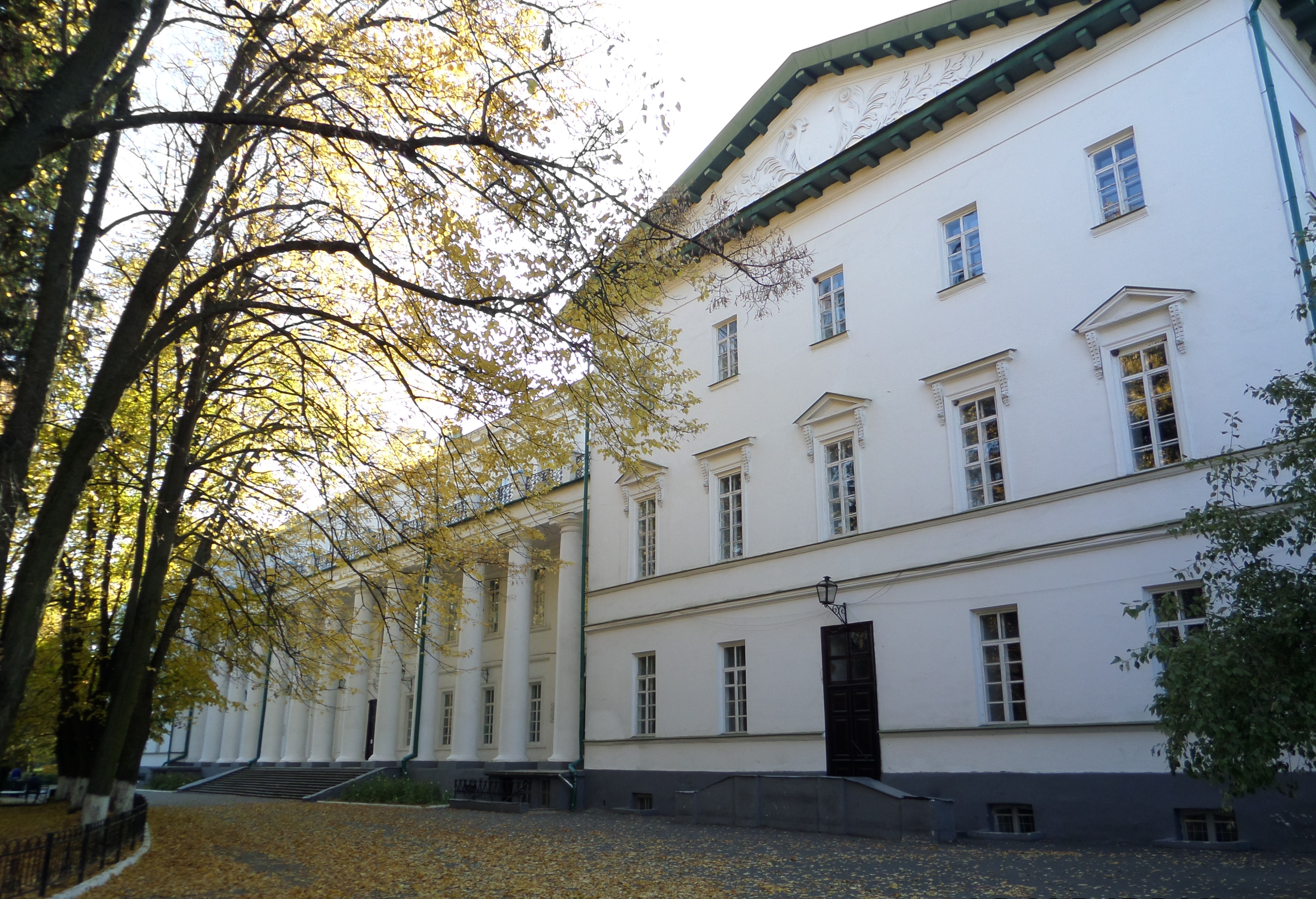
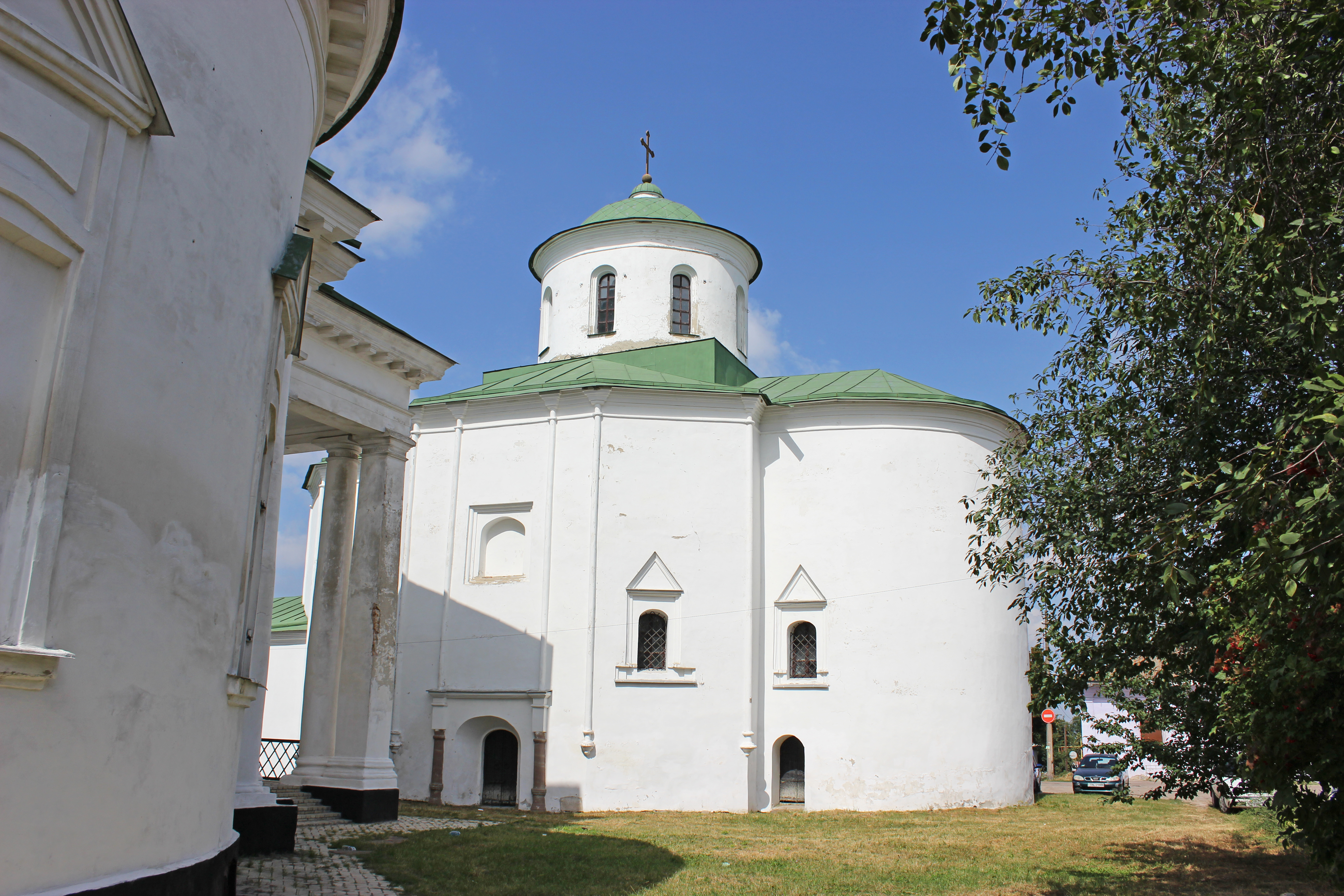
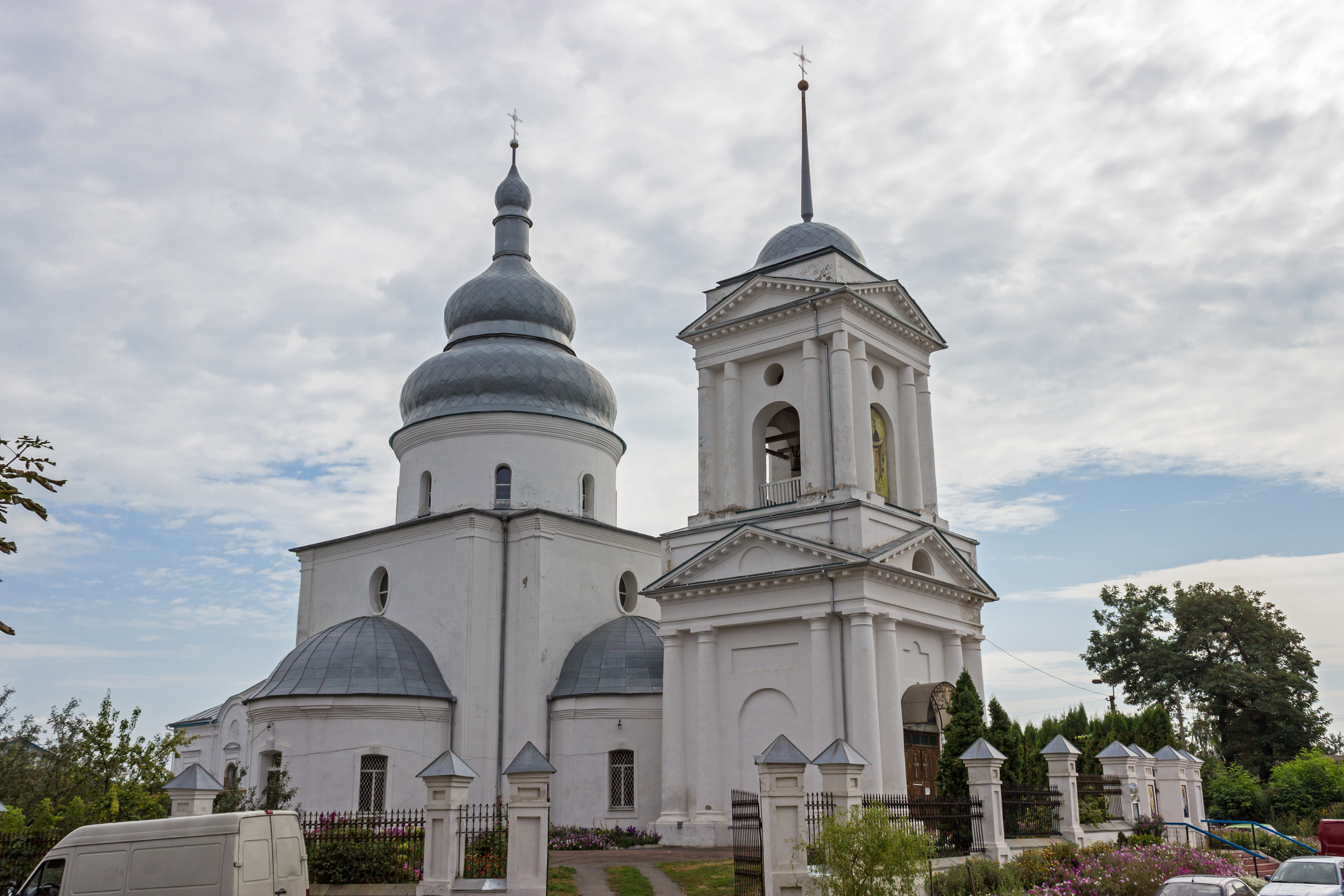
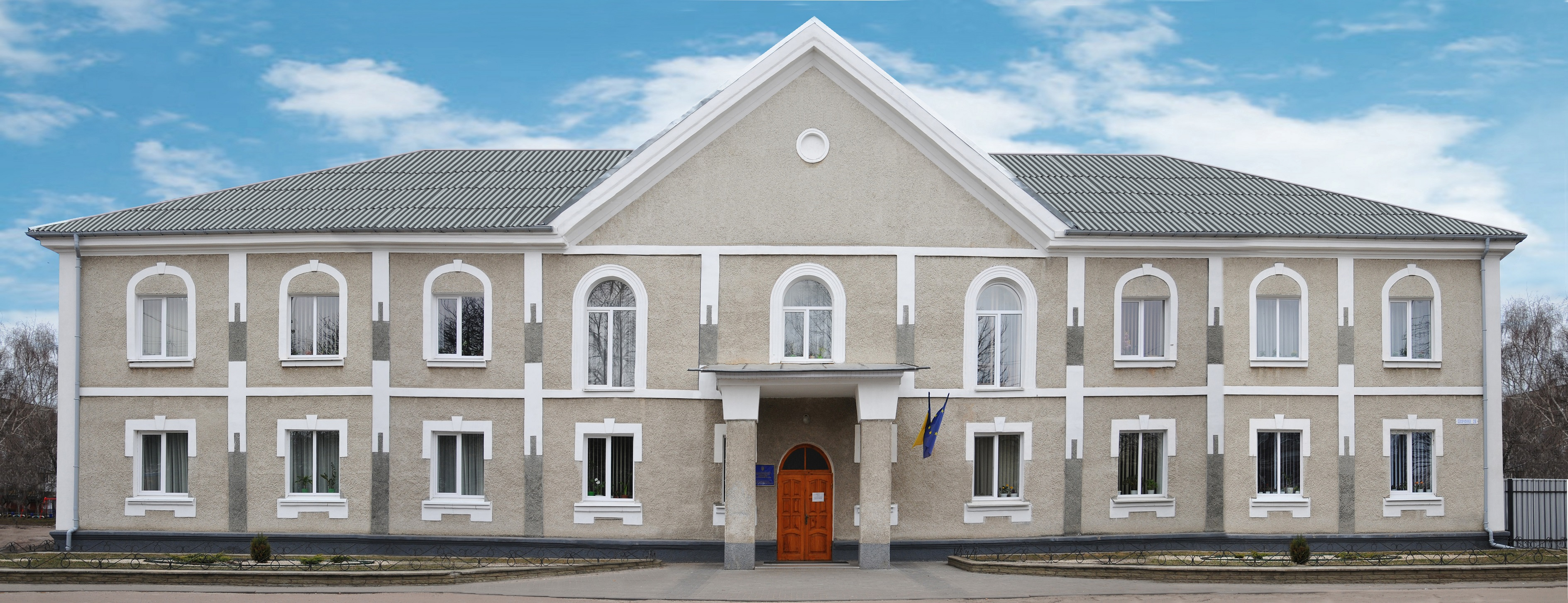
- Clockwise from top: St. Nicholas Cathedral; Nizhyn Gogol State University; Intercession Church; Nizhyn Agrotechnical College; St. Michael's Church; Count's Park

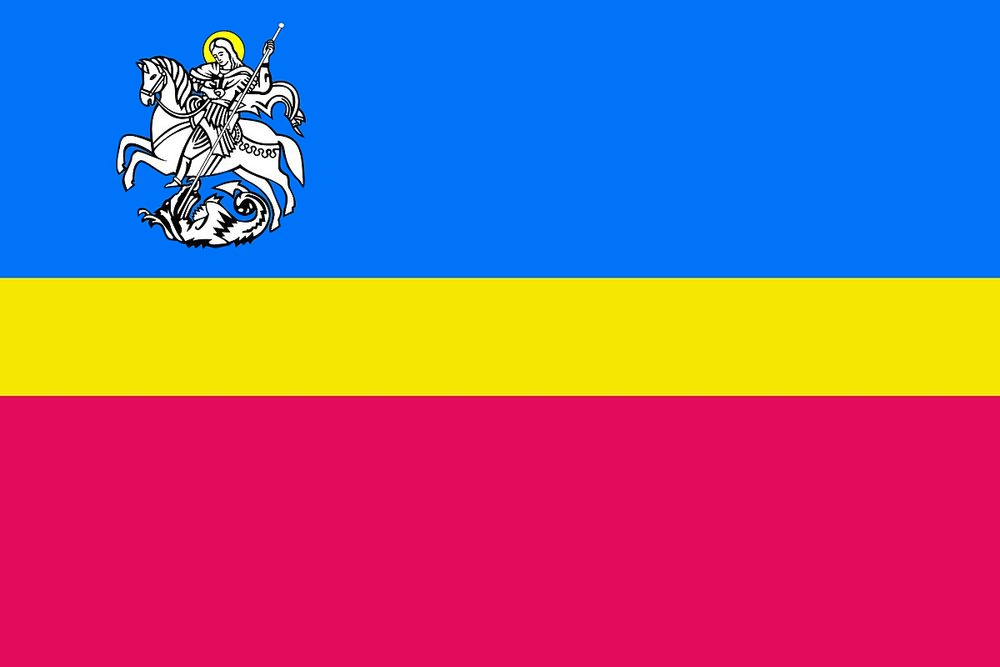
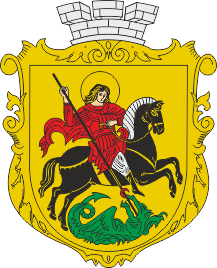
- Flag Coat of arms
- Interactive map of Nizhyn
- Location of Nizhyn in Chernihiv Oblast Nizhyn (Ukraine)
- Coordinates: 51°02′17″N 31°53′10″E
- Country: Ukraine
- Oblast: Chernihiv Oblast
- Raion: Nizhyn Raion
- Hromada: Nizhyn urban hromada
- Magdeburg rights: 1625

Area
  - Total: 43.2 km^{2} (16.7 sq mi)

Population (2022)
  - Total: 65,830
- Website: http://www.nizhynrada.org

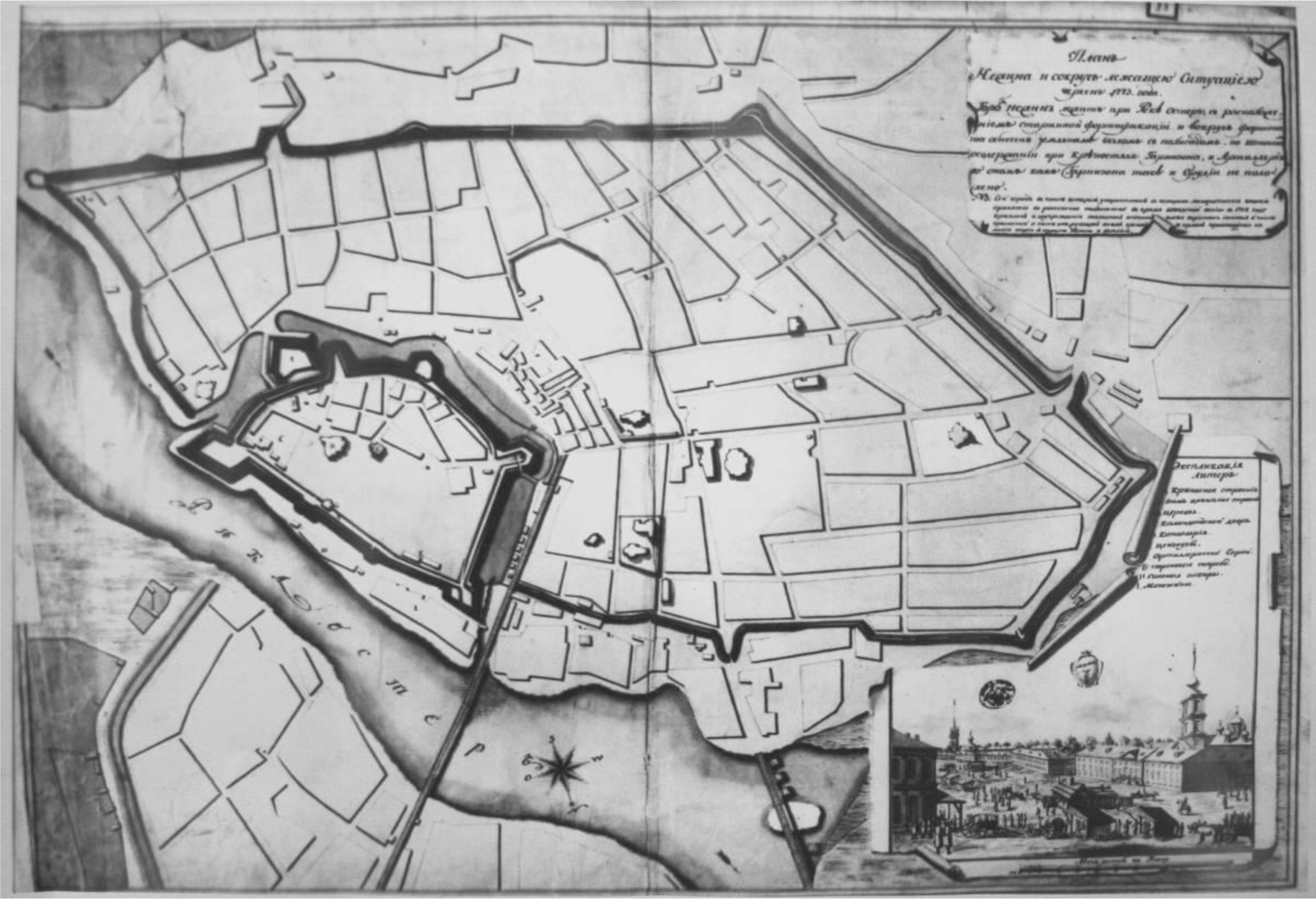
1773 map of the Nizhyn fortress and its citadel

Nizhyn (Ukrainian: Ніжин, pronounced [ˈn⁽ʲ⁾iʒɪn]; Russian: Нежин, romanized: Nezhin) is a city located in Chernihiv Oblast of northern Ukraine along the Oster River. The city is located 116 km (72 mi) north-east of the national capital Kyiv. Nizhyn serves as the administrative center of Nizhyn Raion. It hosts the administration of Nizhyn urban hromada which is one of the hromadas of Ukraine and was once a major city of the Chernigov Governorate. Nizhyn has a population of 65,830 (2022 estimate).

== History ==
The earliest known references to the location go back to 1147, when it was briefly mentioned as Unenezh. At that time it belonged to the Principality of Chernigov. It was destroyed by Tatars during the 13th century. Around 1500 the territory was ceded to the Tsardom of Moscow, where it stayed until the Treaty of Deulino. The town was restored in the early 17th century, and in 1618 fell under the rule of Poland.

In the times of the Polish–Lithuanian Commonwealth, Nizhyn was granted Magdeburg rights (1625) as a self-governing town. Between 1648 and 1781 it served as the centre of Nizhyn Regiment, an administrative unit of the Cossack Hetmanate. In 1663 Nizhyn was the place of the Black Council of Ukrainian Cossacks, which elected Bryukhovetsky as the new Hetman of the Zaporizhian Host thus conditionally dividing Ukraine (Cossack Hetmanate) into Left-bank Ukraine and Right-bank Ukraine.

In the Cossack Hetmanate, Nizhyn had six voivodes (a Muscovite military position) from 1665 to 1697. The voivodes of the city were Ivan Rzhevskiy (1665–1672), Stepan Khruscheov (1672–1673), Prince Vladimir Volkonskiy (1673–1675), Prince Semeon Zvenigorodskiy (1673–1675), Avraam Khitrovo (1689–1692), and Ivan Saveolov the Younger (1692–1697).

Located on a crossing of trade routes, during the 17th and 18th centuries Nizhyn was one of the biggest trading centres in Left-bank Ukraine.The city was famous for its fairs, which took place on Pokrova Day and were the biggest event of this type in the whole Left-bank Ukraine. Nizhyn also housed a thriving Greek community, enjoyed a number of privileges in trade and self-government granted by Bohdan Khmelnytsky and Ivan Mazepa. In 1687 the local Greeks established their own brotherhood, and during the early 18th century they became fully independent from the regimental administration. Between 1785 and 1870 a separate Greek magistrate functioned in the city.

In 1782 Nizhyn became a povit centre of Chernigov Viceroyalty. In 1797 it was incorporated into the Little Russia Governorate, and in 1802 became part of Chernihiv Governorate, of which it was the biggest city. In 1805, the Bezborodko Lyceum was established there (today — Nizhyn Gogol State University); its graduates include Nikolai Gogol whose statue graces one of city streets as well as Yevhen Hrebinka among other graduates. Nizhyn has also long been noted for its famous cucumbers.

With the opening of Black Sea ports, Nizhyn's importance as a trading point declined, and in 1847 its fairs were abolished. Many Greek merchants left the city, moving to Taganrog, Mariupol and Odesa. Until the Revolution of 1917 it remained a center of vegetable and tobacco trade. Under the Soviet rule the city developed as a centre of food, metal and light industry. During the 1930s many of Nizhyn's architectural monuments were destroyed.

During World War II, Nizhyn was occupied by the German Army from 13 September 1941 to 15 September 1943.

In July 1969 two Tupolev Tu-22 aircraft from the nearby air base collided in mid-air. The crew ejected and the plane flew on unpiloted for 52 minutes, threatening the city of Nizhyn before crashing 0.5 km (0.31 miles) from the city's railway station.

In 2017, Ukraine issued a postage stamp featuring the coat of arms of Nizhyn.

Until 18 July 2020, Nizhyn was designated as a city of oblast significance and did not belong to Nizhyn Raion even though it was the center of the raion. As part of the administrative reform of Ukraine, which reduced the number of raions of Chernihiv Oblast to four, the city was merged into Nizhyn Raion.

=== Jewish population ===
Nizhyn was once a major center of Hasidic Judaism and is the site of the Ohel (tomb) of the Hasidic master, Rabbi Dovber Schneuri of Chabad-Lubavitch. Jews first settled in Nizhyn at the beginning of the 19th century after the partition of Poland. By 1847, 1,299 Jews had registered as residents. In 1897, 24% of the population, or 7,361 residents, were Jewish.

A wave of pogroms severely affected the Jewish population in 1881 and 1905. One group of emigrants settled in Philadelphia and founded the Neziner Congregation in 1896.

During their retreat from the Germans in the spring of 1918, the Red Army carried out additional pogroms. During World War II, the region was occupied by German Army, who murdered all Jews in the area. Only those who escaped survived.

In 1959, 1,400 Jews lived in Nizhyn, about 3% of the town's population. In 2005, Nizhyn population reached 80,000. Only about 300 Jewish families lived in the city.

=== Modern times ===
The city of Nizhyn is one of the ancient cities of Ukraine. The architectural complex of the city forms an expressive ensemble of an ancient trade city. The experts' estimates distinguish more than 300 ancient buildings, where 70 are of a great cultural and historical value. The expressive 200 years ensemble of Post Station (the only one preserved in Ukraine) deserves special mention. Nizhyn is a city of students (each fifth inhabitant of Nizhyn is a student). The following educational establishments operate in Nizhyn – State University named after Gogol; Agro-technical College, faculty of Kremenchyk Institute of Economy and New Technologies, College of Culture and Arts named after Zankovetska, Medical College, Nizhyn Professional Lyceum of Services, Nizhyn Agrarian Lyceum, vocational college, Lyceum at the university. There are four club institutions, the Drama Theater named after Kotsiubynskyi, the Choreographic school and park landscapes in the city.

The city boasts 38 libraries with the total fund of 17,365 thousand books, which caters for 44,429 readers, more than a dozen of museums, including Nizhyn Regional museum with the following sections: art, history, Nizhyn Post Station, with about 31 thousand of exhibits of the main fund, the Museum of the History of School No.3, the Museum of the History of School No.7 with a room of M. V. Nechkina, the Korolyov Museum in School No.14, the Glory Museum of Agrarian and Technical Institute, the Museum-Chemists shop named after M. Ligda. The following institutions function at Nizhyn State Pedagogical Institute named after Gogol: The Museum of Gogol, Art Gallery, the Museum "Rare book", zoological museum, and botanical museum. Nizhyn is a well-known industrial center, where 16 industrial enterprises, which belong to 8 branches, operate. Nizhyn is also an attractive tourist city. It is included into the tour "Necklace of Slavutych".

== Geography ==
=== Climate ===
Climate data for Nizhyn (1981–2010)
Month	Jan	Feb	Mar	Apr	May	Jun	Jul	Aug	Sep	Oct	Nov	Dec	Year
Mean daily maximum °C (°F)	−1.6 (29.1)	−0.8 (30.6)	4.9 (40.8)	13.9 (57.0)	20.9 (69.6)	23.8 (74.8)	25.7 (78.3)	25.0 (77.0)	18.9 (66.0)	12.1 (53.8)	3.9 (39.0)	−0.6 (30.9)	12.2 (54.0)
Daily mean °C (°F)	−4.3 (24.3)	−4.1 (24.6)	0.8 (33.4)	8.5 (47.3)	14.8 (58.6)	18.0 (64.4)	19.8 (67.6)	18.6 (65.5)	13.1 (55.6)	7.3 (45.1)	1.0 (33.8)	−3.1 (26.4)	7.5 (45.5)
Mean daily minimum °C (°F)	−7.0 (19.4)	−7.0 (19.4)	−2.7 (27.1)	3.6 (38.5)	8.7 (47.7)	12.5 (54.5)	14.2 (57.6)	12.9 (55.2)	8.2 (46.8)	3.3 (37.9)	−1.4 (29.5)	−5.6 (21.9)	3.3 (37.9)
Average precipitation mm (inches)	36.1 (1.42)	38.0 (1.50)	32.7 (1.29)	45.3 (1.78)	57.0 (2.24)	73.3 (2.89)	80.9 (3.19)	57.8 (2.28)	61.1 (2.41)	42.9 (1.69)	47.3 (1.86)	44.0 (1.73)	616.4 (24.27)
Average precipitation days (≥ 1.0 mm)	8.7	9.1	7.8	7.4	8.4	9.2	8.9	6.5	7.6	7.2	8.1	9.3	98.2
Average relative humidity (%)	85.4	82.6	78.2	70.3	67.5	72.0	72.9	73.2	78.5	81.8	87.4	87.5	78.1
Source: World Meteorological Organization

== Demographics ==
Historical population
Year	Pop.	±%
1860	18,000	—
1897	32,000	+77.8%
1926	38,000	+18.8%
1939	39,000	+2.6%
1959	46,000	+17.9%
1966	53,000	+15.2%
2001	76,059	+43.5%
2022	65,830	−13.4%

As of the 2001 Ukrainian census, Nizhyn had a population of 76,059 people, which makes it the second-largest city in the entire Chernihiv Oblast. The city's population is ethnically overwhelmingly Ukrainian, but also has notable Russian and Belarusian minorities, as well as smaller minority groups, which primarily originate from the post-Soviet realm. The exact ethnic and linguistic composition was as follows:

Ethnic groups in Nizhyn
	percent
Ukrainians	90.23%
Russians	7.13%
Belarusians	0.39%
Gypsies	0.19%
Jews	0.18%
Armenians	0.12%
Poles	0.06%
Moldovans	0.06%
Tatars	0.06%
others	1.58%

Native languages in Nizhyn
	percent
Ukrainian	89.5%
Russian	8.9%
Romani	0.1%
Belarusian	0.1%
Armenian	0.1%
others	0.1%

== Attractions ==
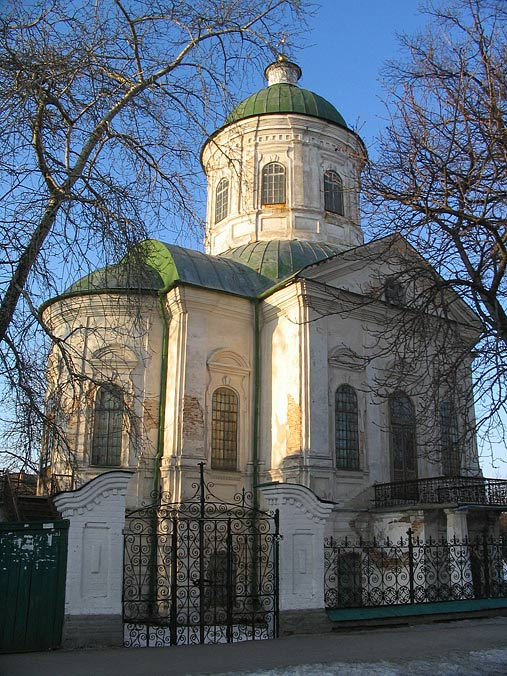
John the Apostle Church in Nizhyn

Architecturally Nizhyn was shaped in the 18th century. Foremost among its buildings must be mentioned its seven Baroque churches: Annunciation Cathedral (1702–1716, modernised 1814), Presentation Cathedral (1788), St. Michael's Church of the Greek community (1719–1729), St John's Church (1752, illustrated, to the right), Saviour's Transfiguration Church (1757), Intercession Church (1765), and the so-called Cossack Cathedral of St. Nicholas (1658, restored 1980s), a rare survival from the days of Nizhyn's Cossack glory, noted for its octagonal vaults and drums crowned by archetypal pear-shaped domes. Other notable buildings include the Trinity Church (1733, rebuilt a century later), the Greek magistrate (1785), and the Neoclassical complex of the Nizhyn Lyceum (designed by Luigi Rusca, built in 1805–1817, expanded in 1876–1879).

There is the memorial museum of Russian naval officer and explorer Yuri Lisyansky in his family house in Nizhyn and a monument by the house.

== Industry ==
Modern Nizhyn is a major industrial center. The city has 16 companies and firms from eight industries:

- Engineering:
  - NEC "Progress" – the production of photographic supplies, hunting scopes, medical equipment, household goods;
  - JSC "Mechanical Plant" – manufacture of machinery for agriculture;
  - Plant "Nezhinselmash" – poultry equipment, motorcycles, bicycles, spare parts, fittings for gas and vodogonov;
  - Nizhynske Training and Production Enterprise "UTOS" – covers of metal for home canning, switches, electric sockets, nails, clips, extension cords.
- Food:
  - Nizhynskyi cannery – the leading state-owned enterprise for the production of canned vegetables;
  - JSC "Nizhyn bread" – the production of bakery, confectionery and pasta;
  - JSC "Nizhyn brewery" (stopped in the summer of 2008) – the production of beer;
  - JSC "Nizhyn zhirkombinat" – manufacture and sale of varnishes, lacquers, oils, makukha.
- Medicine:
  - LLC "Lab scanning devices" – the production of medical equipment, optical and electronic devices, rubber means;
  - LLC RDC "Metecol" – the production of medical products using and training simulators.
- Light:
  - JSC "DiSi Nezhinka" – design and manufacture of clothing;
- Dry:
  - JSC "Nifar" – the production and supply of paints, detergents, toothpastes, plant protection products;
- Timber:
  - Of "Furniture Factory"

PVKF ** "Courier";

- Building:
  - JSC "Plant management of construction materials";
- "Printing":
  - LLC "Aspect".

Starting in 1915, the city was served by a tram public transportation system. The tram system had a track gauge of 1,524 mm (5 ft) and first began as horse-pulled trams at its opening in 1915. The system became defunct in the mid-1920s and never recovered. Information on the number of lines that existed is not available.

== Gallery ==
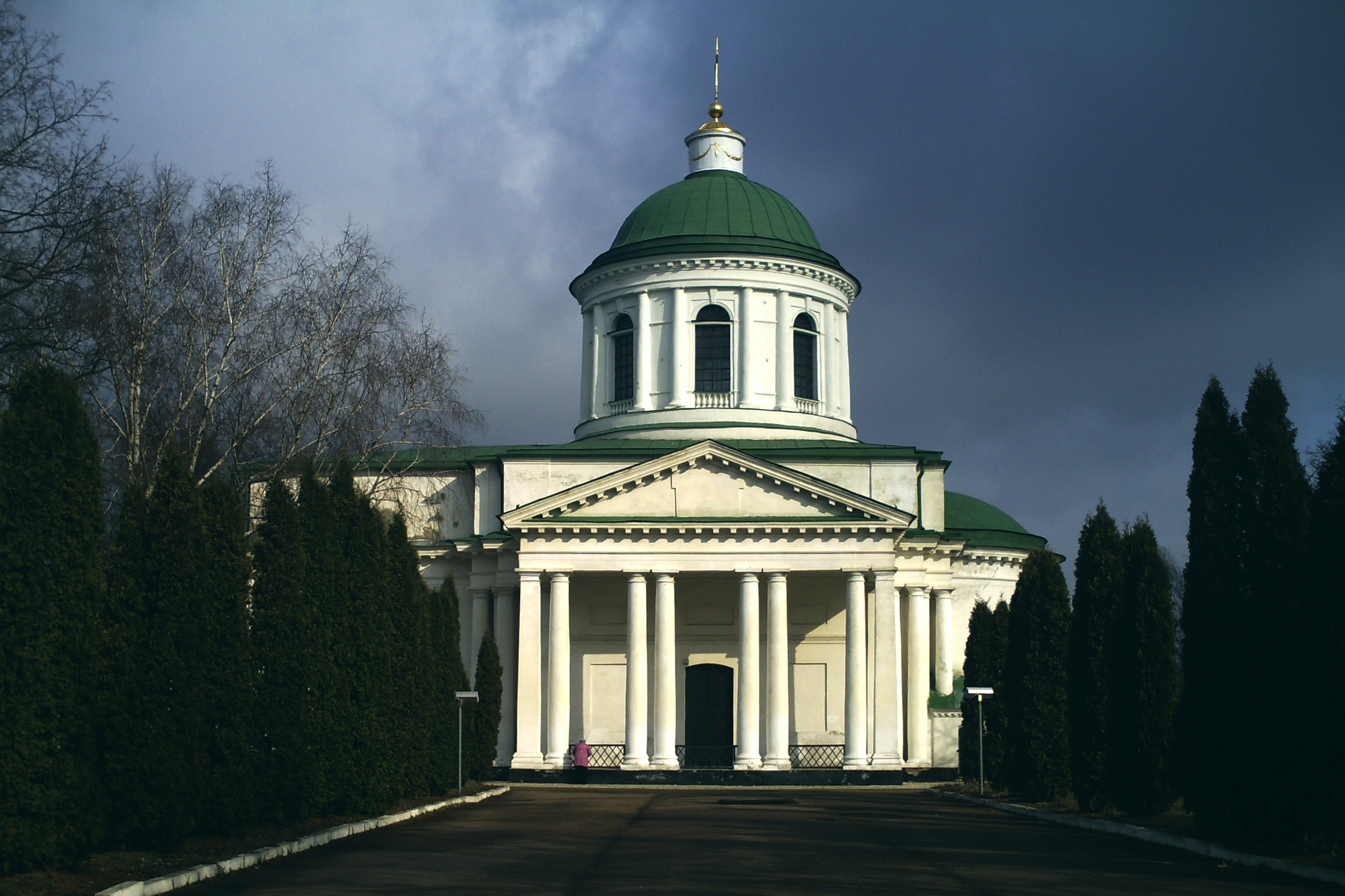
All Saints' Church

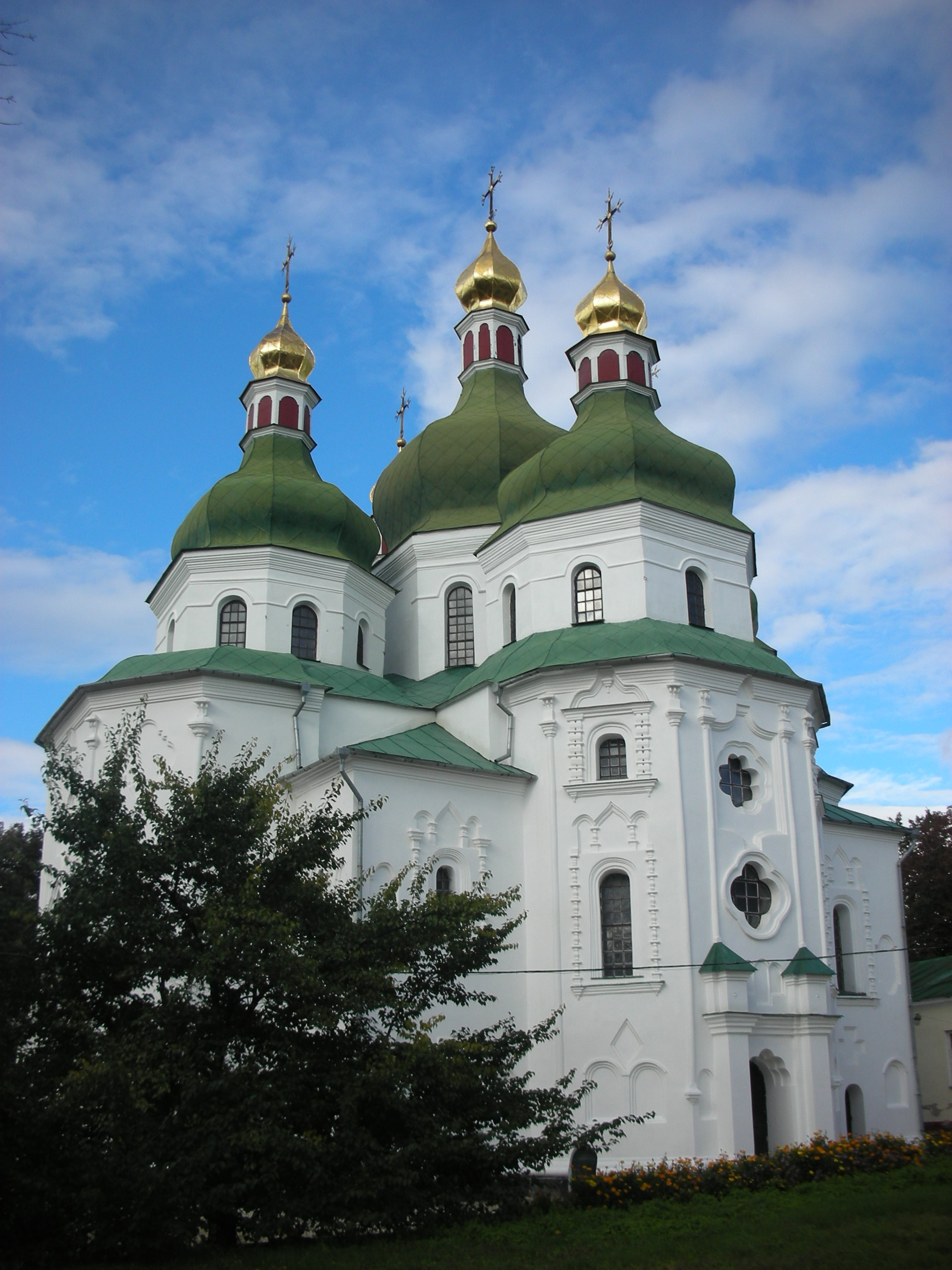
St. Nicholas Cathedral

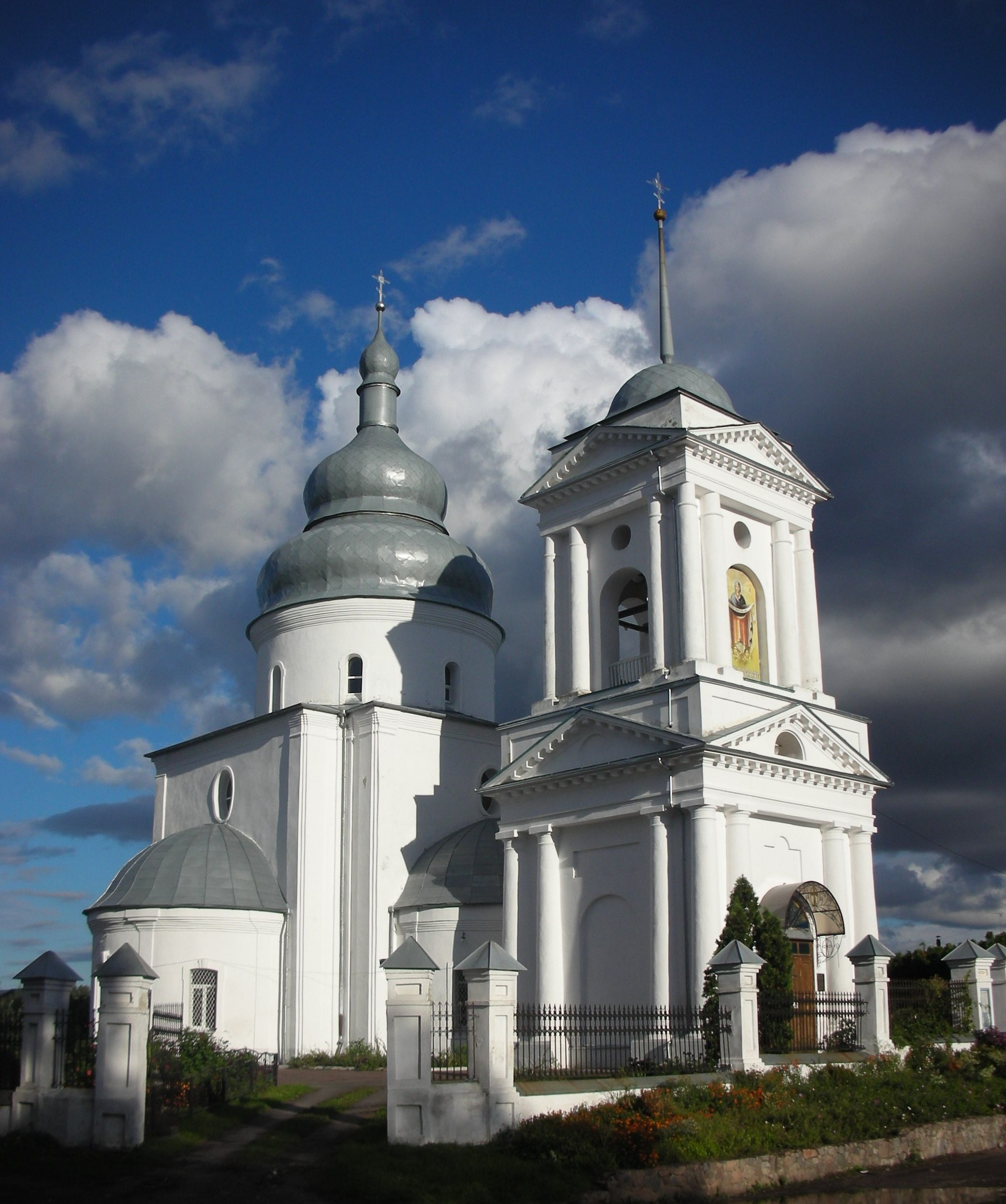
Intercession Church

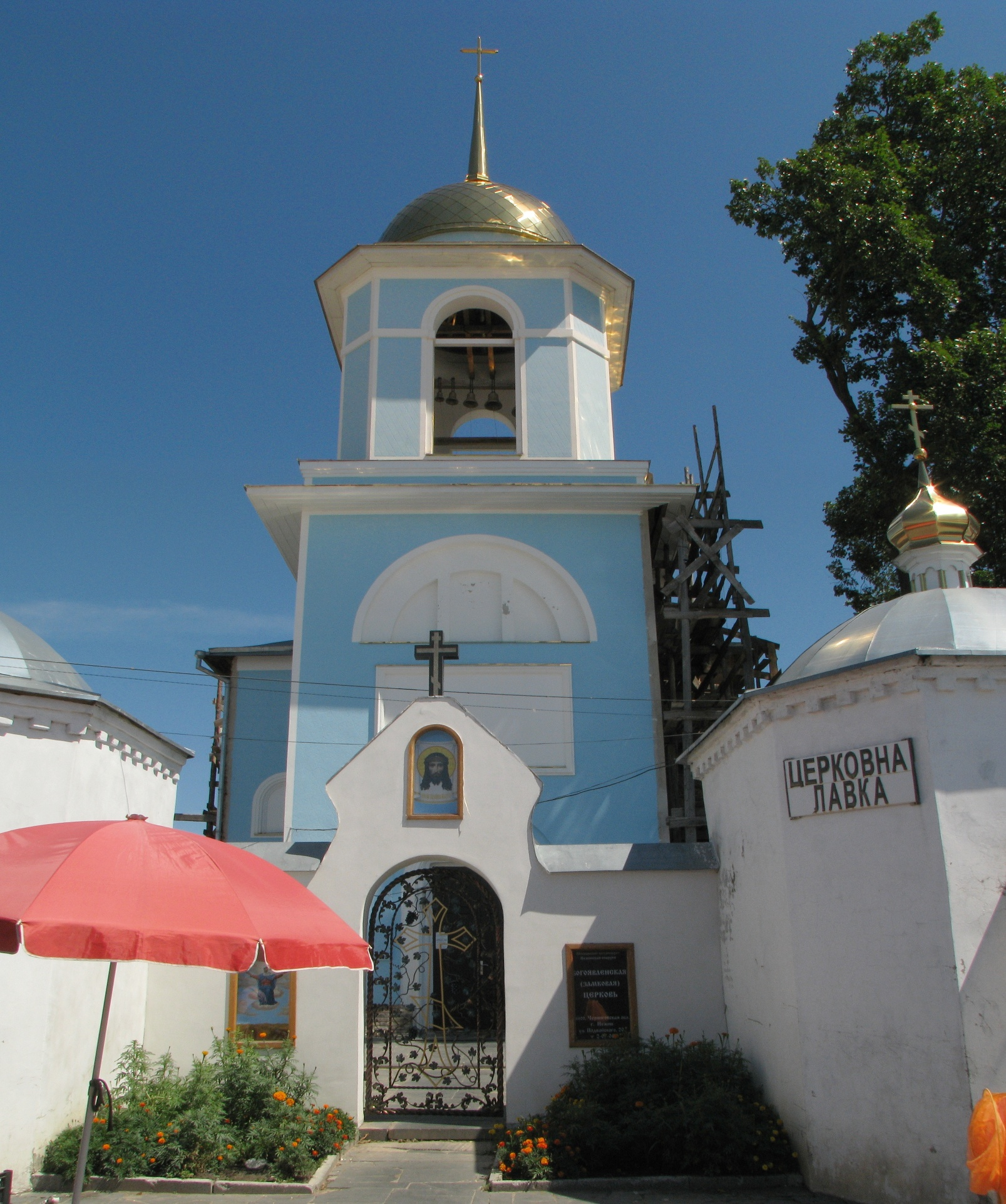
Epiphany Church

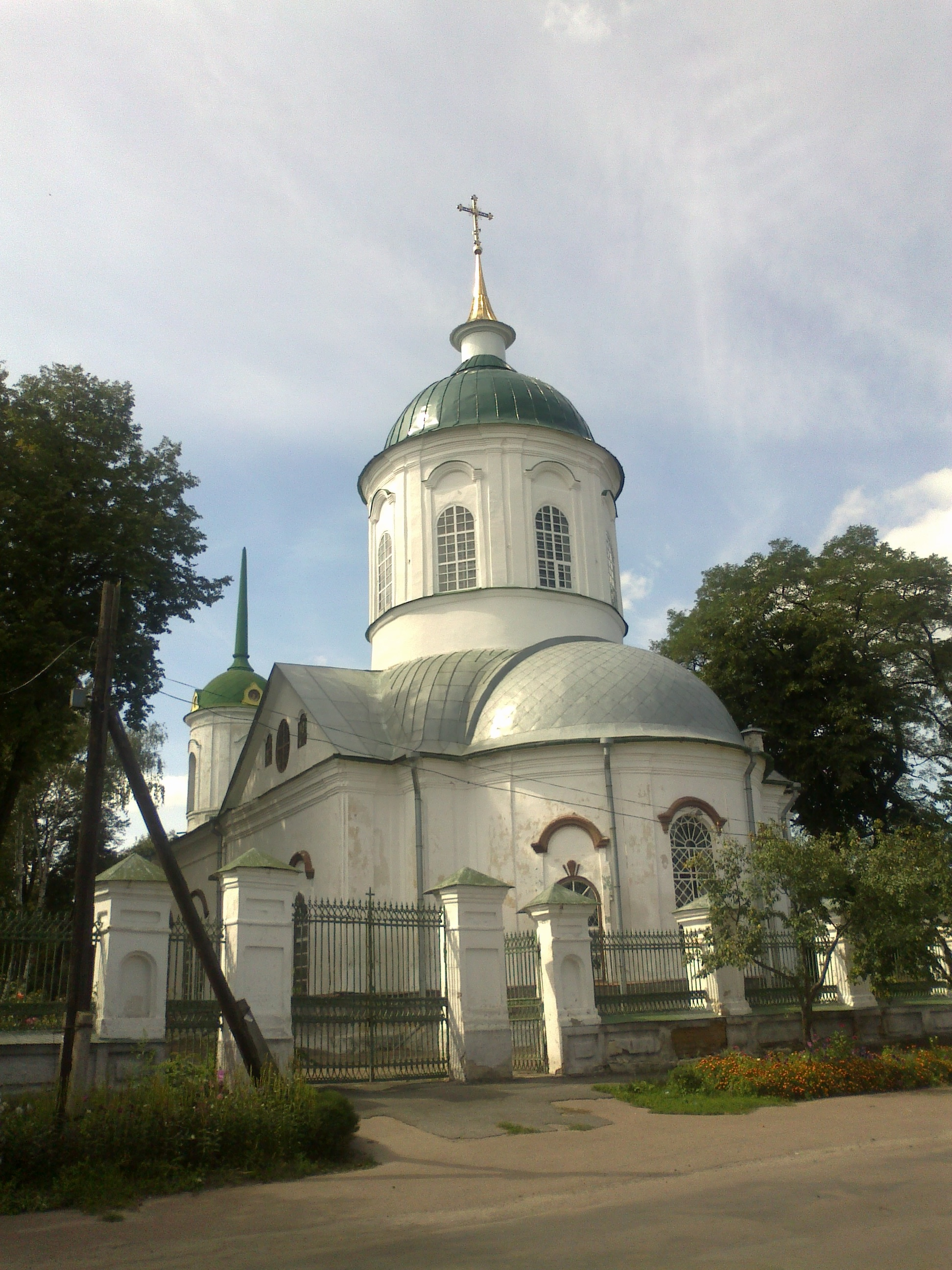
St. Basil Church

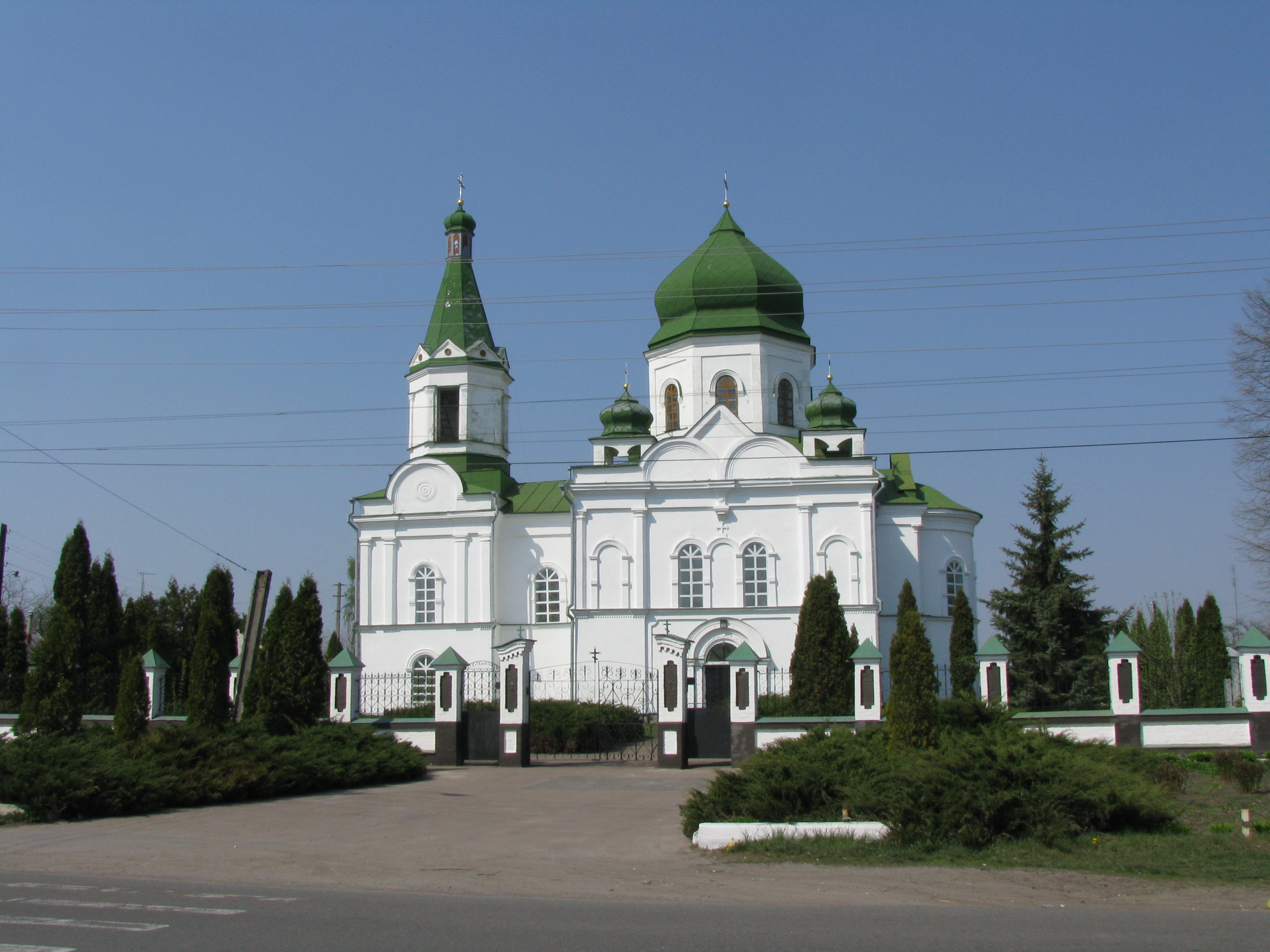
Ascension Church

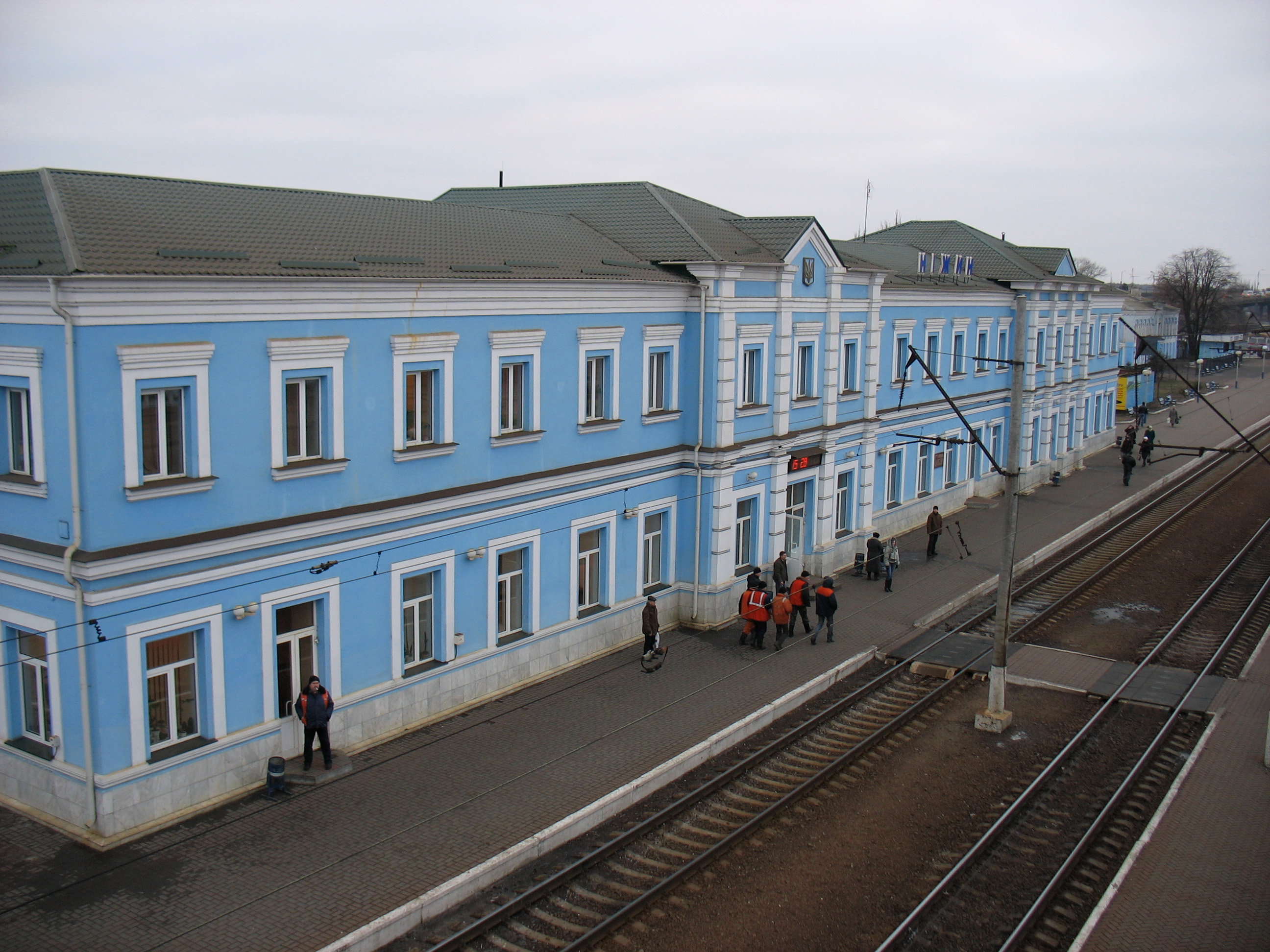
Nizhyn Railway Station

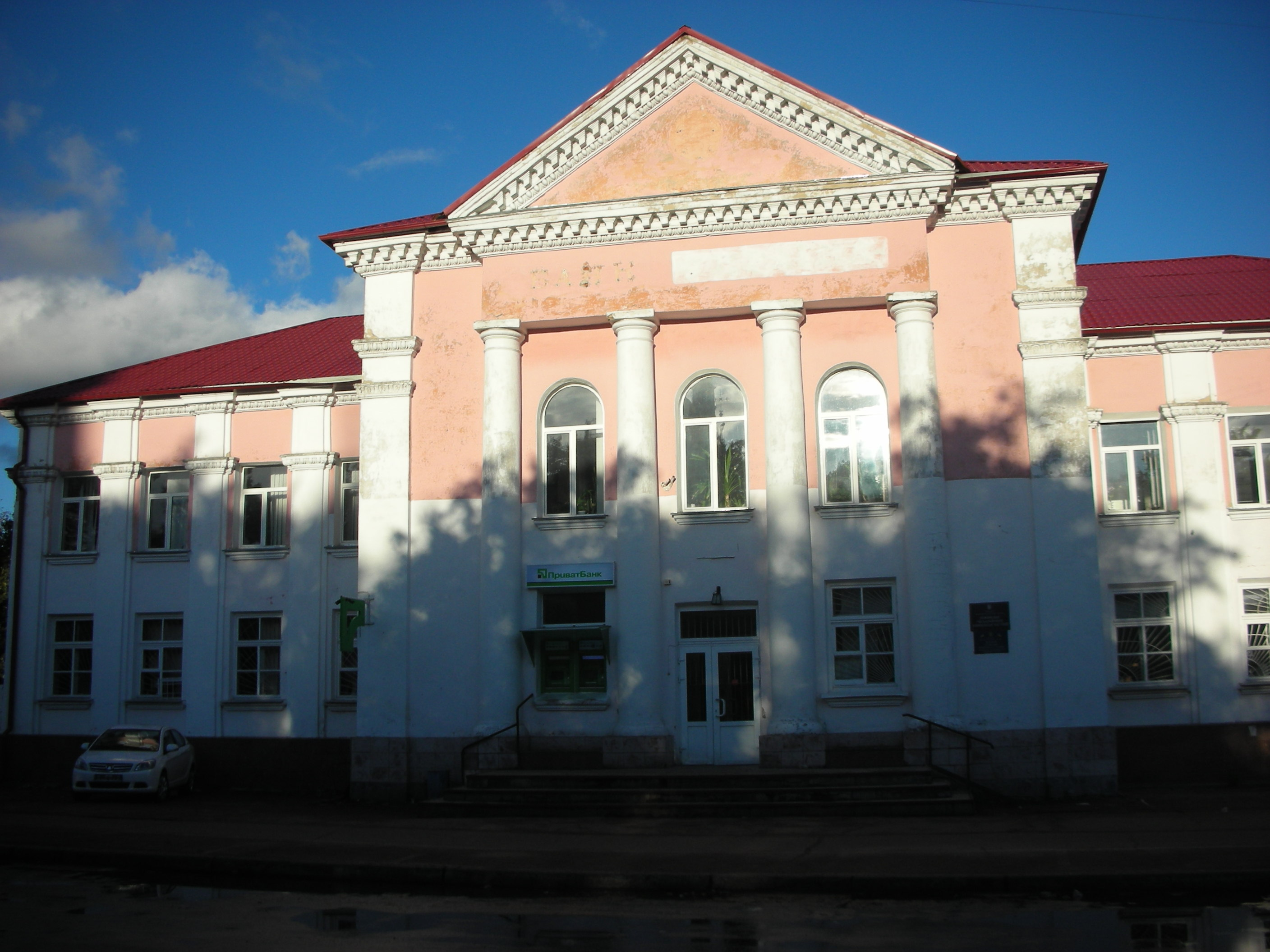
Bank building on Zankovetska Street

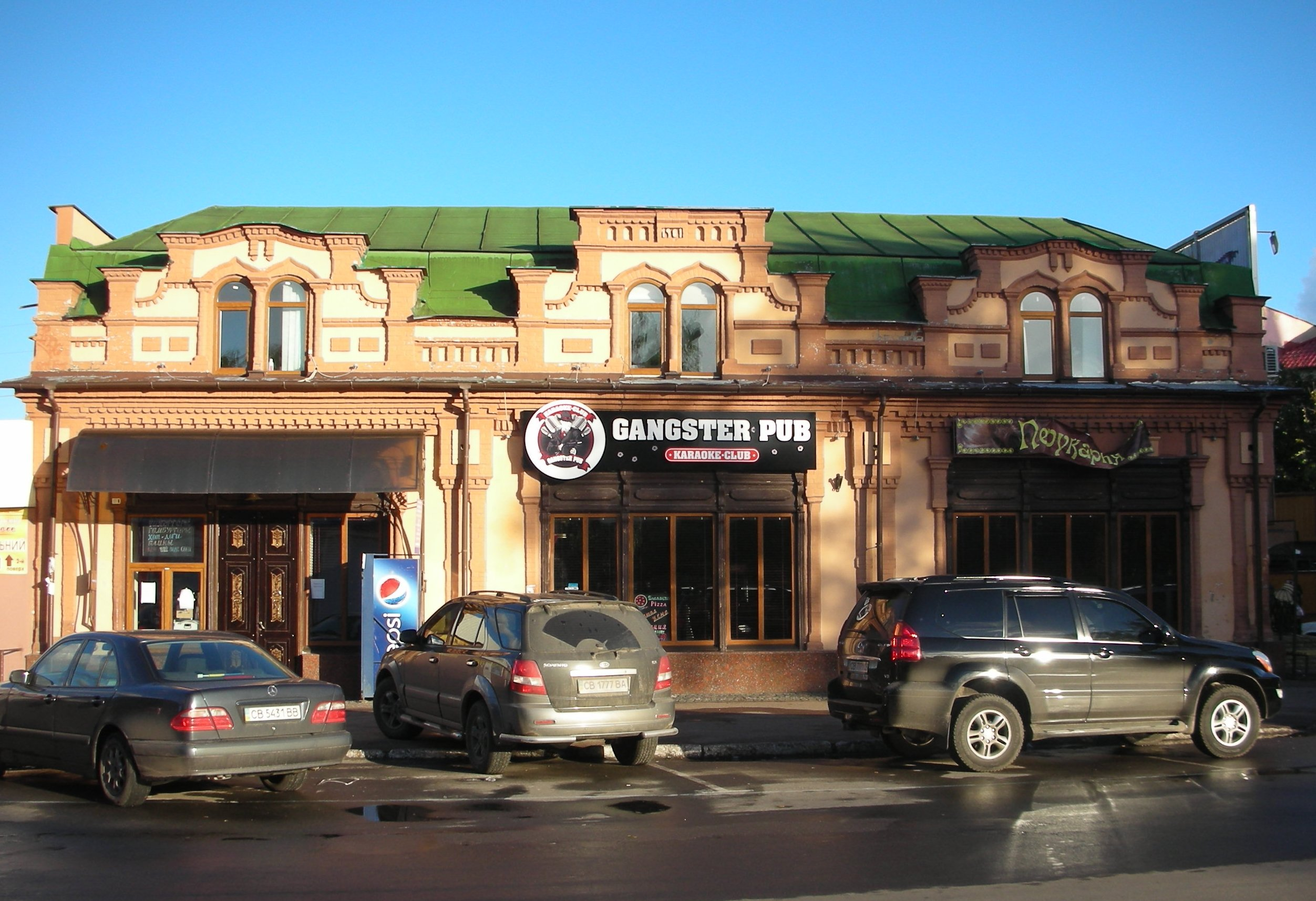
Nizhyn shopping street

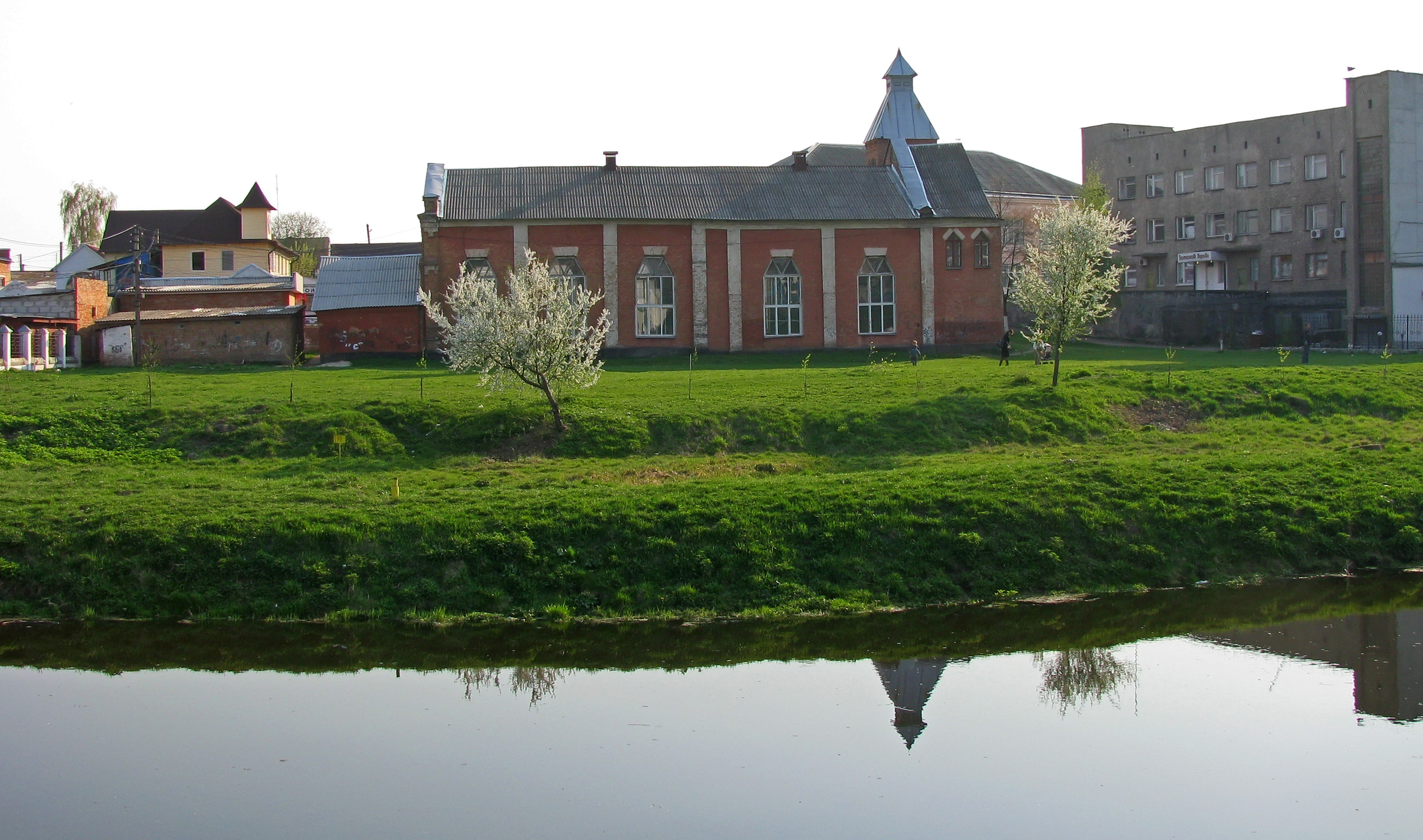
Old power station

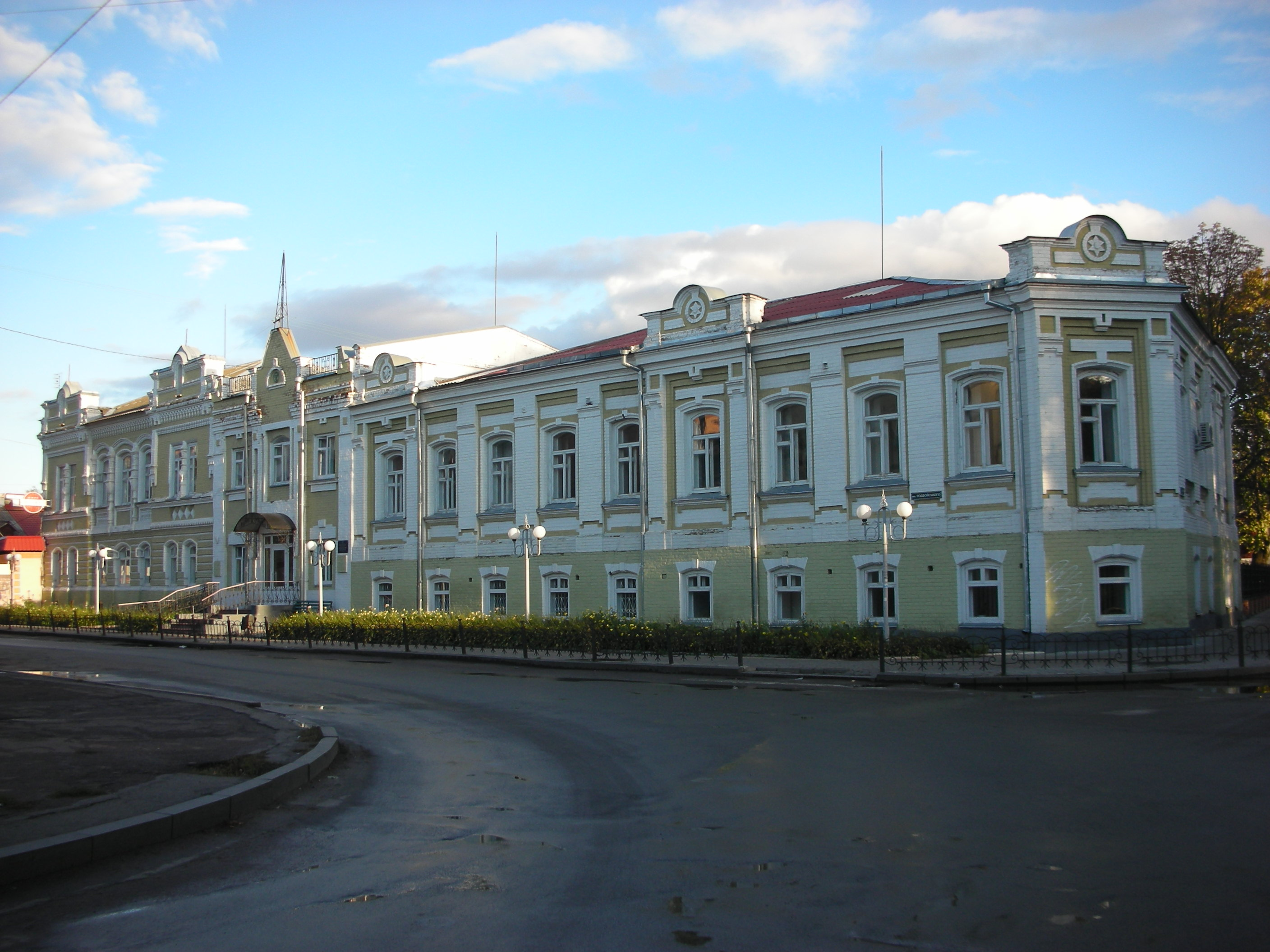
Former Jewish hotel building

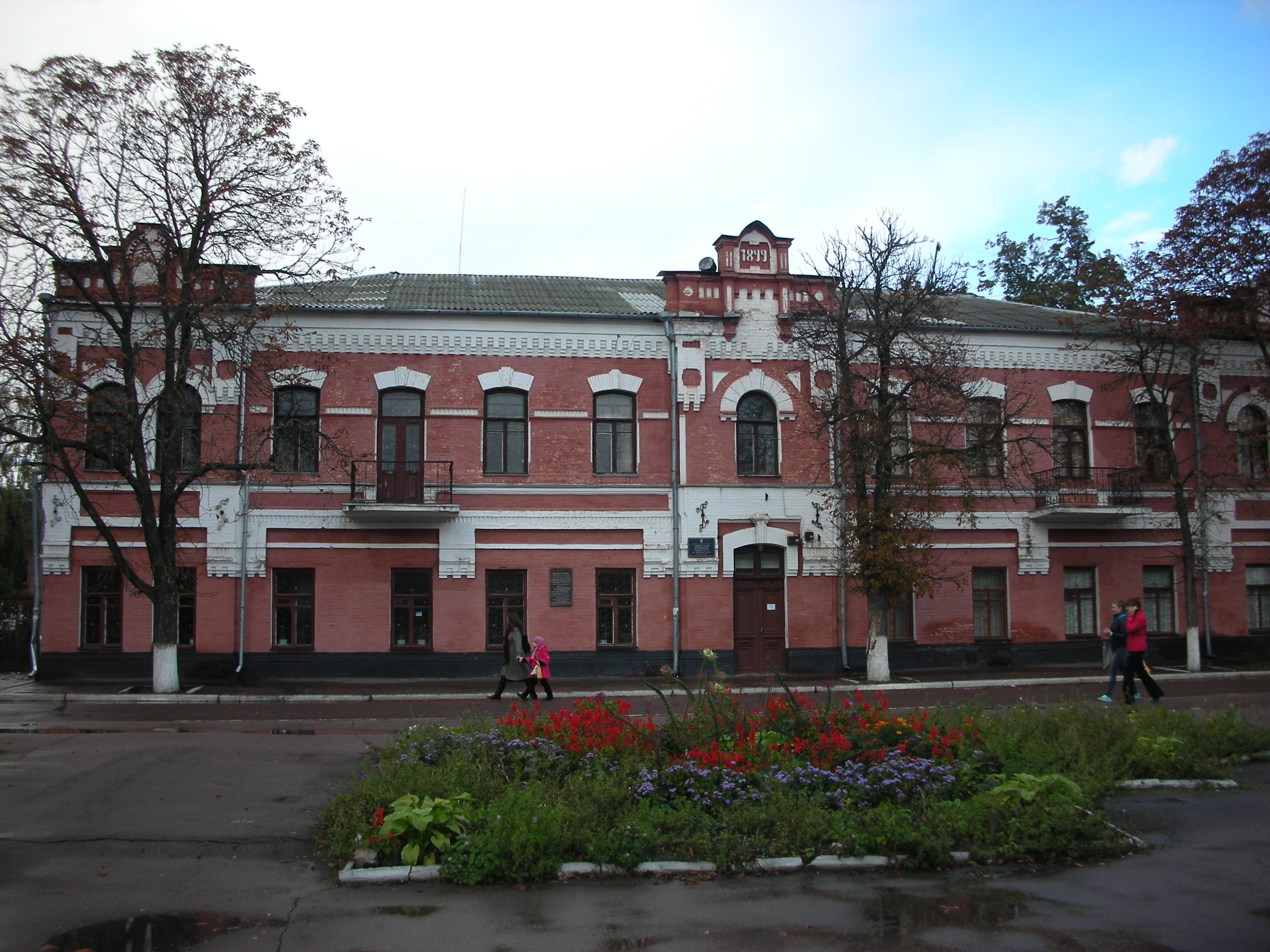
Merchant Assembly building

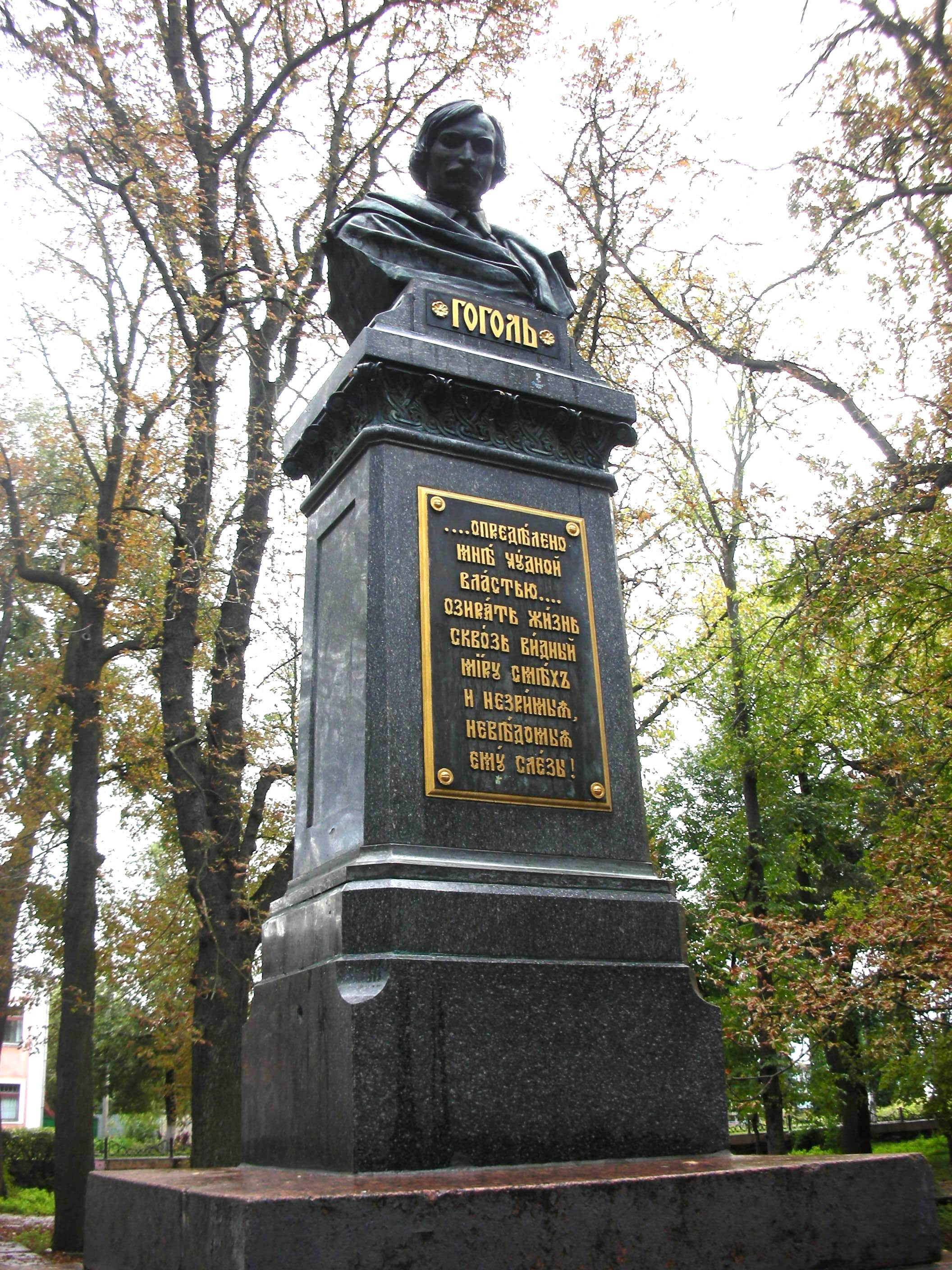
Nikolai Gogol monument

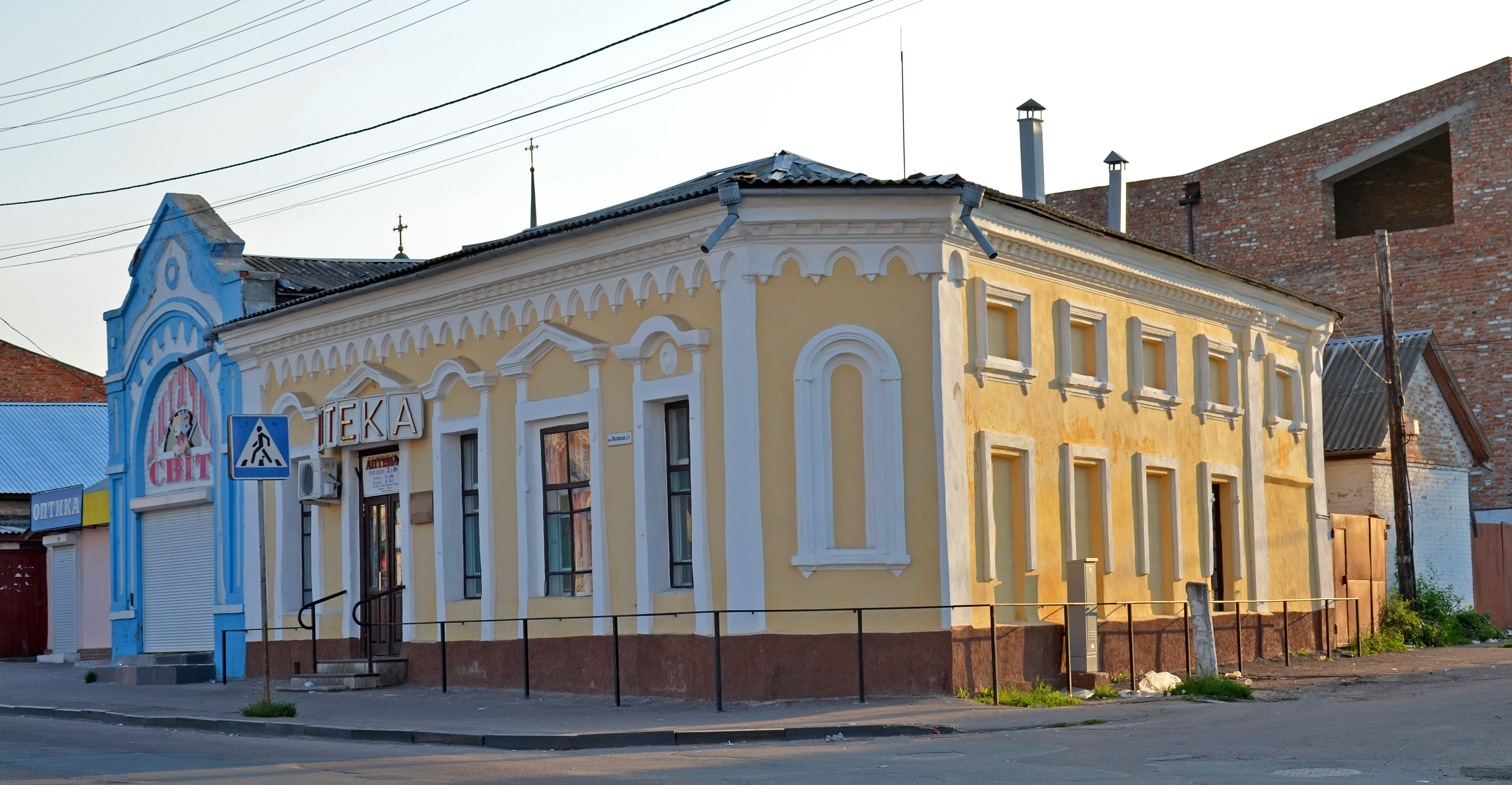
Old drugstore in Nizhyn

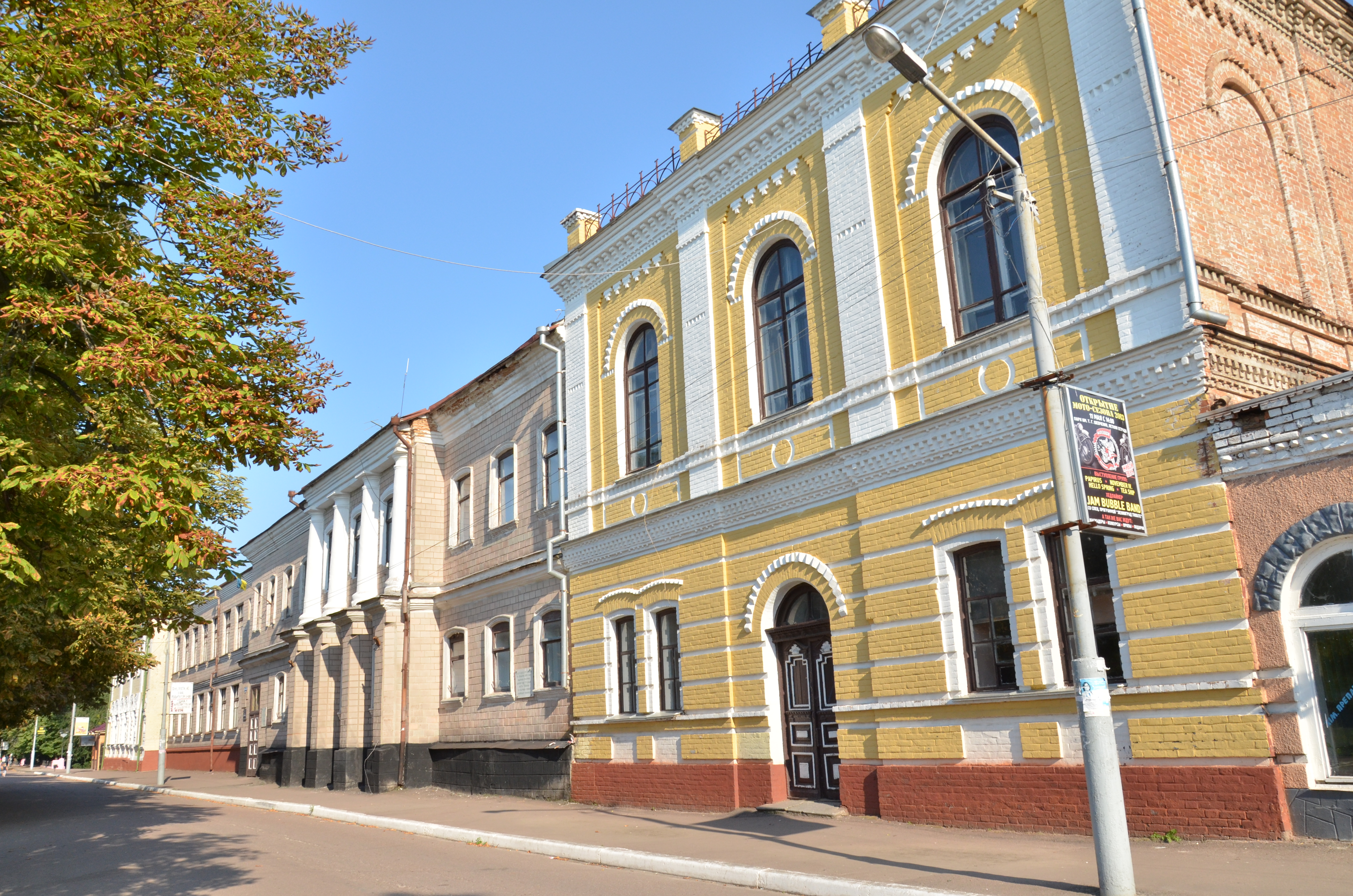
Old buildings on Hohol Street

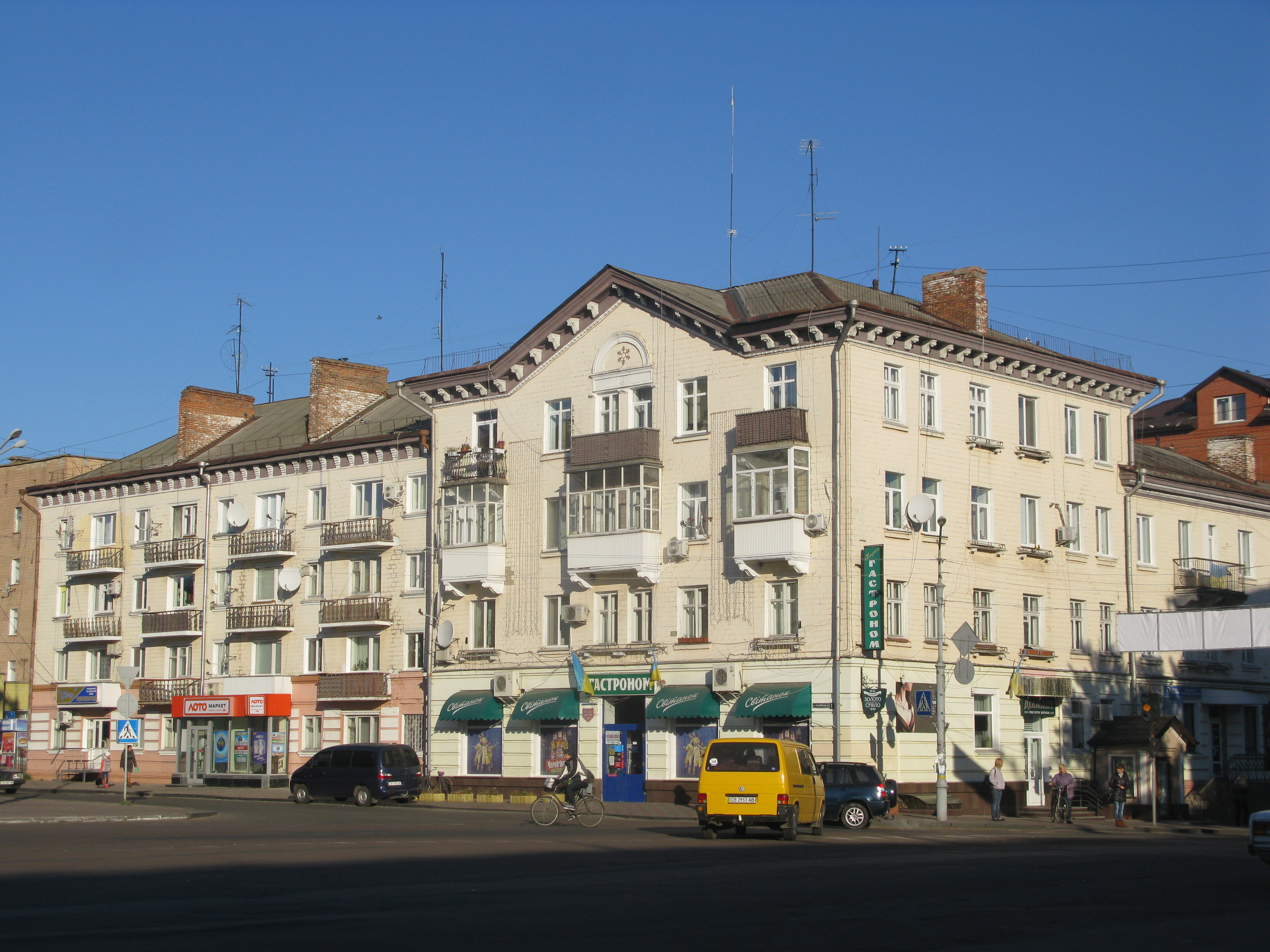
Soviet architecture in the main square

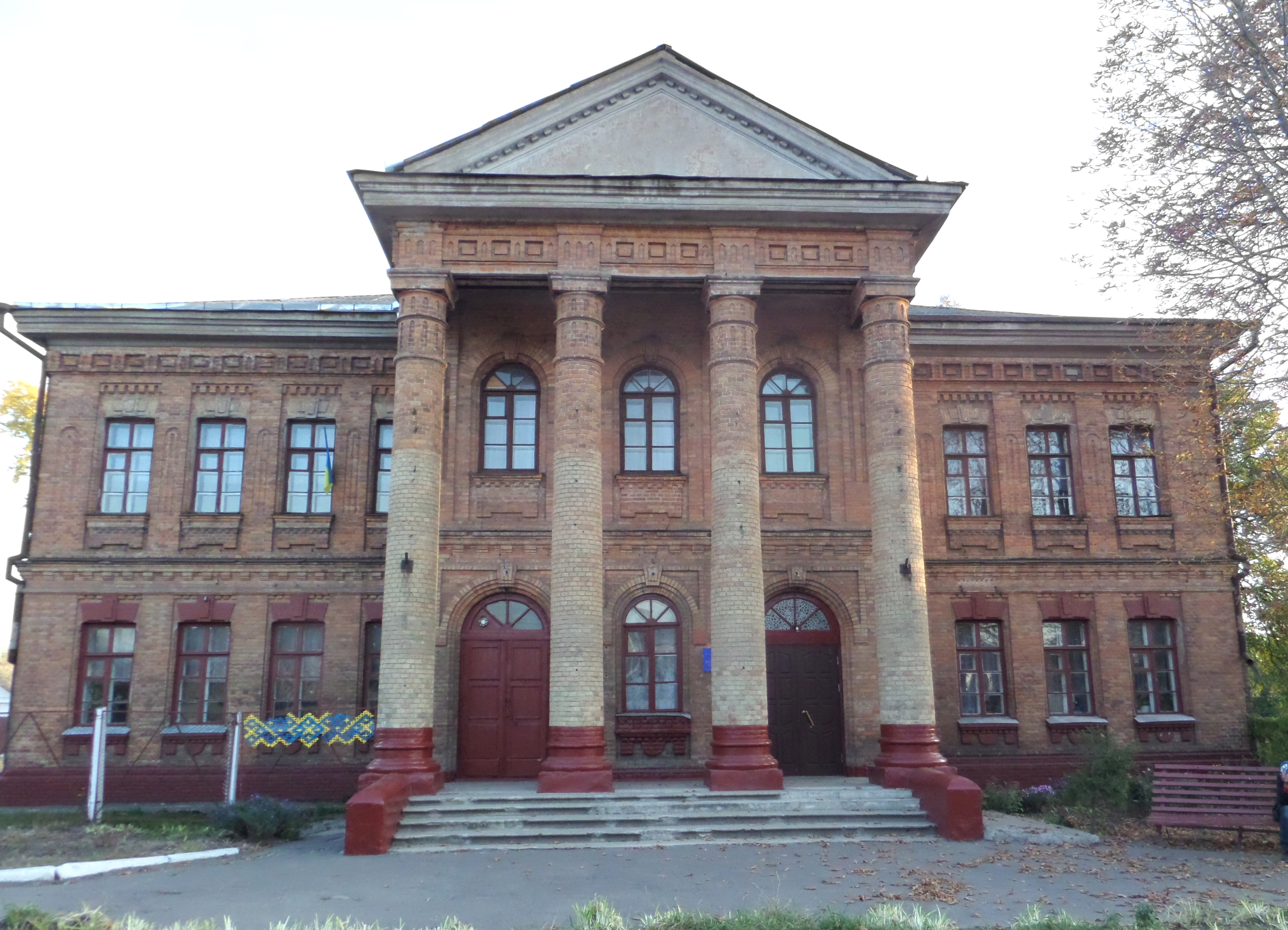
House of youth and children (former telegraph station)

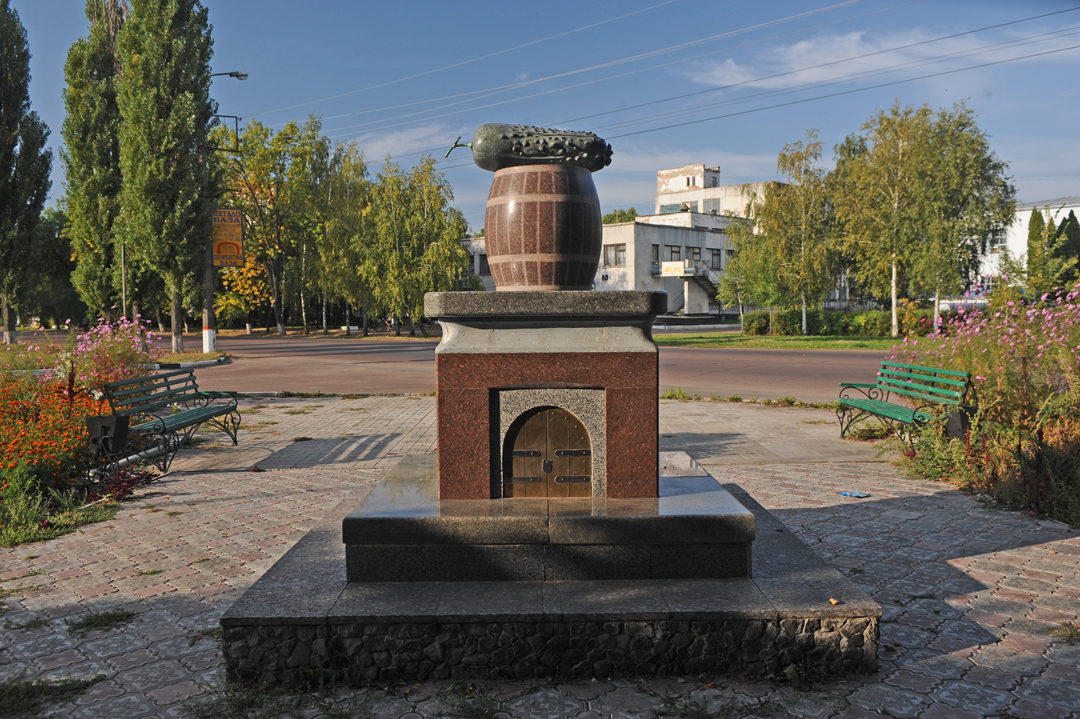
Monument to the Nizhyn cucumber

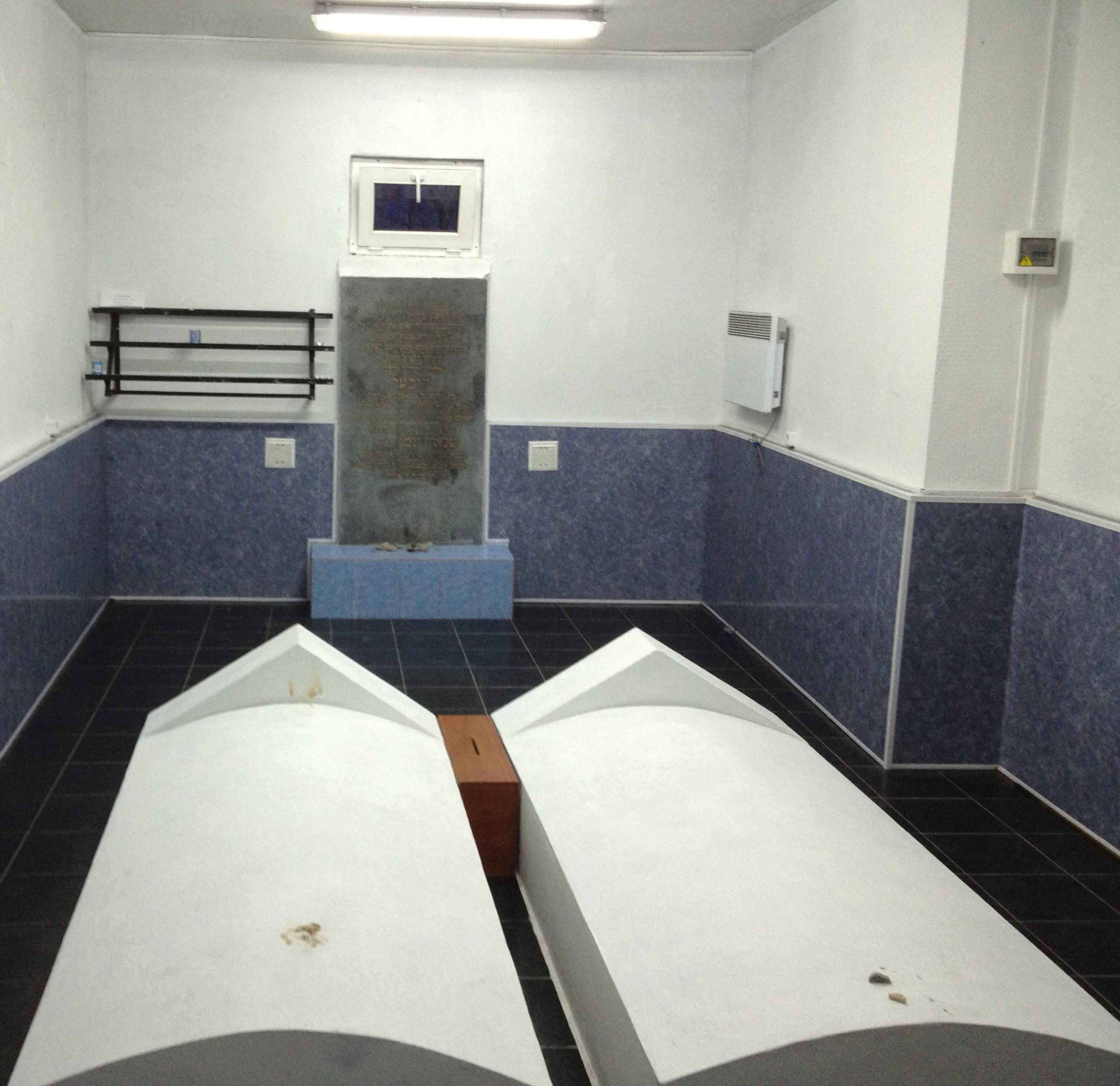
Grave of Rabbi Dovber Schneuri

== International relations ==
=== Twin towns – sister cities ===
Nizhyn is twinned with:

- Ioannina, Greece
- Preiļi, Latvia
- Świdnica, Poland
- State College, PA, United States
- Gainesville, FL, United States
- Wolfsburg, Germany
- Neustadt in Holstein, Germany
- Wachtebeke, Belgium
- Dębica, Poland
- Olkusz, Poland
- Imatra, Finland
- Winchester, United Kingdom

=== After Russian invasion in 2022 ===
Since Russia invaded Ukraine on 24 February 2022, many twin towns of Nizhyn have provided their help, support, and partnerships to aid the city's development and functioning in various fields during the state of war. Thanks to the city council's active diplomatic efforts, community initiatives, and personal connections, effective cooperation has been established with several twin towns.

Particularly close relations have been established with the United States of America. One example of a successful partnership is the official cooperation with the city of Gainesville, Florida, which arose thanks to the student-run Ukraine Rebuilding Initiative (URI) at the University of Florida and the Off the Battlefield Foundation (OBF), led by Mikhail Mikhaylov. After Mayor Oleksandr Kodola visited the US in 2023, both cities launched joint humanitarian initiatives. In particular, engineering students developed a modern prosthetic arm for a Ukrainian veteran and created an innovative bus shelter for the residents of Nizhyn. This cooperation also included help for the education of the town: the Nizhyn Lyceum started working with the University of Florida's Institute for Advanced Learning Technologies, getting the American partners interested in its STEM research.

The fruitful partnership was established with the State College in Pennsylvania. With the active participation of the local community and thanks to the work of volunteer Svitlana Budzhak-Jones, Nizhyn received constant support, including the provision of heating and hot water to one of the city's large districts during the winter. The signing of a Memorandum of Cooperation officially confirmed this initiative, making Nizhyn the first partner city of State College.

The partnership with the city of Preili in Latvia is equally important for Nizhyn. The agreement with this city was signed in August 2022. It involves exchanges in the fields of education, culture, art and sports, as well as the implementation of joint social and economic projects. The Latvian side has shown initiative and openness to long-term cooperation. Over the years of partnership, the sister city has provided Nizhyn with various equipment, vehicles for the military and the community, as well as financial assistance.

The Belgian community of Wachtebeke also provided support to Nizhyn. Following the official visit of the Nizhyn delegation in July 2022, a special charity account was created, to which the Belgians have already donated €5,000 in aid. Despite the small size of the municipality, the residents of Wachtebeke have been extremely active in sending humanitarian aid, including food, medicine, clothing, hygiene products, generators, lanterns and other necessary items.

The aid provided by German cities was extremely valuable. In Wolfsburg, where many Ukrainian women refugees live, a graduate of the Foreign Languages Faculty of Nizhyn Gogol State University has initiated a cooperation between cities. The partnership agreement was signed in November 2023. In 2025, Nizhyn received necessary equipment and vehicles for municipal institutions and military personnel as humanitarian aid. And the city of Neustadt, thanks to the connections with local authorities, provided a large amount of humanitarian aid to Nizhyn. In particular, the community received school furniture, interactive whiteboards, musical instruments, household appliances, bicycles, medical equipment, gowns, gloves, and other supplies for hospitals. In addition, in 2025, Nizhyn received important humanitarian aid, which will help to maintain the stability of the electrical energy supply during blackouts (inverters and eco-flow systems).

The Polish cities of Olkusz, Dębica, and Świdnica have become true friends to Nizhyn in its hour of need. From Olkusz, in particular, the community received generators from the Simo community organization and other important humanitarian aid. From the first days of the full-scale invasion, the residents of Olkusz provided aid, thanks to which it was possible to support the children of the Nizhyn orphanage, the elderly, the city hospital, representatives of the Nizhyn Society of People with Hearing Impairments, military personnel, as well as the population of the surrounding villages that suffered from the war. In addition, in 2025, in cooperation with Olkusz, a partnership program called "Vacation from War" was organized for active young people in Nizhyn. As a symbol of gratitude, some streets in Nizhyn were renamed in honour of the cities of Dębica and Świdnica, which have repeatedly provided support.

The cooperation with the Finnish city of Imatra, which was established through the mediation of the Ukrainian Embassy in Finland, became unique. The cooperation agreement was signed in December 2022. In early January 2023, the first cargo of generators, portable power stations, and solid fuel heaters arrived in Nizhyn, helping the community survive the winter. Every year since the beginning of the cooperation, the city has been sending various humanitarian aid to the Nizhyn community and the military personnel, including vehicles, different equipment, hygiene products, food, and communication devices. In addition, a delegation from Imatra often visits Nizhyn.

Thus, thanks to partnerships with twin towns, Nizhyn not only received vital assistance during difficult periods of war but also opened new horizons for cultural, educational, and economic development.

== Notable people ==
- Jacob Pavlovitch Adler, Jewish actor.
- Sonya Adler, one of the first women to perform in Yiddish theater in Imperial Russia.
- Ambrosius, Orthodox Metropolitan of Moscow
- Antoni Andrzejowski, Polish botanist, teacher of the Nizhyn Lyceum (1839–1856), author of the diary Wspomnienia starego detiuka.
- Abraham Berline, artist.
- Mark Bernes, a Soviet actor and singer of Jewish ancestry.
- Bohdan Biloshevskyi, footballer
- Mani Leib (Brahinsky), Yiddish poet
- Elina Bystritskaya, a Soviet film actress, People's Artist of the USSR.
- Semyon Desnitsky, a disciple of Adam Smith who introduced his ideas to the Russian public.
- Oleh Davydov, footballer
- Timofei Dokshizer, principal trumpeter and trumpet soloist of the Bolshoi Theater, of Jewish ancestry.
- Mikhail Erassi, painter
- Mykhailo Kaskevych, Ukrainian politician, Minister of Labour (1991-1996)
- Olga Khokhlova, Pablo Picasso's wife.
- George (Konissky), Eastern Orthodox archbishop
- Sergey Korolyov, the father of the Soviet space program.
- Nestor Kukolnik, a Russian playwright and prose writer.
- Yuri Lisyansky, headed the first Russian circumnavigation of the globe.
- Oleksandr Matsievskyi, Ukrainian Ground Forces member and captive executed by Russian soldiers during the Battle of Bakhmut in the Russian invasion of Ukraine.
- Kateryna Pavlenko, lead singer of the Ukrainian electro-folk band Go_A.
- Zhanna Pintusevich-Block, a world champion sprinter.
- Israel Rosenberg, founded the first Yiddish theater troupe in Imperial Russia.
- Mykola Samokysh, Ukrainian Soviet painter
- Ihor Sholin, former professional Ukrainian football player.
- Artem Sukhotskyi, footballer
- John of Tobolsk, Canonized 1916 by Russian Orthodox Church
- Maria Zankovetska, a Ukrainian theater actress, the very first recipient of People's Artist of Ukraine
