= Mikhail Erassi =

Russian painter

- Михаил Спиридонович Эрасси
- Born: December 2, 1823; Nizhyn, Chernigov Governorate, Russian Empire
- Died: January 10, 1899; Berlin, Prussia, German Empire
- Education: Imperial Academy of Arts (1852)
- Known for: landscape painting
- Style: Academism
- Elected: Member Academy of Arts (1857); Professor by rank (1862)

Mikhail Spiridonovich Erassi (Note: Russian: Михаи́л Спиридо́нович Эра́сси. A 1857 letter from Yakov Polonsky to Mariya Khalchinskaya, Frau Stackenschneider, records the surname as Gerassi (Russian: Герасси).) (2 December [O.S. 20 November] 1823 — 10 January 1899 [O.S. 29 December 1898]) was a Russian painter of Greek descent, commonly known for his landscapes, typical of the Academic style. A relative of the Romantic painter Alexey Venetsianov, Erassi was among the last students of his painting school before gaining a reputation as follower of the Swiss painter Alexandre Calame.

== Biography ==
Mikhail Erassi was born in 1828. He studied at the Imperial Academy of Arts under Professor Vorobyov. During his studies, he was awarded several prizes.

In 1853, as a pensioner of the Academy of Arts, he was sent abroad for two years, but in 1856 he applied for a postponement of his stay abroad for another two years to continue his studies under the guidance of the famous artist Alexander Calame. For his part, Kalama also asked to leave Erassi to improve his skills.

In 1857 Michail Erassi was elevated to the rank of academician and in 1862 he was elected professor of landscape painting. Erassi was strongly influenced by Kalam and had almost perfectly assimilated the techniques of the latter. His subjects were often Swiss landscapes. Three views sent by him from Switzerland to St.-Petersburg gave him the title of academician and the views of Four Forest Canton, Lake Geneva and Reichenbach Falls made him a professor at the academy.

The Emperor Alexander III Museum (now the State Russian Museum) acquired the following paintings by Erassi: "The shore of Lake Leman near Chambery", "Switzerland", "View near Vyborg, in Finland" and "Winter Landscape".

Mikhail Erassi died in Berlin, aged seventy-five, virtually obscure.

== Gallery ==
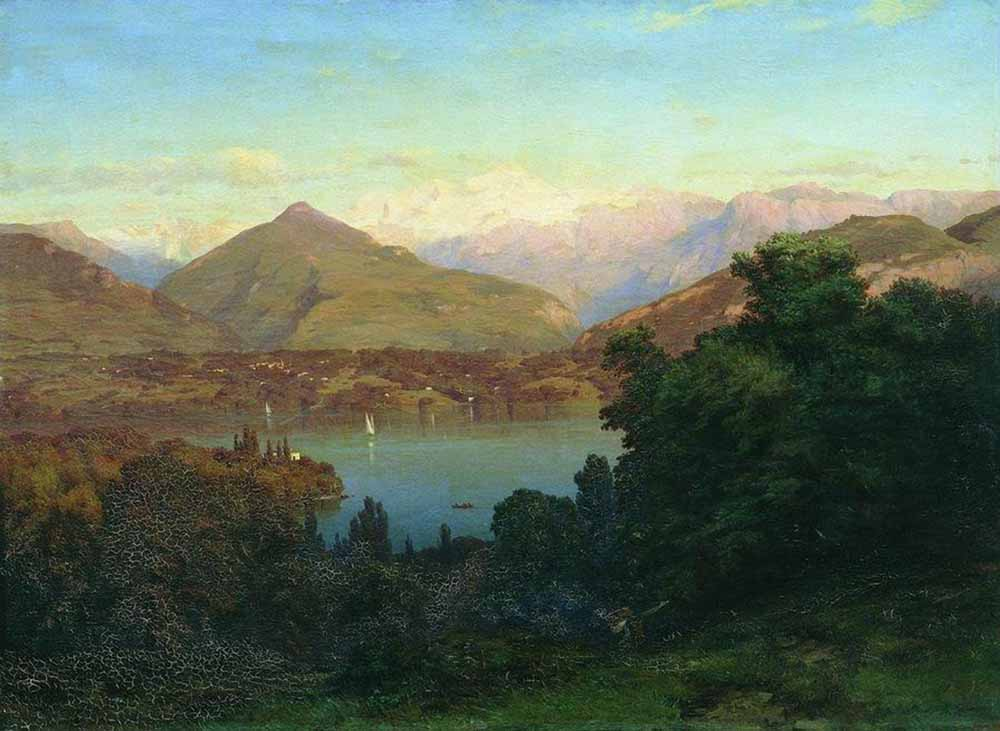
Lake Lucerne

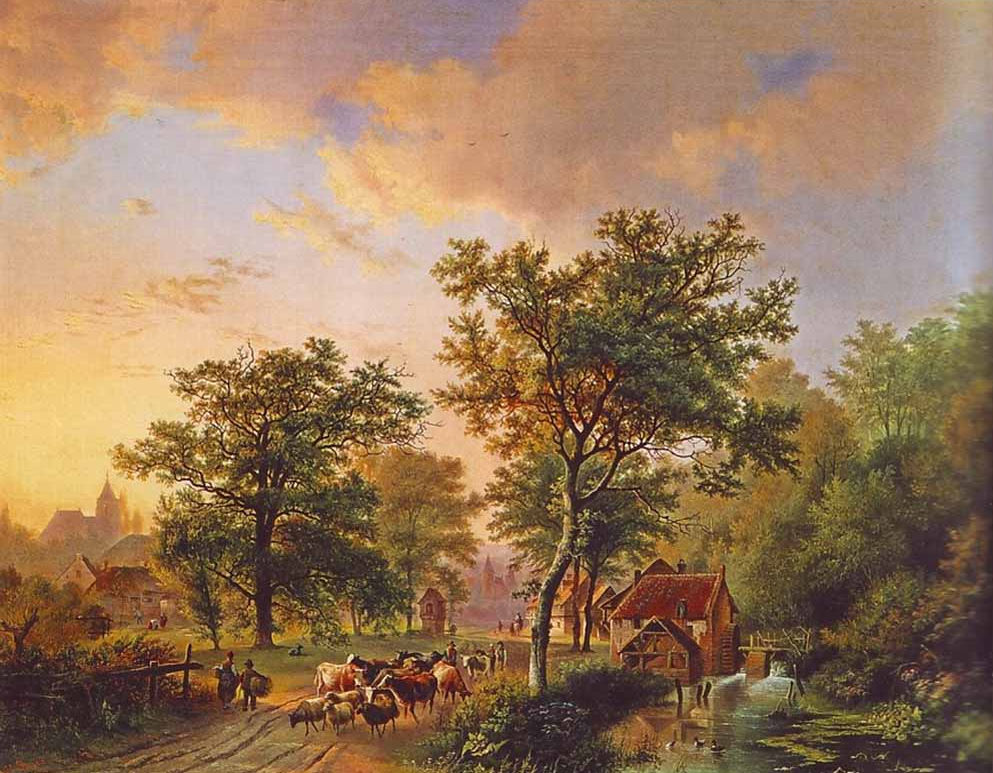
Landscape with a herd

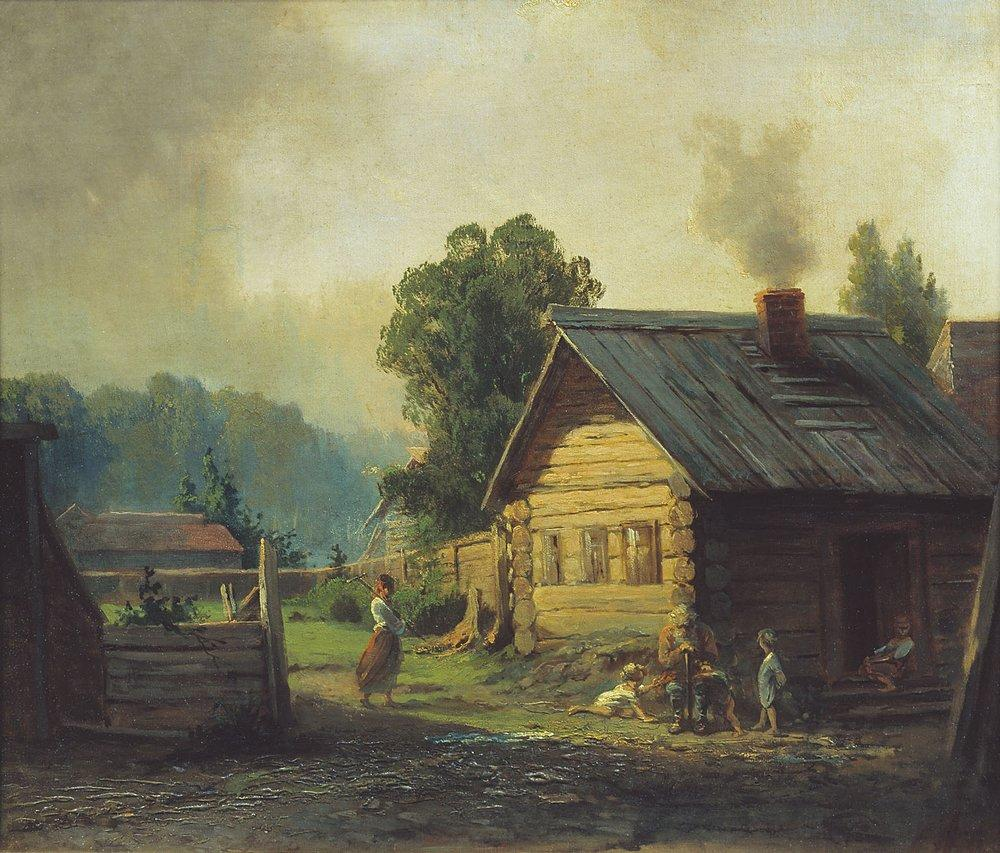
Russian village

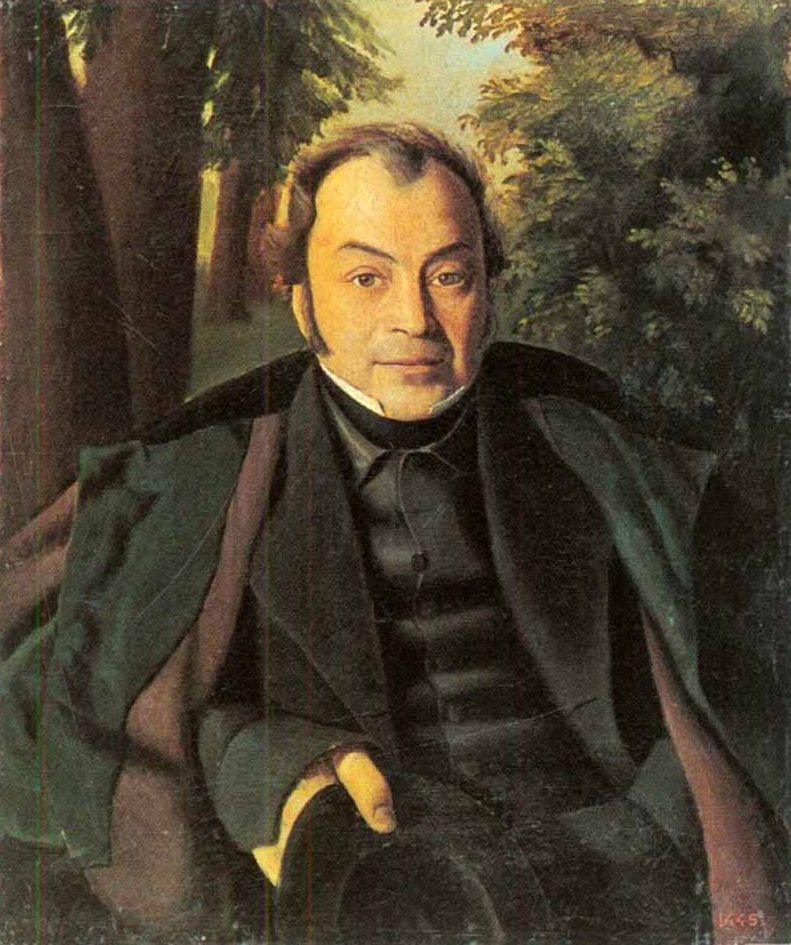
Portrait of I. V. Bobylev

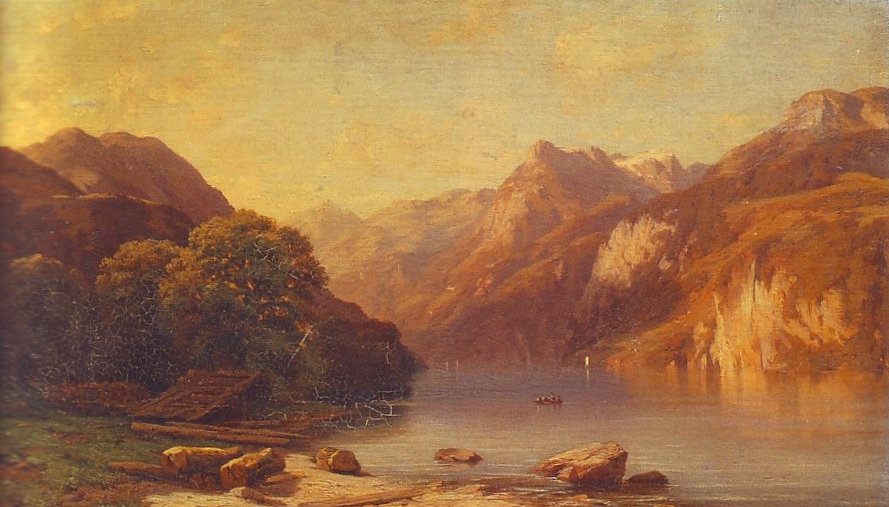
View of the lake

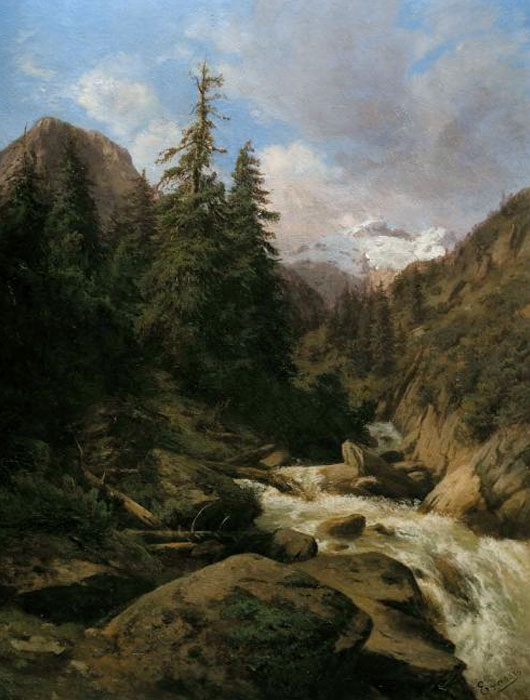
Landscape with a mountain river

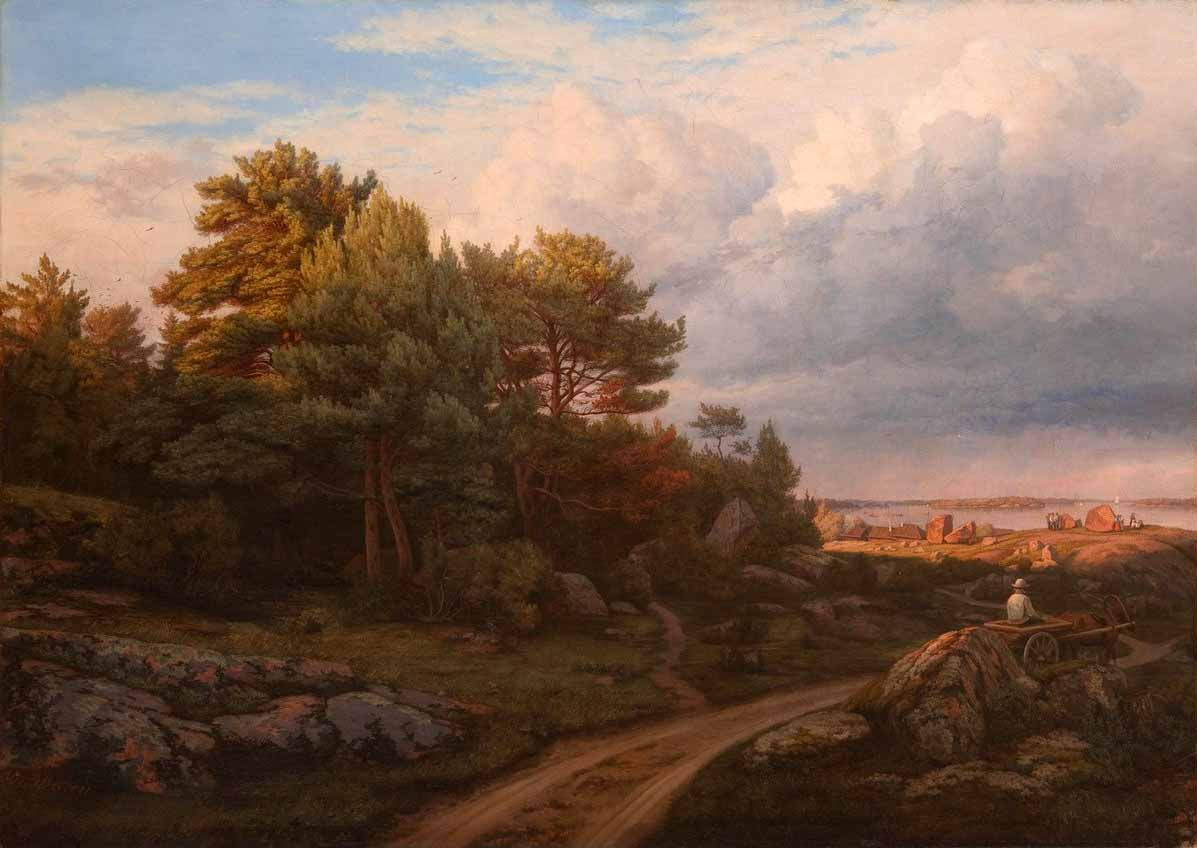
View of the surroundings of Vyborg
