= Nizhyn urban hromada =

Urban hromada of Chernihiv Oblast, Ukraine

Nizhyn urban hromada Ніжинська міська громада
- Hromada
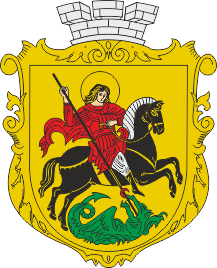
- Coat of arms
- Interactive map of Nizhyn urban hromada
- Country: Ukraine
- Oblast: Chernihiv
- Raion: Nizhyn

Area
  - Total: 130.3 km^{2} (50.3 sq mi)

Population (2023)
  - Total: 79,038
  - Density: 606.6/km^{2} (1,571/sq mi)
- Settlements: 5
- Cities: 1
- Villages: 4
- Website: nizhynrada.gov.ua

Nizhyn urban territorial hromada (Ukrainian: Ніжинська міська територіальна громада, romanized: Nizhynska miska terytorialna hromada) is one of Ukraine's hromadas, within Nizhyn Raion in Chernihiv Oblast. Its capital is the city of Nizhyn.

The hromada has a total area of 130.3 km^{2} (50.3 mi^{2}), as well as a population of 79,038 (as of 2023).

Nizhyn urban hromada was originally established as an amalgamated hromada on 19 December 2018, before being expanded to its current size in 2020 as part of decentralisation in Ukraine.

== Composition ==
In addition to one city (Nizhyn), there are four villages within the hromada:

- Kunashivka
- Naumivske
- Palyvoda
- Pereiaslivka

== See also ==
- List of hromadas of Ukraine
