= Ihor Sholin =

Ukrainian footballer

Personal information
- Full name: Ihor Mykolayovych Sholin
- Date of birth: 4 June 1985 (age 41)
- Place of birth: Nizhyn, Chernihiv Oblast, Ukrainian SSR, Soviet Union
- Date of death: 16 December 2009 (aged 24)
- Place of death: Khmelnytskyi, Ukraine
- Height: 1.79 m (5 ft 10 1/2 in)
- Position: Midfielder

Youth career
- 1998–1999 1999–2002: FC Yunist Chernihiv; RVUFK Kyiv

Senior career*
Years	Team	Apps	(Gls)
2003	FC Nizhyn	?	(?)
2004	FC Nistru Otaci	?	(?)
2005	FC Karpaty Lviv	1	(0)
2006	FC Nafkom Brovary	12	(0)
2006–2007	FC Dacia Chişinău	10	(0)
2007	FC Nizhyn	?	(?)
2008–2009	FC Dynamo Khmelnytskyi	23	(0)
- * Club domestic league appearances and goals

Ihor Sholin (Ukrainian: Ігор Миколайович Шолін; 4 June 1985 – 16 December 2009) was a professional Ukrainian football midfielder.

== Career ==
He played for FC Nizhyn, FC Nistru Otaci, FC Karpaty Lviv, FC Nafkom Brovary, FC Dacia Chişinău and FC Dynamo Khmelnytskyi.

18 July 2009 had an accident. At 12.10 on the highway Stryi – Znamianka near the village of Verbka, the bus "LAZ" with team of FC Dynamo Khmelnytskyi was driving in the direction of Vinnytsia at the cup match against FC Irpin Horenychi. At this time heading in the opposite direction the car "Gazel", which inexplicably went into the oncoming lane and crashed into a bus. The accident injured three passengers buses – Andriy Lemishevskyi, Serhiy Yakubovskyi and Ihor Sholin all of them were taken to the Khmelnytsky Regional Hospital. Yakubovskyi and Lemishevskyi came to their senses and Sholin nearly six months, fell into a coma.

16 December 2009 in Khmelnytsky Oblast Clinical Hospital Ihor's heart stopped. 17 December held a farewell to the stadium Sholin "Podillya". He was buried in his hometown Nizhyn.
