= Shmendrik =

Yiddish word for a clueless person

Shmendrik (Yiddish: שמענדריק), also rendered as schmendrick or shmendrick is a Yiddish word meaning a stupid person or a little hapless jerk ("a pathetic sad sack"). Its origin is the name of a clueless mama's boy played by Sigmund Mogulesko in Abraham Goldfaden's 1877 comedy Shmendrik, oder di komishe Chaseneh (Schmendrik or The Comical Wedding) . The play was inspired by a sketch Mogulesko performed at an audition before Goldfaden. Since then the word has often been used as a name in works of Jewish humor.

The Joys of Yiddish lexicon stresses the meagerness of "shmendrik" compared to other Jewish schm-words for luckless persons: "A shmendrik is a small, short, weak, thin, a young nebekh". This is directly opposite to mentsh (more commonly spelled "mensch") which means a "real" man of upstanding character.

== Notable usages ==
- Shmendrik, oder di komishe Chaseneh, original usage
- Shmendrick is a "wise Man of Chelm" in the 1999 Canadian animated comedy Village of Idiots
- Schmendrick the Magician, wizard from the fantasy novel The Last Unicorn, which was made into an animated film and had a sequel, Two Hearts. The author, Peter S. Beagle, said he took the name from the Yiddish term, which he described as "somebody out of his depth, the boy sent to do a man's job, someone who has expanded to the limits of his incapacity".
- Shosshi Schmendrik is a socially awkward, shy carpenter in the 1899 play Children of the Ghetto

== See also ==
- Schlemiel and Shlimazl
- Schmuck
