= List of English words of Yiddish origin =

This is a list of words that have entered the English language from the Yiddish language, many of them by way of American English. There are differing approaches to the romanization of Yiddish orthography (which uses the Hebrew alphabet); thus, the spelling of some of the words in this list may be variable (for example, shlep is a variant of schlep, and shnozz, schnoz).

== Background ==
Yiddish is a Germanic language, originally spoken by Jews in Central and later Eastern Europe, written in the Hebrew alphabet, and containing a substantial substratum of Hebrew words as well as numerous loans from Slavic languages. For that reason, some of the words listed originated in Hebrew or Slavic languages, but have entered English via Yiddish.

Yiddish is closely related to modern German, and many Yiddish words have German cognates; in some cases it is difficult to tell whether a particular word was borrowed from Yiddish or from German. Yiddish is written in the Hebrew alphabet, and Yiddish words may be transliterated into Latin spelling in a variety of ways; the transliterated spelling of Yiddish words and the conventional spelling of German are usually different, but the pronunciations are frequently the same (e.g., שוואַרץ, shvarts in Yiddish is pronounced the same way as schwarz in German).

== List of words ==
These English words of Yiddish origin, except as noted, are in the online editions of the Oxford English Dictionary (OED), The American Heritage Dictionary of the English Language (AHD), or the Merriam-Webster dictionary (MW). The parentheses-enclosed information at the end of each word's entry starts with the original Yiddish term in Hebrew script, the Latin script transliteration, and the literal English translation (if different from the English definition given earlier). This may be followed by additional relevant languages (mostly Hebrew and German). One or more dictionary references appear at the end.

=== A ===
- Alter kacker or alte kacker (Yid. אַלטער קאַקער): literally "old crapper". Sometimes abbreviated as AK or A.K.; equivalent to English "old fart".

=== B ===
- Bagel: A ring-shaped bread roll made by boiling or steaming, and then baking, the dough (from Yiddish: בײגל, romanized: beygl, from Old High German boug with diminutive -el suffix).
- Balabusta, balabosta, balebosta (Yid. בעל־הביתטע): a Jewish mistress of the house; usually applied with positive connotations.
- Blintz: A sweet cheese-filled crepe (בלינצע, blintse, from Belarusian: блінцы, romanized: blincy, lit. 'pancakes' (plural)).
- Bris: The circumcision of a male child. (ברית, bris, from Hebrew: ברית, romanized: brith, lit. 'covenant').
- Broigus (Yid. ברוגז broygez): (n) a bitter feud of anger; (adj.) angry, irritated; from Hebrew ברוגז (berogez, "angry").
- Boychik: Boy, young man. (English boy + Eastern Yiddish: טשיק, -chik, diminutive suffix (from Slavic).
- Bubbeh, bubbe (Yid. באָבע): grandmother; elderly woman.
- Bubbeleh (Yid. באָבעלע): a term of endearment; esp. for a young child or elderly relative.
- Bupkis (also Bupkes, Bupkus, Bubkis, Bubkes): Emphatically nothing, as in 'He isn't worth bupkis' (באָבקעס, bobkes; of uncertain origin; perhaps originally meaning '[goat] droppings', from a word meaning 'beans', of Slavic origin)

=== C ===
- Cholent, cholnt, tcholent, etc. (Yid. טשאָלנט tsholnt): traditional slow-simmering Sabbath stew prepared overnight.
- Chutzpah /ˈxʊtspə/: Nerve, gall, guts, balls, daring, self-confidence, audacity, effrontery (חצפּה, khutspe, from Hebrew).

=== D ===
- Daven: To recite Jewish liturgical prayers (דאַוונען, davnen).
- Dreck, drek: Worthless, distasteful, or nonsensical material (דרעק, drek, from Middle High German: drec, lit. 'rubbish'; cognate with German: Dreck, 'dirt, filth').
- Dybbuk: The malevolent spirit of a dead person that enters and controls a living body until exorcised (דבּוק, dibbuk, 'a latching-onto').
- Dreidel: Yiddish: דרײדל, romanized: dreydl, a four-sided spinning top.

=== F ===
- Fleishig: Made with meat or poultry (פֿליישיק, fleyshik, 'meaty', from fleysh, 'meat'; cf. German: fleischig, 'meaty'). It is usually used to denote a class of kosher products.
- Frum (Yid. פֿרום): adjective; religious, observant of Judaism laws (cf. German "Fromm" = pious).

=== G ===
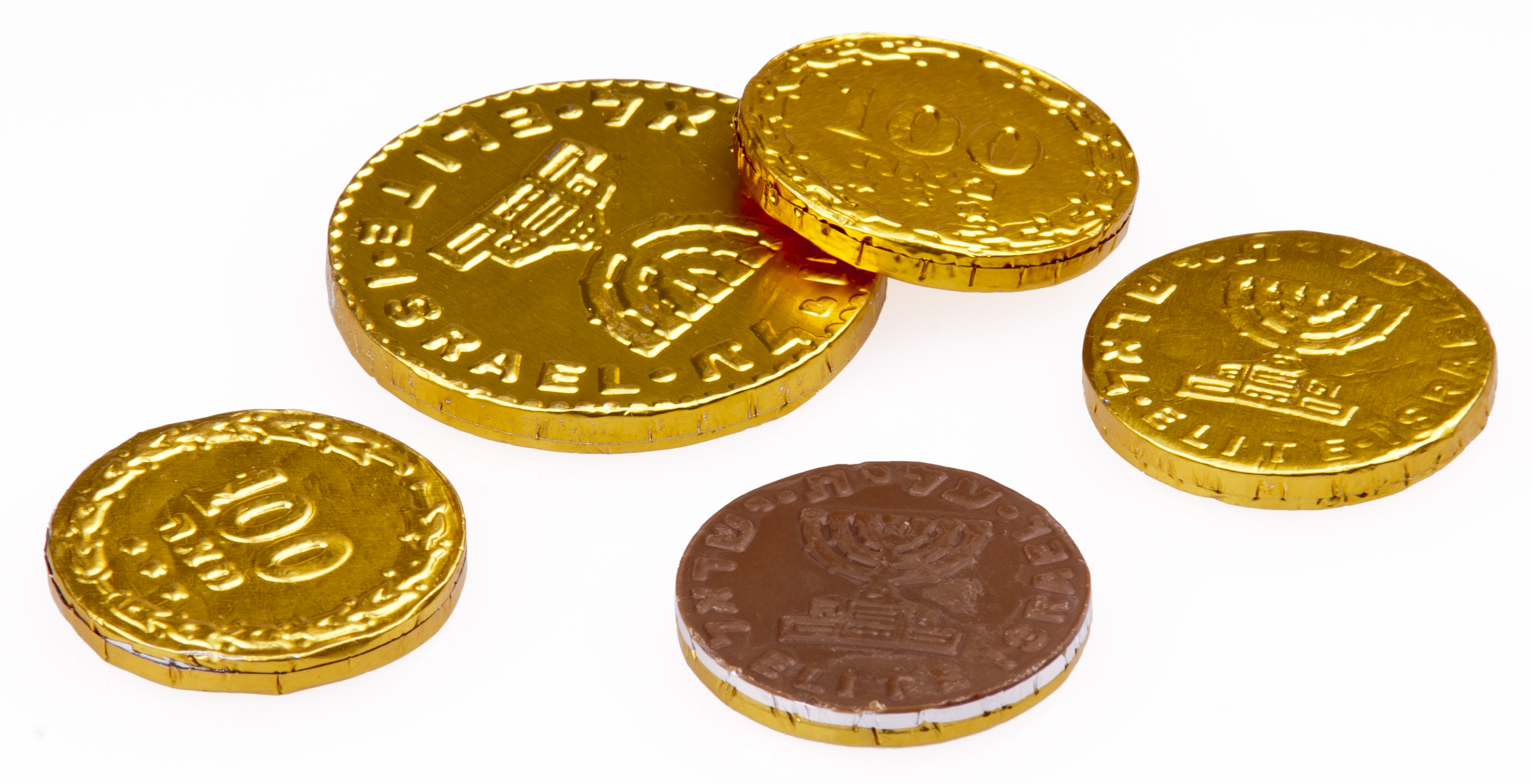
Gelt

- Ganef or Gonif: A thief, scoundrel, rascal (גנבֿ, ganev/ganef, 'thief', from Hebrew: גנב, gannav).
- Gelt /ɡɛlt/: Money in general; also the chocolate coins given to children on Hanukkah (געלט, gelt, 'money'; cognate with German: Geld, 'money'; related to 'gold').
- Glitch: A minor malfunction (גליטש, glitsh, from גליטשן, glitshn, 'slide'; cf. German: glitschen, 'slither').
- Golem: A man-made humanoid; an android, Frankenstein monster (גלם, goylem, from Hebrew: גלם, gōlem).
- Goy: A gentile, term for someone not of the Jewish faith or people (גוי; plural גויים or גוים, goyim; from Hebrew: גויים or גוים, goyim, 'nations', plural of גוי, goy, 'nation').

=== H ===
- Haimish (also Heimish) /ˈheɪmɪʃ/: Home-like, friendly, folksy (היימיש, heymish; cf. German: heimisch).

=== K ===
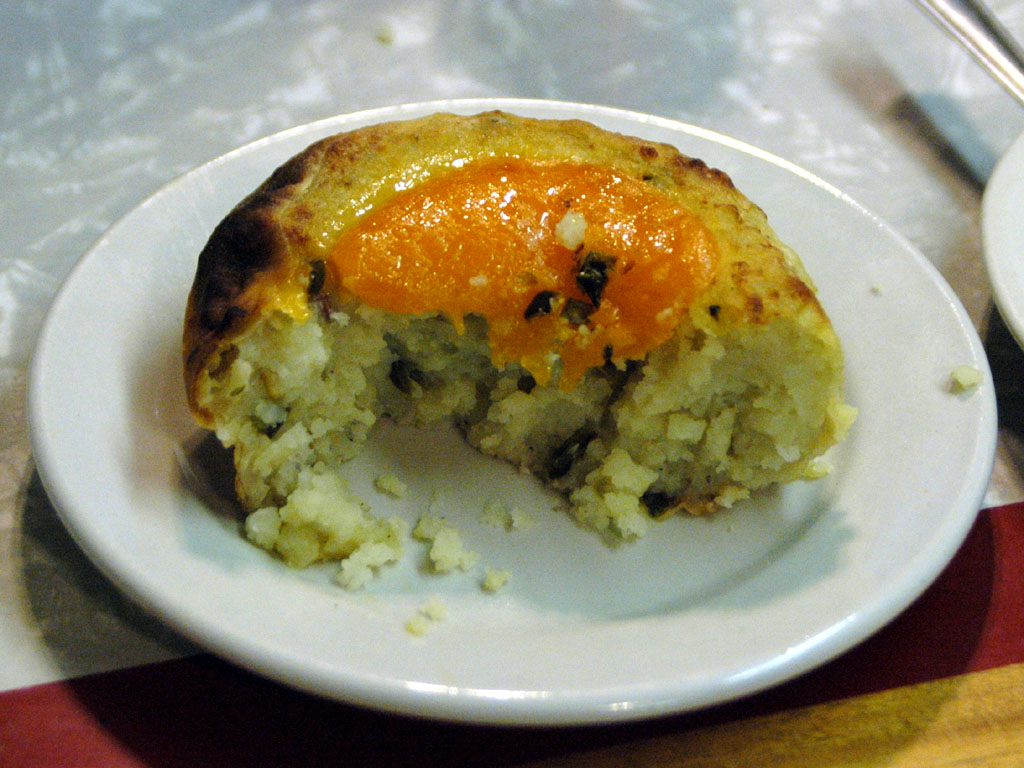
Knish, a baked snack, commonly filled with potato

- Kasha: buckwheat porridge or grains (prefabricated for a porridge). Originally a Slavic term, it probably entered into English usage with Jewish emigrants, especially the plural form Yiddish: קאַשי, romanized: kashi.
- Kibitz /ˈkɪbɪts/: To offer unwanted advice, e.g. to someone playing cards; to converse idly, hence a kibitzer, gossip (קיבעצן, kibetsn; cf. German: kiebitzen, may be related to German: Kiebitz, 'lapwing').
- Kishke (Yid. קישקע, the word is borrowed from Slavic): A kind of sausage stuffed with finely chopped potatoes, carrots, onions, spices, etc., rather than meat; in the plural kishkes informally means 'abdomen'.
- Klezmer, instrumental musical tradition of the Ashkenazi Jews of Central and Eastern Europe.
- Klutz: A clumsy person (קלאָץ, klots, 'wooden beam'; cf. German: Klotz, 'block').
- Knish /kəˈnɪʃ/: A doughy snack stuffed with potato, meat, or cheese (קניש), from Polish: knysz.
- Kosher: Correct according to Jewish law, normally used in reference to Jewish dietary laws; (slang) appropriate, legitimate (originally from כּשר, kašer/kasher).
- kugel (Yid. קוגעל): a casserole or pudding, usually made from egg noodles or potatoes.
- Kvell: To express great pleasure combined with pride (קװעלן, kveln, from an old Germanic word; cognate with German: quellen, 'swell').
- Kvetch /kəˈvɛtʃ/: to complain habitually, gripe; as a noun, a person who always complains (קװעטשן, kvetshn, 'press/squeeze'; cognate with German: quetschen, 'squeeze').

=== L ===
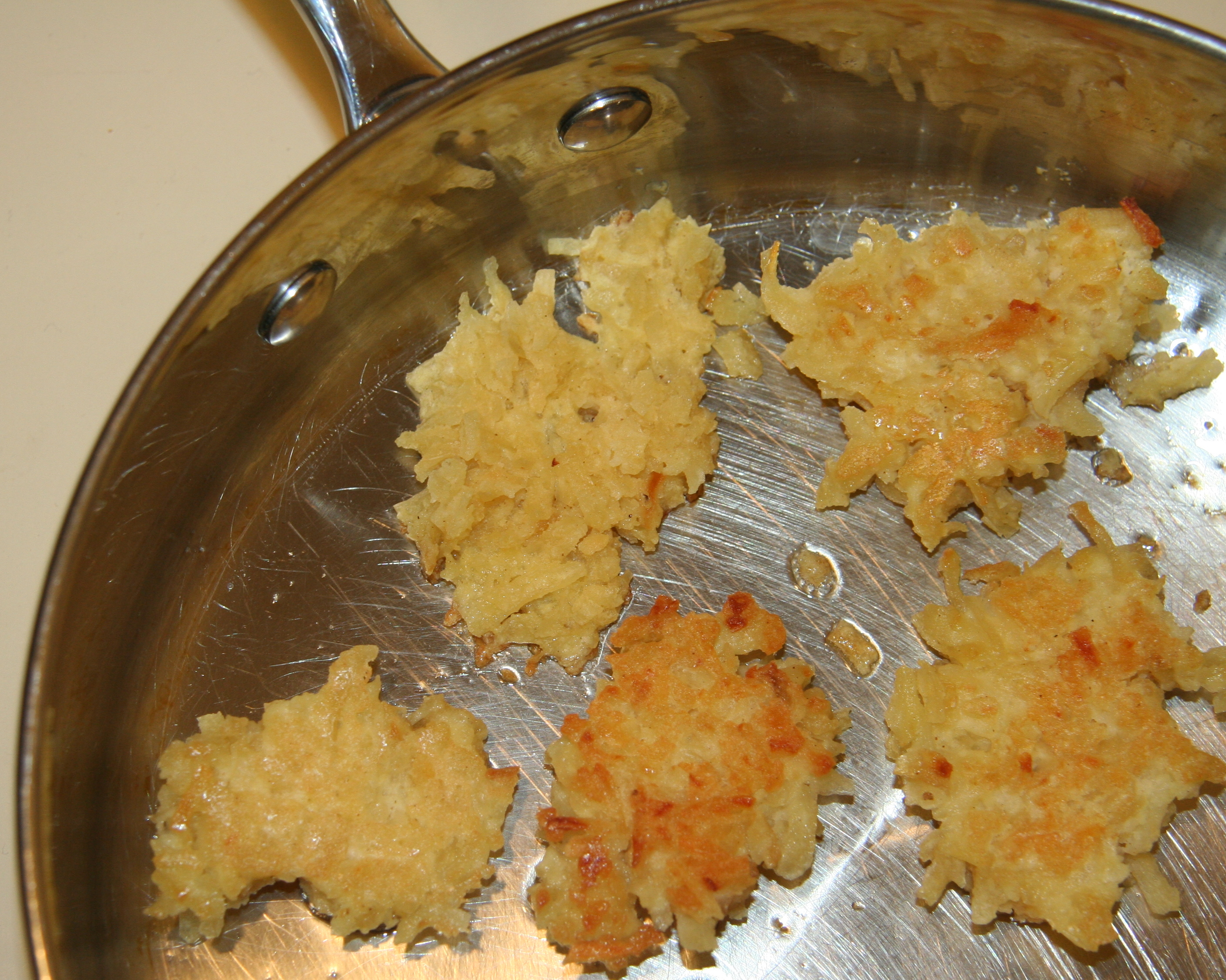
Latkes, potato pancakes

- Latke /ˈlɑːtkə/: Potato pancake, especially during Hanukkah (לאַטקע, from Russian: ладка, romanized: ladka, lit. 'pancake (colloquial; regular: оладья)' or Ukrainian: оладка, romanized: oladka, lit. 'pancake/fritter'.
- Litvak: A Jewish person historically residing in the territory of the former Grand Duchy of Lithuania, or a dialect of Yiddish used by them (ליטוואַק, litvak).
- Lox: Cured salmon, sometimes referred to as Nova, often used loosely to refer to smoked salmon (לאַקס, laks, 'salmon'; cf. German: Lachs.

=== M ===
- Mama-loshen / mame-loshen / mame-loshn (Yid. מאמאלושן): one's first or native language, from Yiddish mama (mother) plus Hebrew לשון lashon, tongue or language; usually meaning "Yiddish"
- Mamzer: Bastard (from Yiddish/Hebrew: ממזר, mamzer)
- Maven: Expert, aficionado (מבֿין, meyvn, from Hebrew: מבין, mevin, 'understands')
- Mazel tov, also Mazal tov: Congratulations! (מזל־טובֿ, mazl-tov, from Hebrew מזל טוב, mazzāl ṭōv: מזל, mazzāl, 'fortune' or 'luck' + טוב, ṭōv, 'good')
- Megillah: A tediously detailed discourse (מגלה, megile, 'lengthy document, scroll [esp. the Book of Esther]', from Hebrew מגלה, məgillā, 'scroll'. Usually used in American English as "the whole Megillah" meaning an overly extended explanation or story.
- Mensch: An upright person; a decent human being (מענטש, mentsh, 'person'; cognate with German: Mensch, 'human')
- Meshuga, also Meshugge, Meshugah, Meshuggah /məˈʃʊɡə/: Crazy (משגע, meshuge, from Hebrew: משוגע, m'shuga') Also used as the nouns meshuggener and meshuggeneh for a crazy man and woman, respectively.
- Meshugaas, also Mishegaas or Mishegoss /mɪʃəˈɡɑːs/: Crazy or senseless activity or behavior; craziness (משוגעת, meshugaas, from Hebrew: משוגעת, məšugga‘ath, a form of the above)
- Milchig: made with milk or dairy products (מילכיק, milkhik, 'milky', from מילך, milkh, 'milk'; cf. German: milchig) Usually, it is used to denote a class of kosher products.
- Minyan: The quorum of ten adult (i.e., age 13 or older) Jews that is necessary for the holding of a public worship service; in Orthodox Judaism ten adult males are required, while in Conservative and Reform Judaism ten adults of either sex are required. (מנין, minyen, from Hebrew: מנין, minyān)
- Mishpocha /mɪʃˈpɒxə/: relative or extended family member (משפּחה, mishpokhe, from Hebrew: משפּחה, mišpāḥā)

=== N ===
- Naches /ˈnɑːxəs/: The feeling of pride and/or gratification in 1: the achievements of another; 2. one's own doing good by helping someone or some organization (נחת, nakhes, from Hebrew: נחת, naḥath, 'contentment'.
- Narrischkeit /ˈnɑːrɪʃkaɪt/: Foolishness, nonsense (נאַרישקייט, narishkeyt, from נאַריש, narish, 'foolish' + ־קייט, -keyt, 'ness'; cf. German: närrisch, 'foolish'.
- Nebbish, also Nebbich: An insignificant, pitiful person; a nonentity (from interjection נעבעך, nebekh, 'poor thing!', perhaps from Czech nebohý or other Slavic source.
- Noodge, also Nudzh: To pester, nag, whine; as a noun, a pest, whiner, or anxious person (נודיען, nudyen, from Polish nudzić 'to bore' or Russian nudit' 'to wear out'.
- Nosh: Snack (noun or verb) (נאַשן, nashn; cf. German: naschen.
- Nu: A multipurpose interjection analogous to "well?", "so?", or "so what?" (נו, nu, perhaps akin to Russian: ну, nu.
- Nudnik: A pest, "pain in the neck"; a bore (נודניק, nudnik, from the above נודיען, nudyen; cf. Polish or Russian: nudny, 'boring, annoying'.

=== O ===
- Oy, Oy vey: Interjections of grief, pain, or horror (אוי וויי, oy vey, 'oh, pain!' or 'oh, woe!'; cf. German: oh weh, 'oh, woe!'.

=== P ===
- Pareve / parve /ˈpɑːrəv/: Containing neither meat nor dairy products (פּאַרעווע, pareve). Usually it is used to denote a class of kosher products.
- Pisher: a nobody, an inexperienced person (פּישער, pisher, from פּישן, pishn, 'piss'; cf. German: pissen or dialectal German: pischen.
- Potch also Petch: Spank, slap, smack (פּאַטשן, patshn; cf. German: patschen, 'slap'.
- Plotz: To burst from strong emotion; often used humorously to express minor shock or disappointment (פּלאַצן, platsn, 'crack'; cf. German: platzen).
- punim: the face (Yiddish פּנים ponem, from Hebrew פָּנִים panim).
- Putz: (vulgar) A penis, term used as an insult, a fool (פּאָץ, pots. Also an insignificant person, incompetent, or loser. As a verb, to idle, bodge, goof off.

=== S ===
- Schav: Sorrel soup. (שטשאַוו, shtshav, from Polish: szczaw).
- Schlemiel /ʃləˈmiːl/: An inept clumsy person; a bungler; a dolt (שלעמיל, shlemil or שלימיל, shlimil, probably from the Hebrew name Shelumiel; OED) The word is widely recognized from its inclusion in the Yiddish-American hopscotch chant "...schlemiel, schlimazel..." from the opening sequence of the American sitcom Laverne & Shirley.
- Schlep: To drag or haul (an object); to walk, esp. to make a tedious journey (שלעפּן, shlepn; cf. German: schleppen; OED. Also a noun, a lackey, hanger-on, or loser.
- Schlimazel also Schlemazl: A chronically unlucky person (שלימזל, shlimazl, from [Middle Dutch: slimp, 'crooked/bad' or Middle High German: slimp, 'awry' or schlimm, 'poor/lacking'] + Hebrew: מזל, mazzāl, 'luck'; cf. German: Schlamassel; OED). The difference between a schlemiel and a schlimazel is described through the aphorism, "The schlemiel spills his soup on the schlimazel."
- Schlock: something cheap, shoddy, or inferior (perhaps from שלאַק, shlak, 'a stroke'; cf. German: Schlag) OED
- Schlong: (vulgar) A penis (שלאַנג, shlang, 'snake'; cf. German: Schlange; OED)
- Schlub: A clumsy, stupid, or unattractive person (זשלאָב, zhlob, 'hick', perhaps from Polish: żłób; OED)
- Schmaltz: Melted chicken fat; metaphorically, excessive sentimentality (שמאַלץ, shmalts or German: Schmalz) OED; adjective: schmaltzy
- Schmatte: A rag (שמאַטע, shmate, from Polish: szmata; OED)
- Schmear, Shmear: Smear, spread (e.g., cream cheese on a bagel); colloq. bribe (noun or verb): (שמיר, shmir, 'smear'; cf. German: schmieren; OED). The idiom "the whole shmear" means "an entire set or group of related things" (OED).
- Schmo: A stupid person (akin to schmuck, but disputed by OED)
- Schmooze: To converse informally, make small talk or chat (שמועסן, shmuesn, 'converse', from Hebrew: שמועות, shəmūʿōth, 'reports/gossip'; OED) To persuade in insincere or oily fashion; to "lay it on thick". Noun: schmoozer, abbr. schmooze. Derivative : schmoozeoisie is the social class of those who earn their lives by talking, a portmanteau of "schmooze" + "bourgeoisie".
- Schmuck: (vulgar) A contemptible or foolish person; a jerk; (שמאָק, shmok, 'penis', probably from Old Polish smok, 'grass snake, dragon'.)
- Schmutter: Pieces of clothing; rubbish (שמאַטע, shmate, 'rag'; cf. schmatte; OED)
- Schmutz /ʃmʊts/: Dirt (שמוץ, shmuts or German: Schmutz; OED)
- Schnook: An easily imposed-upon or easily cheated person, a pitifully meek person, a particularly gullible person, a cute or mischievous person or child (perhaps from שנוק, shnuk, 'snout'; cf. Northern German: Schnucke, 'sheep'; OED)
- Schnorrer: beggar, esp. "one who wheedles others into supplying his wants" (שנאָרער, shnorer; cf. German: Schnorrer; OED)
- Schnoz or Schnozz also Schnozzle: A nose, especially a large nose (perhaps from שנויץ, shnoyts, 'snout'; cf. German: Schnauze; OED)
- Schvartze: (offensive) A Black person (from שוואַרץ, shvarts, 'black'; cf. German: schwarz; OED)
- Shabbos, Shabbas, Shabbes: Shabbat (שבת, Shabes, from Hebrew: שבת, Shabat)
- Shammes or Shamash /ˈʃɑːməs/: The caretaker of a synagogue; also, the ninth candle of the Hanukkah menorah, used to light the others (שמשׂ, shames, from Hebrew: שמש, šammāš, 'attendant'; OED)
- Shamus: a detective (possibly שאַמעס, shammes or the Irish name Seamus; OED, Macquarie)
- Shegetz: (derogatory) a young non-Jewish man (שגץ or שײגעץ, sheygets, from Hebrew: שקץ, shekets, 'abomination')
- Shemozzle: (slang) Quarrel, brawl (perhaps related to schlimazel, q.v.; OED). This word is commonly used in Ireland to describe confused situations during the Irish sport of hurling, e.g. "There was a shemozzle near the goalmouth". In particular, it was a catchphrase of 1940s–1980s television commentator Michael O'Hehir.
- Shikker, Shicker, Shickered: Drunk (adjective or noun) (שכּור, shiker, from Hebrew: שיכור, shikor; OED)
- Shiksa or Shikse /ˈʃɪksə/: (often derogatory) A young non-Jewish woman (שיקסע, shikse, a derivative of sheygets, from Polish: siksa)
- Shmendrik or Shmendrick: A foolish or contemptible person (from a character in an operetta by Abraham Goldfaden; OED)
- Shtetl: A small town with a large Jewish population in pre-Holocaust Eastern Europe (שטעטל, shtetl, 'town', diminutive of שטאָט, shtot, 'city'; cf. German: Städtl, South German / Austrian colloquial diminutive of Stadt, 'city')
- Shtibl: A small synagogue or place of prayer (שטיבל, shtibl, 'little room'; cf. German: Stüberl; OED)
- Shtick: Comic theme; a defining habit or distinguishing feature or business (שטיק, shtik, 'piece'; cf. German: Stück, 'piece'; AHD)
- Shtum: Quiet, silent (שטום, shtum, 'mute'; cf. German: stumm); OED)
- Shtup: (vulgar slang) To have sexual intercourse (שטופּ, shtoop, 'push/poke/intercourse'; cf. German: stupsen, 'poke'; OED)
- Shul: a synagogue (שול, shul, 'school', from Middle High German: schuol, 'school'; cf. German: Schule, 'school')
- Shvitz: to sweat (v.), a sauna or steam bath (n.) (שוויצן, shvitsn; cf. German: schwitzen; OED)
- Spiel or Shpiel: A sales pitch or speech intended to persuade (שפּיל, shpil, 'play' or German: (Theater-) Spiel, 'play (theater)'; AHD)

=== T ===
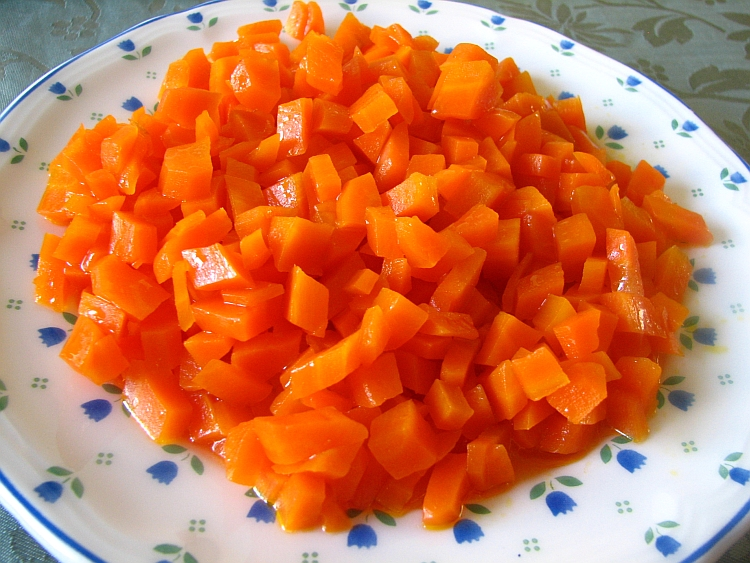
Carrot tzimmes with honey

- Tchotchke: A knickknack, trinket, curio (צאַצקע, tsatske, טשאַטשקע, tshatshke, from Polish: cacko.
- Tref or Trayf or Traif /ˈtreɪf/: Not kosher (טרייף, treyf, from Hebrew: טרפֿה, ṭərēfā, 'carrion'.
- Tsuris /ˈtsʊrɪs/: Troubles, grief (צרות, tsores/tsoris, from Hebrew: צרות, tsarot, 'troubles'.
- Tuchus (also tuches, tuchis, tukus, tuchas, or tukhus) /ˈtʊxəs/: The buttocks, bottom, rear end (תחת, tokhes, from Hebrew: תחת, taḥath, 'underneath'.
- Tummler: An entertainer or master of ceremonies, especially one who encourages audience interaction (טומלער, tumler, from טומלען, tumlen, 'make a racket'; cf. German: (sich) tummeln, 'go among people' or 'cavort'.
- Tush (also Tushy): The buttocks, bottom, rear end (תּחת, tokes; cf. tuchus.
- Tzimmes: A sweet stew of vegetables and fruit; a fuss, a confused affair, a to-do (צימעס, tsimes.

=== V ===
- Vigorish (also contraction Vig): That portion of the gambling winnings held by the bookmaker as payment for services (וויגריש, vigrish, from Russian: выигрыш, vyigrysh, 'winnings'.
- Verklempt: Choked with emotion (פֿאַרקלעמט, farklemt, 'depressed/grieving', originally 'pressed, gripped'; cf. German: verklemmt meaning 'uptight'.

=== Y ===
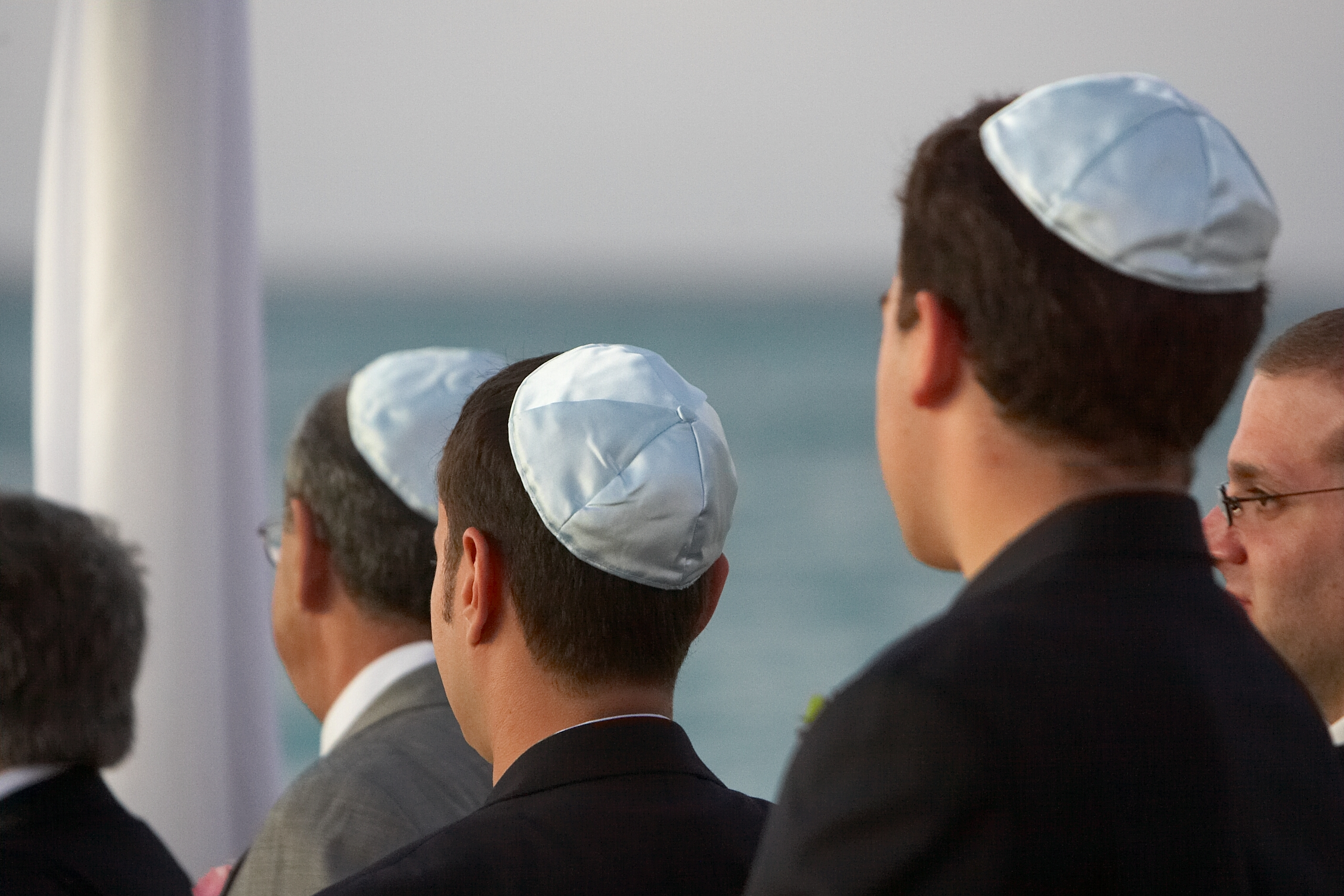
Yarmulke

- Yarmulke: A round cloth skullcap worn by observant Jewish men (יאַרמלקע, yarmlke, possibly from Polish: jarmułka and Ukrainian: ярмулка, yarmulka, 'skullcap', possibly from Turkish: yağmurluk, lit. 'raincoat/oilskin'.
- Yekke: (humorous, mildly derogatory) A German Jew; its most common usage derives from the British Mandate period to describe Fifth Aliyah German Jews, who were perceived to be more formal in dress and manners. (יעקע, yeke, 'jacket'; cf. German: Jacke.
- Yenta (variants: yente, yentl): A talkative woman; a gossip; a scold (יענטע, yente, from a given name.
- Yiddish: The Yiddish language (ייִדיש, Yidish, 'Jewish'; cf. German: jüdisch.
- Yontef also Yom Tov: A Jewish holiday on which work is forbidden, e.g. Rosh Hashanah, Yom Kippur, Pesach (יום- טובֿ, yontef, 'holiday', from Hebrew: יום טוב, yōm ṭōv, 'good day'.
- Yutz: A fool (יאָנץ, yonts, perhaps derived from putz.

=== Z ===
- Zaftig, also Zaftik /ˈzɑːftɪk/: Pleasingly plump, buxom, full-figured, as a woman (זאַפֿטיק, zaftik, 'juicy'; cf. German: saftig, 'juicy'.
- Zayde (Yid. זײדע zeyde): grandfather, old man, often a term of respect or endearment.

== See also ==
- List of English words of Hebrew origin
- List of German expressions in English
- Lists of English words by country or language of origin
- Yeshivish
- Yiddish words used in English
- Shm-reduplication, an English-language reduplication of Yiddish origin
