= Doctor Almasaro =

Doctor Almasaro, or The Jews of Palermo (Yiddish: Doctor Almasaro, oder Die Yiden in Palermo) is a historical, dramatic play in rhymed couplets by Abraham Goldfaden, written some time between 1880 and 1883. The title character's name is also variously rendered as Doctor Almasado, Doctor Almaraso, and Doctor Almasada.

Jacob Adler describes it as being written in "pure, simple Yiddish", avoiding the tendency of many Yiddish historical plays of its time to "Germanize" the Yiddish, especially for Gentile characters, a practice comparable to using many words of Latin origin in one's English. Adler criticizes it for its lack of "strong monologues", "powerful situations", and "dramatic conflict", but describes it as coming, like Shulamith and Bar Kokhba from "Goldfaden's best period", and writes that "under the calm of [the title character's] demeanor lay a grand power, a power he has sworn never to use unless all else failed," and characterizes this role as a model for "what I call the 'Grand Jew', that has given my life in the theater its greatest meaning."
