= Siftei renanot =

Siftei renanot or Sifte renanot (שפתי רננות) may refer to:

- A brief exposition of Hebrew grammar (Berlin, 1773) by Isaac Satanow
- A a commentary on the Psalms by Tunisian rabbi Khalifa Cohen
- A 1864 collection of poems translated in Hebrew by Eliahu Mordecai Werbel
- Codex Siftei Renanot, a collection of liturgical poetry (selichot)
