= David Beigelman =

Polish composer and music conductor

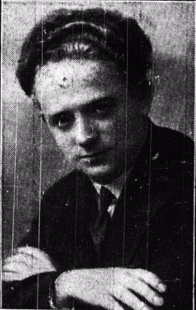
- Born: 1887; Ostrowiec, Congress Poland, Russian Empire
- Died: February 1945 (aged 57–58); Auschwitz-Birkenau, German-occupied Poland
- Other names: Dawid Bajgelman, Dawid Beigelman
- Occupation: Musician

David Beigelman (1887 – February 1945), also known as Dawid Bajgelman and Dawid Beigelman, was a Polish violinist, orchestra leader, and composer of Yiddish theatre music and songs.

== Biography ==
He was born in Ostrowiec, Congress Poland to a musical family in Łódź where he composed and performed in Yiddish theatres at a young age. He became director of the Lodz Yiddish Theater in 1912.

He wrote the music for Julius Adler's operettas Dos Skoytn-meydl and Di mume Gnendil and Yankev Vaksman's Di Sheyne Berta, all of which were staged in Łódź, and arranged the music for S. Ansky's The Dybbuk. In 1929 he was composer and music director for the Ararat Theater in Łódź.

In 1940 he was forced to move to the Ghetto Litzmannstadt in Łódź, where he took part in the ghetto's cultural life as a conductor – the ghetto's first symphony concert was performed under his direction on 1 March 1941 – and as a composer of orchestral works and songs. Two well-known Beigelman songs that have survived and are performed to this day are Kinder yorn (the years of childhood) and Tsigaynerlid (Gypsy Song), dedicated to the Romani living in the ghetto. He wrote songs to lyrics by Isaiah Spiegel including Makh tsu di eygelekh (Close Your Little Eyes) and Nisht keyn rozhinkes, nisht keyn mandlen (No raisins, no almonds, a hint to Raisins and Almonds). He also collaborated with Moishe Broderzon writing well-known songs such as Nisim, nisim and Yidn, Shmidn. He also collaborated with Moyshe Nudelman, David Herman, and Yakov Rotbaum.

In 1944, Beigelman was deported to Auschwitz, where he died in February 1945.

David Beigelman features in the novel, The Century of Zara Keff, by Jeremy Waxman, published in 2025 by The Book Guild.https://jeremywaxman.co.uk

== See also ==
- Jewish ghettos in German-occupied Poland
- List of Nazi-German concentration camps
- The Holocaust in Poland
- World War II casualties of Poland
