= Balabusta =

Good homemaker among Ashkenazi Jews

Balabusta (Yiddish: בעל־הביתטע, romanized: bal-habiste) is a Yiddish expression describing a good homemaker. The transliteration according to YIVO Standard orthography is baleboste. The expression derives from the Hebrew term for "home owner" or "master of the house" – the Hebrew compound noun בַּעַל הַבַּיִת bá'al habáyit (lit: "master of the house") was borrowed in its masculine from and was pronounced according to the conventions of Ashkenazi Hebrew as balebos; in its feminine form, it is rendered as בעל-הביתטע balabusta. The term ultimately became more popular than the original Hebrew expression for a (female) home owner, בעלת הבית bá'alat habáyit. (As used in Modern Hebrew, bá'al habáyit בעל-הבית means "landlord".)

Variants in pronunciation (balabusta and baleboste) are due to the phonologies of different Yiddish dialects, where the pronunciation of אָ (komets alef) as /ɔ/ becomes /ʊ/ in some regions.

== Connotations ==
The term historically has the positive connotation of an extremely competent and self-assured homemaker, though for some, the term has come to represent the feeling of being "chained to the stove" and denied opportunities outside the home. The traditional role of the baleboste is essentially that of the wife in Judaism; that is, she must manage the home in both practical terms - housekeeping duties such as cooking, cleaning, and maintaining the household finances - and spiritual ones, as in facilitating shalom bayit, the Jewish religious concept of general domestic harmony, and good relations between husband and wife.

Due in part to the coincidental similarity of the word to the English colloquialism "ballbuster", defined as "a person who is relentlessly aggressive, intimidating, or domineering", baleboste as used by English-speakers has taken on the connotation of assertiveness or bossiness.

== In popular culture ==
An Ashkenazi folk song, "Baleboste Zisinke" ("sweet homemaker"), was first recorded by Joel Engel, an ethnomusicologist, critic, and composer. Engel joined fellow Jewish anthropologist and writer S. An-sky on his ethnographic expedition to the Pale of Settlement, where he first heard and recorded the song.

The song was later reinterpreted by musician Socalled, who sampled a version of it for the song "Baleboste" on his 2007 album Ghettoblaster. The track also features a sample from the midcentury Jewish-American comedian Belle Barth: "She says dirty words in a cute way and everybody digs her the most . . . 'cause she's a baleboste, she makes flanken [short ribs] with kasha varnishkes."

In 1970, Barbra Streisand hosted a fundraiser for would-be Congresswoman Bella Abzug inviting volunteers to be called "Bellaboosters" as a play on the Yiddish expression, in reference to Abzug's slogan "a woman's place is in the House."

== See also ==
- Homemaker
- Jewish views of marriage
- List of English words of Yiddish origin
- Rebbetzin
- Role of women in Judaism
- Tzniut
