= Ni-be ni-me ni-kukeriku =

Ni-be ni-me ni-kukeriku, oder, kamf tsvishn bildung un fanatizm (Note: Romanian-language title: Ni-be-ni-me-ni-cucurigu. Russian title: «Ни бе, ни ме, ни кукерику, или Борьба цивилизации с фанатизмом, "Ni Be Ni Me Ni Kukeriku, or The Struggle of Civilization with Fanaticism") is an 1878 operetta by Abraham Goldfaden. The title may be translated as Not Baa, Not Mee, Not Cock-a-Doodle-Doo. The title comes from a Slavic expression, Polish: ni be ni me ni kukuryku or Russian: ни бе, ни ме, ни кукареку, meaning "cannot or do not want to say anything on the subject". The play is lost. Lulla Rosenfeld (Note: Lulla Rosenfeld was a writer and actress, a granddaughter of Jacob Adler.) in her commentary to Jacob Adler's memoir translates the title as Neither This, That, nor Kukerikoo, or The Struggle of Culture with Fanaticism. The play was first staged in Iași, Romania, in 1878.

== Plot sketch ==
Below is a sketch based on the Russian language libretto of the operetta published in 1880. The main characters are:

- Tzadik, former cobbler
- Shmaya, tzadik's gabbai or shammas, the Jewish equivalent of a sexton
- Klarette (originally Khayka (Chaya), Shmaya's daughter
- Reb Psakhya, an absent-minded rabbi
- Johann (originally Ioyna), rabbi's son
- Brothers Zindel and Grindel, young Hasids

After the death of the old tzadik, his gabbai Shmaya, in order to secure his lucrative position, announces that the tzadik made a young cobbler his successor. Klarette and Johann, who changed their Jewish names under the influence of the Enlightenment and German classical writers, clandestinely study geography and other "forbidden" subjects. Hasids find this out, Johann is brought under the judgement of the tzadik and incarcerated. Klarette frees him and they run away. Meanwhile Shmaya and the tzadik travel and give out judgements to the Jews. The tzadik, who is in fact ignorant in the laws of Judaism, keeps forgetting what he is now and makes blunders by saying something from the point of view of a cobbler, and Shmaya has to wiggle out of this. Eight years later Johann appears as a successful prosecutor, married to Klarette. In the last act the Hasids are accused of killing Ioyna and brought before prosecutor Johann. Eventually Johann reveals that he is Ioyna and dispatches a punishment to the Hasids: to dance waltz with the arrived women.

== Commentary ==
The plot, centered on a cobbler pretending to be a rabbi, a classical literary motif of the impostor. Jacob Adler wrote of it that "this thin idea had been dressed out with so much stolen music that it was shameful to hear", but Lulla Rosenfeld, writing from a distance of over a century, argues that its combination of a "serious theme with an amusing nonsense plot" was emblematic of early Yiddish theater. "This emphasis on education, progress, enlightenment," she writes, "is found nowhere else in the popular comedy and melodrama of the nineteenth century. It is special to the Yiddish theater, which was, even from the beginning, a theater of ideas."

A review of the play published in the Odessa Herald praised the play for its criticizing religious superstition. However, it singled out the character of Reb Psakhya describing him as "one remarkable type of religious-scholarly interpreter of laws, eternally immersed in Talmudic casuistry and because of it not noticing... the world, the family and his own personality... This type, snatched from life and therefore is entirely national".
