= Schlemiel =

Yiddish term meaning "incompetent person" or "fool"

Schlemiel (Yiddish: שלימיל, romanized: shlimil; sometimes spelled shlemiel) is a Yiddish term meaning "inept/incompetent person" or "fool". It is a common archetype in Ashkenazi Jewish humor, and so-called "schlemiel jokes" depict the schlemiel falling into unfortunate situations.

== Meaning ==
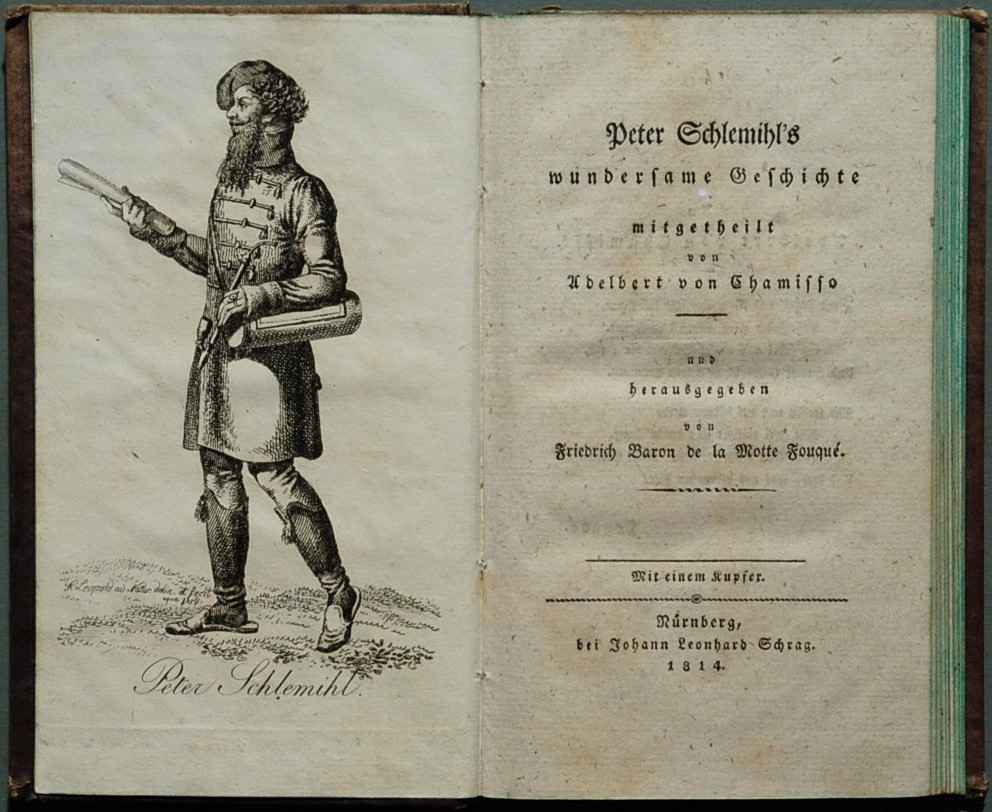
Peter Schlemihl

The inept schlemiel is often presented alongside the unlucky schlimazel. A Yiddish saying explains that "a schlemiel is somebody who often spills his soup and a schlimazel is the person it lands on". The schlemiel is similar to the schmuck but, as stated in a 2010 essay in The Forward, a schmuck can improve himself while "a schlemiel, a schlimazel and a schmendrik are irredeemably what they are".

The etymology of the term is unsure. Ernest Klein in his Etymological Dictionary of the Hebrew Language suggests that the word comes from the Hebrew term shelo mo'il, meaning "useless". Another theory is that the word is derived from the name Shelumiel, an Israelite chieftain. Heyse and some other etymologists suggest that the name comes from the words "shlomi" + "el" in the meaning "God is my salvation", i.e., a Schlemiel hopes that God will save him.

The term was popularized by the name of Peter Schlemihl, the main character of a 19th century novella by Adelbert von Chamisso.

According to Harvard University literature professor Ruth Wisse, the schlemiel as a type emerges in the Yiddish literature of the period of Jewish emancipation.

== In culture ==
- An archetype shlemiel entrepreneur is Menahem-Mendl of Sholem Aleichem.
- Isaac Bashevis Singer's Shlemiel from When Shlemiel Went to Warsaw and its adaptations
- In a 1944 essay, Hannah Arendt argues that Charlie Chaplin's Tramp character is a schlemiel whose only comfort is "the kindness and humanity of casual acquaintances".
- Many of Woody Allen's films feature Allen portraying a schlemiel type, particularly in his relations with women.
- Larry David's character on the HBO series Curb Your Enthusiasm serves as a modern schlemiel, encountering "problems that affect contemporary middle- to upper-class American Jews".
- In the sitcom Seinfeld, George Costanza "follows the pattern of the classic schlemiel", with Jerry Seinfeld's character serving as his schlimazel.
- Software engineer Joel Spolsky coined the term Schlemiel the Painter's algorithm in 2001, based on a Yiddish joke, to describe a certain type of inefficient software method.
- The titular character of the 2004 comedy film Napoleon Dynamite embodies the traits of the schlemiel, according to researcher David Buchbinder.
- In the drama series The O.C. (2003–2007), Seth Cohen's personality "is self-deprecating and in line with that of past schlemiels".
- In the 2009 film A Serious Man directed by the Coen brothers, the character of Larry Gopnik is depicted as a schlemiel.
- In "Park Safety", a 2010 episode of the NBC sitcom Parks and Recreation, Ron Swanson states that his clumsy coworker Jerry "is both the schlemiel and the schlimazel".
- In Thomas Pynchon's novel V., the protagonist Benny Profane is identified as a schlemiel numerous times.

== See also ==
- List of English words of Yiddish origin
