= Sigmund Mogulesko =

Yiddish theatre performer (1858–1914)

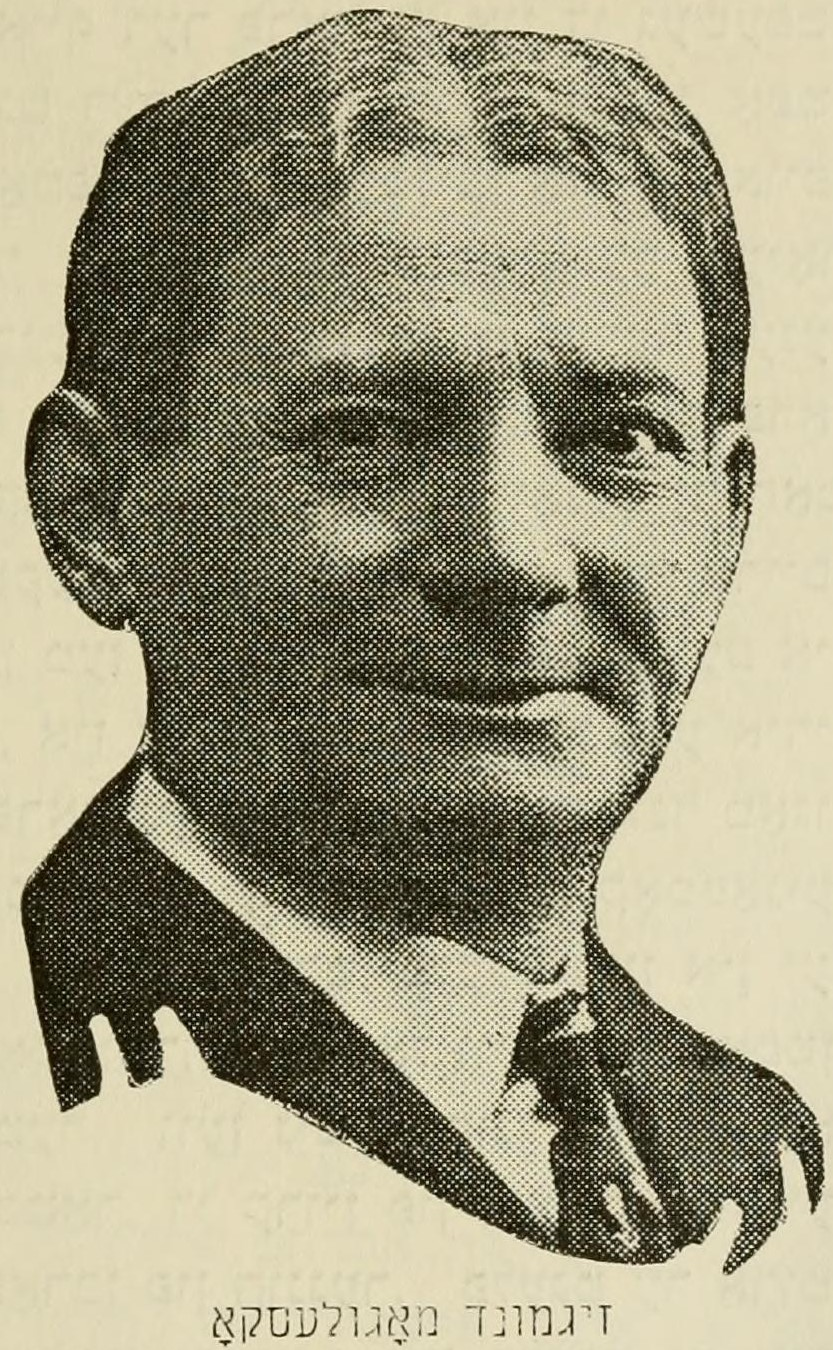
- Born: 16 December 1858; Kalarash, Bessarabia; now Călăraşi, Moldova
- Died: 4 February 1914, age 55; New York, United States
- Other names: Zelik Mogulesko, Zigmund, Siegmund, Zelig, Selig
- Occupations: Yiddish singer, actor, and composer

Sigmund Mogulesko (16 December 1858 – 4 February 1914) — Yiddish: זעליק מאָגולעסקאָ Zelik Mogulesko, first name also sometimes spelled as Zigmund, Siegmund, Zelig, or Selig, last name sometimes spelled Mogulescu — was a singer, actor, and composer in the Yiddish theater in New York City. He was born in Kalarash, Bessarabia (now Călăraşi in Moldova) and began singing in the local synagogue choir. Before reaching adolescence, he was paid nearly three times what teachers made, to sing in the synagogue of Chişinău. Soon after moving to Bucharest, Romania, he was paid to sing in churches as well as synagogues, and started acting.

He was a star in Abraham Goldfaden's first Bucharest-based theater troupe — and the playwright wrote the title role of Shmendrik for him. Mogulesko soon founded his own troupe and dominated Yiddish theatre in Romania for a decade. After immigrating to the United States, he eventually founded the Rumanian Opera House on New York City's Lower East Side, one of the great venues of Yiddish theater. The Jewish Encyclopedia described him in 1904 as "the best comedian on the Yiddish stage… He is known also as a leading composer of music for the Yiddish stage."

His "signature tune" was "Khosn kale mazel tov", which became so widespread it was mistaken for a traditional song.

== Life ==
=== Childhood and youth ===
Sigmund Mogulesko was born in Kalarash, Bessarabia (now Călăraşi in Moldova). His father died when he was nine years old, and his mother received assistance for the family from the local Jewish community. He first became a meshoyrer (choir singer) in the choir of cantor Iosif Heller, and learned to sight-read music. His mother died within a few more years.

He moved to Chişinău, where he sang in the noted choir of cantor Nisn Belzer. As a pre-adolescent singer, he was paid 60 rubles per year, a high sum at a time when the typical salary of a schoolteacher would have been about 18 rubles per year. He was soon hired away by cantor Cuper (a.k.a. Kupfer) of Bucharest's Great Synagogue, where he was engaged as a soloist. At 14 he began conservatory studies and was a prizewinning pupil.

In 1874, Mogulesko performed with a visiting French operetta troupe, where he met Lazăr Zuckermann, Simhe Dinman, and Moses Wald. The four performed together for weddings and other ceremonies as Corul Izraelit ("the Israelite Chorus"). He continued singing for the synagogue, and on Sundays was paid to sing in a church choir.

=== Life of the party ===
As his voice changed, Mogulesko worked for two years knitting, then returned to sing for Cuper at the synagogue, serving as an 18-year-old choral director. He also sang at weddings and other parties in the style of the Broder singers, and imitated well-known Bucharest actors.

In 1877 Abraham Goldfaden arrived in Bucharest with his less-than-year-old troupe, the first professional Yiddish theater company. Intrigued, Mogulesko auditioned for him. His scene inspired Goldfaden's play Shmendrik, or the Comical Wedding. The title role, written for Mogulesko, is a clueless mama's boy; it is often considered the first great role in Yiddish theater. Mogulesko is believed to have written or arranged some of the music for that play.

Describing how Goldfaden came to engage Mogulesko as an actor, Nahma Sandrow remarks: "Meshoyrerim were sophisticated musically, and were notorious for being freethinking and irreverent. As soon as Goldfadn [sic] arrived in town he heard about a young cutup who was the life of local parties, imitating scenes from Rumanian comedies and mimicking the dignified cantor he sang for. Within a year Mogulesko had become the comic genius of his generation."

Mogulesko also played various other comic, musical roles for Goldfaden, including the granddaughter in Die Bubbe mitn Einikl (Grandmother and Granddaughter), and the lead in The Intrigue, or Dvoise Intrigued. In his first non-comic role, a play by August von Kotzebue, he so upstaged the star, Israel Grodner, that Grodner quit to start his own company. Grodner soon hired Mogulesko away from Goldfaden; and eventually Mogulesko would inherit Grodner's troupe. Grodner started another.

== Romania, New York, and elsewhere ==
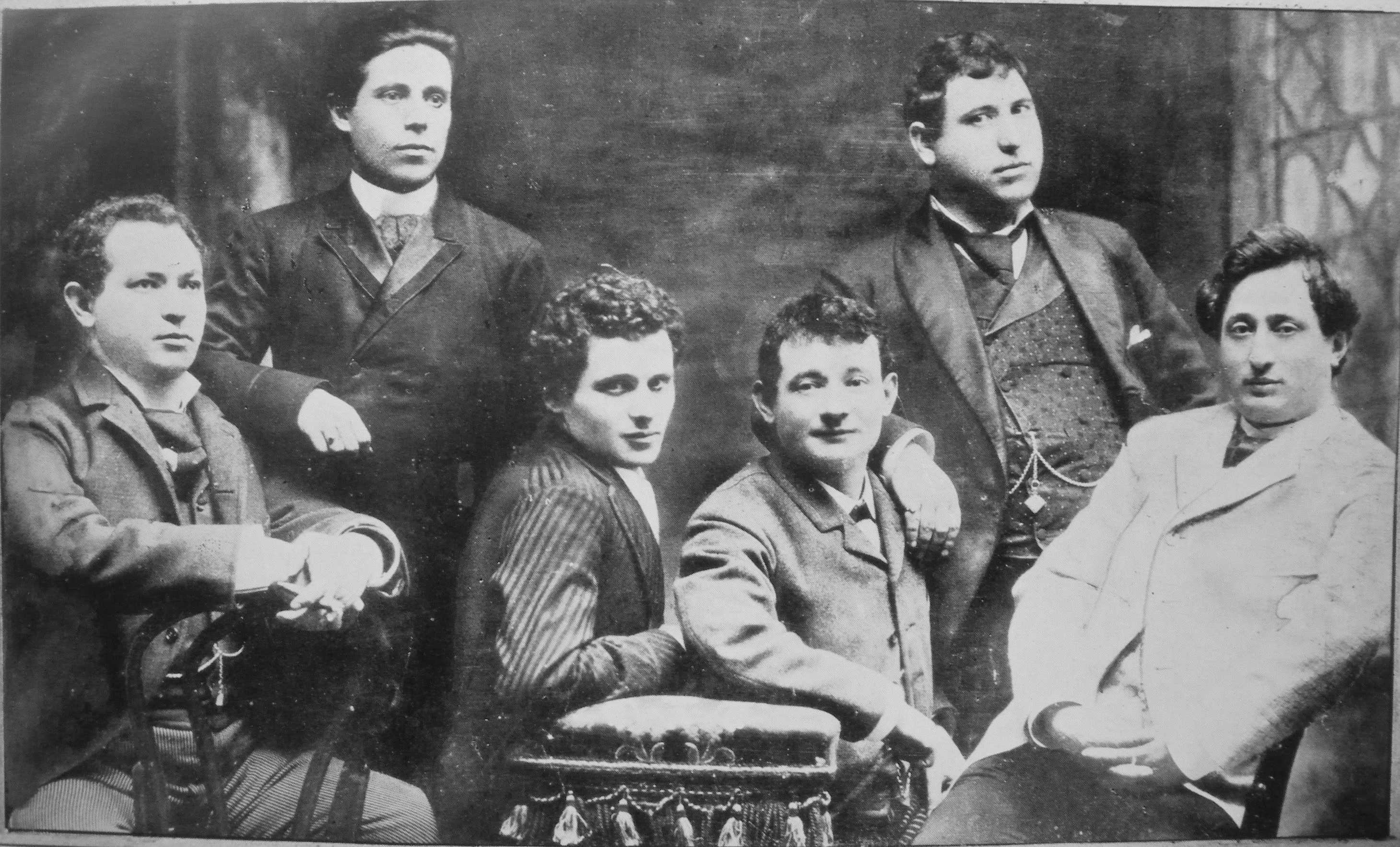
R-L: Jacob Adler, Zigmund Feinman, Sigmund Mogulesko, Rudolf Marx, Mr. Krastoshinsky and David Kessler, 1888 in New York

With his partner Moishe Finkel, over the next decade Mogulesko dominated Yiddish theater in Romania. The Jigniţa Theatre, its orchestra, and Mogulesko were lauded as comparable to the level of the National Theater. Performing in Romanian as well as Yiddish, Mogulesko drew an audience that went beyond the Jewish community. During this period, he gave David Kessler his start in theater.

At one point during this period, he and Finkel had a falling out, and he spent a summer doing garden cabaret with a quartet he formed; Finkel's troupe was unsuccessful without him, and they soon reached an understanding.

In 1886 or 1887, Mogulesko moved to New York, where he promptly became one of the first Yiddish theater stars in the New World. He later founded the Rumanian Opera House on Manhattan's Lower East Side. The first performance was Goldfaden's unsuccessful January 1888 New York debut. In New York, he introduced Jacob Adler and Keni Lipzin to the American stage, who both became highly influential.

According to the Jewish Encyclopedia, Mogulesko also performed in Russia, "Austria" (which at that time could mean anywhere in Cisleithania, and most likely means Galicia (Central Europe), probably Lvov, which had a thriving theater scene), and England.

In June 1906, Mogulesko made a successful return tour to Romania, reviving Yiddish theater there after a decade of doldrums. He brought to Romania some of the hits of New York Yiddish theater, most of which were new in that venue: Shaykevich-Shomer's Di Emigrantn ("The Emigrants") and Yekl Baltakse, and Der Umbakanter ("The Unknown") by Jacob Gordin.

== Marriage ==
He was married to Amalia Feinman. She was born about 1860 in Iasi, Romania. Her father was a cutter (of garments). She studied in a primary school and married Mogulesko at an early age. Later she performed in Goldfaden's Grandmother with Grandson ("The Teacher"), and also played in Flaterbursh ("Student"), and Perikola.

She immigrated to America with her husband, where she occasionally had a role in the theatre. They had three children: Bessie, Julius and Leeza.

== Death ==
Mogulesko died in New York in 1914. He was survived by his wife Amalie, two daughters, Bessie and Leeza, and son Dr. Julius Mogulesko. He is buried in Washington Cemetery in Brooklyn. The New York Times remarked at the time of his funeral that: "There has never been among English-speaking peoples ... such an outpouring of sympathy over the death of an actor unknown outside of his profession".

== Reputation ==
Writing of Mogulesko's troupe in Romania in 1884, and probably referring to the plays of Moses Horowitz and Joseph Lateiner, Dr. Moses Gaster was generally impressed:

Above all, we must assert that Jewish theater, through the pieces played on its stage, has indeed an educative and moral scope, because on the one hand it represents scenes from our history known by only a tiny minority, refreshing, therefore, secular memory; on the other hand, it shows us our defects, which we have like all men, but not with a tendency to strike at our own immorality with a tendency towards ill will, but only with an ironic spirit that does not wound us, as we are wounded by representations on other stages, where the Jew plays a degrading role.

- Ernest Joselovitz wrote a play about the Mogulesko troupe, Vilna's Got a Golem, set in Vilna, Lithuania during the pogroms of 1899. It is a play that celebrates the importance of Mogulesko's troupe, and the more general importance of Yiddish theatre - born in Romania - in an environment of violent repression.
