= Shmendrik, oder di komishe Chaseneh =

1877 Yiddish comedy

Shmendrik, oder di komishe Chaseneh (Yiddish: שמענדריק, אָדער, די קאָמישע חתונה, English: Schmendrik or The Comical Wedding) is an 1877 comedy by Abraham Goldfaden, one of the earliest and most enduring pieces in Yiddish theater. The title role of Shmendrik was originally written for the young Sigmund Mogulesko, and derived from a character Mogulesko did when auditioning for Goldfaden earlier that year. The role was first played by Jacob/Yankel Katzman. The role was later famously played by actress Molly Picon.

The play is loosely based on an earlier Romanian play, Vlăduțu mamei (Mama's Little Vlad), transferred to a setting in a family of Hasidic Jews, a milieu that was a standard butt of Jewish humor among the "enlightened" Jews of the Haskalah.

The secondary title is a pun on The Chymical Wedding, one of the major works of Johannes Valentinus Andreae (1586–1654), a founding work of Rosicrucianism.

According to Jacob Adler, the play was such a sensation that a year after it was first performed in Bucharest, when Israel Rosenberg set about presenting it as the second play of his newly formed Yiddish theater troupe in Odessa, the word Shmendrik had already passed into the Yiddish language, both as a term of affection and derision, but also as slang for a sneeze, for money, and for the police.

== Synopsis ==
Shmendrik is an idiotic and clueless "mama's boy," a hopelessly poor student at a religious school, whose mother is completely blind to his faults. The main plot is set in motion when his mother arranges a marriage for him; the young woman in question is not only appropriately appalled by Shmendrik, but is already in love with someone else. The plot centers on how she will evade the inappropriate marriage and be reunited with her true love.
