= Todros, Blow =

1878 play by Abraham Goldfaden

Todros, Blow or Todres the Trombonist (original Yiddish title Todros, Blos or Todres, Bloz) was an 1878 light comedic play by Abraham Goldfaden, now lost. The story centers around a man living beyond his means who has ordered his servant, Todros, to blow a trombone whenever one of his creditors approaches.

Writing his memoirs some 40 years later, Jacob Adler recalled seeing it as a young man, only a few months into his own acting career. He describes it as "a foolish comedy [translated] from the German" and adds that at the time he first saw it in Odessa, Ukraine, he, well versed in Russian theater, viewed it as an example the shortcomings of the then-nascent Yiddish theater: "Why if we must steal, I asked myself, must it always be something old and stale? Gogol's Inspector General is also about a young man with debts."
