= Raisins and Almonds =

"Raisins and Almonds"
Performed by the Singing Sergeants of the United States Air Force Band

"Raisins and Almonds" (Yiddish: ראָזשינקעס מיט מאַנדלען, romanized: Rozhinkes mit Mandlen) is a traditional Jewish lullaby popularized in the version by Abraham Goldfaden (1840-1908) for his 1880 Yiddish play, Shulamit.

Gila Flam writes that the song was based on a Yiddish folk song which was forgotten and Goldfaden's acquired the status of the folk song. It has been recorded as both a vocal and instrumental by many artists over the years, including Itzhak Perlman, Chava Alberstein, Benita Valente, and Ella Jenkins. It is a common lullaby among Ashkenazi European Jews. This song has multiple translations and multiple versions, which have slight changes in both Yiddish and English lyrics.

Several ghetto writers used Goldfaden's lullaby as the basis for new songs: out of the Kovno Ghetto came In Slobodker yeshiva (In the yeshiva of Slobodka); in the Łódź Ghetto, Dovid Beygelman and Isaiah Spiegel wrote Nit keyn rozhinkes, nit keyn mandlen (No raisins, no almonds). One verse of the song appears in the Herman Wouk novel War and Remembrance in Yiddish as well as an English translation, and also in the TV miniseries based on the book.

The motif of a cradle, a goat kid, and raisins and almonds is present in a number of other recorded Yiddish folk tunes preceding Goldfadeen's, including "Unter soreles vigele" ("Under Little Sarah's Cradle") and other variants, such as "Unter yankeles vigele" and "Unter dem kinds vigele"
