= Jacob Waxman =

Jacob Waxman, or in Yiddish Yankev Vaksman (October 22, 1866–1942) was a Yiddish playwright who wrote dramas and tragedies, as well as operettas; he also dramatized novels and stories for the Yiddish stage. His operettas include Der libling fun froyen (The Darling of Women), Malvinke vil azoy (That's How Malvinka Wants It), and Di sheyne Berta (Beautiful Bertha), which were orchestrated by Yitskhak Shlosberg (1877–1930).

== Biography ==
Born and raised in Lublin, Waxman was the son of a maskil (a supporter of the Jewish Enlightenment movement), and attended a state Jewish school. In 1882, when he was still a teenager, he joined the Yiddish theater troupe of Natan Schwartz (an associate of Abraham Goldfaden) in Lublin, singing in the chorus without remuneration. In 1884 he became a chorus singer with Joseph Weinstock, also in Lublin, and then went with the troupe on a tour, during which he made his first appearances on stage, in the troupe's Goldfaden repertoire. Upon his return to Lublin, he worked for two years in a clerical position in the local government, then, beginning in 1890 served in the Russian military. Later he worked for two years as a journalist for a Russian newspaper in Lublin. He was let go from that position after attracting the disfavor of local officials for publishing a story about the mistreatment of a Jew at the hands of the police. After that he worked for a while privately as a legal defender.

In 1916 Waxman founded his own Yiddish troupe in Lublin, first at the Pantheon Theater and later at the Rusalka Theater.
