= Schmuck (pejorative) =

Pejorative term meaning one who is stupid or foolish

Schmuck, or shmuck, is a pejorative term meaning one who is stupid or foolish, or an obnoxious, contemptible or detestable person. The word came into the English language from Yiddish (Yiddish: שמאָק, shmok), where it has similar pejorative meanings, but where its literal meaning is a vulgar term for a penis.

== Etymology ==
The Yiddish word shmok probably derives from Old Polish smok "grass snake, dragon". It is unrelated to the German word Schmuck ('jewelry'), which derives from the Middle High German word 'smucken', meaning 'nestle up'.

== Euphemisms ==
Because of its generally being considered a vulgarity, the word is often euphemized as schmoe, which was the source of Al Capp's cartoon strip creature the shmoo. Other variants include schmo and shmo.

== In Jewish-American culture ==
Leo Rosten writes in The Joys of Yiddish that schmuck is commonly viewed among Jews as an obscene word that should not be said lightly. Lenny Bruce, a Jewish stand-up comedian, wrote that the use of the word during his performances in 1962 led to his arrest on the West Coast, "by a Yiddish undercover agent who had been placed in the club several nights running to determine if [his] use of Yiddish terms was a cover for profanity".

An article in Forward attempts to draw a distinction of the term "schmuck" from other Yiddish terms for stupid and inept persons: schlemiel, schlimazel, and schmendrik, a distinction not properly drawn in dictionaries. After a number of comparisons, the author concludes: "A schmuck is, in short, someone who lacks not intelligence, but all insight into what is humanly appropriate and what is not. This makes his condition remediable. A schlemiel, a schlimazel and a schmendrik are irredeemably what they are. A schmuck can be enlightened."

== In popular culture ==
Although schmuck is considered an obscene term in Yiddish, it has become a common American idiom for "jerk" or "idiot". It can be taken as offensive, however, by some Jews, particularly those with strong Yiddish roots. Allan Sherman explained in his book The Rape of the A*P*E* that, if a word is used frequently enough, it loses its shock value and comes into common usage without raising any eyebrows.

The term was notably used in the 2010 comedy film Dinner for Schmucks, in which the plot centered on a competition among businessmen to see who could invite the biggest idiot to a monthly dinner. In her review of the film for the New York Times, film critic Debbie Schlussel took issue with the movie's use of the term, and with its use of Yiddish at all, adding: “The more correct title would have been ‘Dinner for Schlemiels'.” She added, "At The New York Times, where the word is still considered potentially offensive, the title of [the] film may be mentioned only sparingly. Still, advertisements for the movie would probably pass muster", and suggested that the main characters in the film might be more appropriately called "shmendriks".

== In bodybuilding ==
In bodybuilding culture, the term "schmoe", or "smos", is used to describe a person, often a wealthy man who is less muscular and weaker than bodybuilders, who pays bodybuilders money for private posing sessions, wrestling, and prostitution.

== See also ==
- Joe Shmoe
- Yimakh shmo
- Lance Corporal Schmuckatelli
- List of English words of Yiddish origin
