= Eliahu Mordecai Werbel =

Hebrew-language poet, translator, and educator

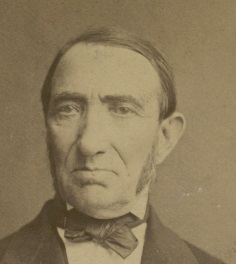
Eliahu Mordecai Werbel

Eliahu Mordecai Werbel (Hebrew: אליהו מרדכי ורבל; 1806, Tarnopol - 1880, Odessa) was a Hebrew-language poet, translator, and educator who worked in the Russian Empire.

His daughter Paulina would become Abraham Goldfaden's wife.

Of note is his 1852 romantic poem Faithful Witnesses or a Rat and a Pit (Hebrew: עדים נאמנים או חולדה ובור (subtitled "Romantic poem in four metrical cantos, the parable of the rat and the pit (Talmud Taanith fol. 8, Tosafoth)") based on a Haggadic legend A Rat and a Pit, which allegedly served as an inspiration for Goldfaden's play Shulamith . In some variants of the legend, a lad promised a lass to marry her after rescuing her from a pit. She asked "Who are the witnesses?" A rat was running by, and the lad answered "the rat and the pit". The lad forsake the wow and married another woman. But his two his sons perished: one fell into a pit, and another was bitten by a rat.

Another notable work is Siftei Renanot (1864), a collection of poems translated into Hebrew.
