= Nahma Sandrow =

American cultural historian (born 1940)

Nahma Sandrow is an American scholar of theater and cultural history, and author of the books Vagabond Stars: A World History of Yiddish Theater; God, Man, and Devil: Yiddish Plays in Translation; and Surrealism: Theater, Arts, Ideas. She is also the author of Kuni-Leml and Vagabond Stars, prize-winning Off-Broadway musicals based on Yiddish theatre material. She is Professor Emerita at Bronx Community College of the City University of New York, and has lectured at Oxford University, Harvard University, the Smithsonian Institution, and elsewhere.

Joseph Papp, writing in the New York Times Book Review, observed about Vagabond Stars: "what makes Sandrow's work distinctive is the unusual blend of impeccable scholarship and hilarious backstage anecdote."

In 1984 Samuel Freedman, of the New York Times, described the Off-Broadway success of Kuni-Leml, based on Abraham Goldfaden's Yiddish play The Two Kuni-Lemls, of 1880, as "largely attributable to Nahma Sandrow", noting that her work in researching, translating, and adapting the play had yielded a production with contemporary resonance.

== Selected works ==
=== Books ===
- Surrealism: Theater, Arts, Ideas
- Vagabond Stars: A World History of Yiddish Theater. New York: Harper & Row, 1977; reprint: Syracuse, NY: Syracuse University Press, 1996. ISBN 9780815603290
- God, Man, and Devil: Yiddish Plays in Translation

=== Drama ===
- Vagabond Stars
- Kuni-Leml
