= Shulamith (play) =

Operetta by Abraham Goldfaden

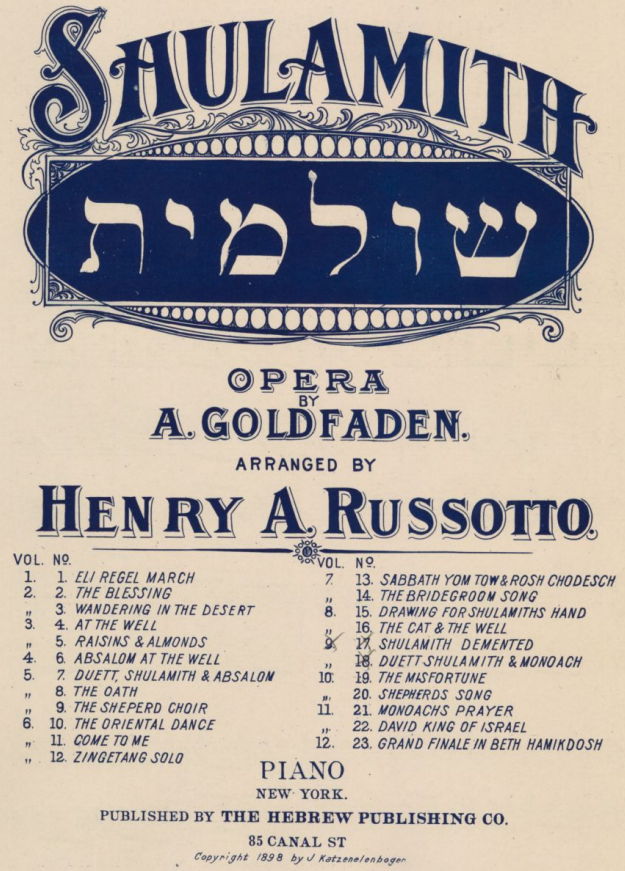
Title page of the scores of Shulamith arranged by Henry A. Russotto, 1898

Shulamith, or Daughter of Jerusalem (Yiddish: שולמית, אדער, בת-ירושלים, romanized: Shulamit, oder, Bas-Yerusholayim) is an operetta ("musical melodrama") in four acts by Abraham Goldfaden.

Musicologist Susan M. Filler asserts that Shulamith is the best known Goldfaden's work and the most familiar number from the play is "Raisins and Almonds".

== Plot sketch ==
Shulamith falls into a well, Absalom rescues her and they vow to marry each other. However, Absalom breaks his vow by marrying Abigail. Their two children tragically die. Absalom thinks this was because the broken vow, leaves his wife, sets to find Abigail, an all comes to a kind of a happy end.

== History ==
It was written in 1880, first staged in 1882 in a Yiddish theater in New York and published in Odessa, 1883; Warsaw, 1886; New York, 1893. It was translated to Hebrew by Yankev (Yaakov) Lerner (Warsaw, 1921) as שולמית: חזיון מימי קדם (Shulamith: A Vision from Ancient Times). In 1957, two versions of Shulamith were staged, at the Ohel Theatre and at Do-Re-Mi in Tel Aviv. Both theaters decided to make the play closer to the modern Israel and added several new numbers. At Do-Re-Mi, the songs were added by Moshe Wilensky, the part of Shulamith was played by the star of the time, Shoshana Damari, the play was very successful and was dubbed "the first Hebrew musical".
