= Adler (surname) =

Adler is a surname of German origin meaning eagle. and has a frequency in the United Kingdom of less than 0.004%, and of 0.008% in the United States. In Christian iconography, the eagle is the symbol of John the Evangelist, and as such a stylized eagle was commonly used as a house sign/totem in German-speaking areas. From the tenement the term easily moved to its inhabitants, particularly to those having only one name. This phenomenon can be easily seen in German and Austrian censuses from the 16th and 17th centuries.

== Notable Adlers ==
=== Actors, writers and producers ===
- Alfred Adler (1870–1937), Austrian doctor and psychotherapist
- Allen Adler (1916–1964), American writer
- Bill Adler (born 1951), American music journalist
- Bruce Adler (1944–2008), American actor
- Celia Adler (1891–1979), American Jewish actress
- Charles Adler (broadcaster) (born 1954), Canadian broadcaster
- Charlie Adler (born 1956), American voice actor
- Cyrus Adler (1863–1940), American educator
- David A. Adler (born 1947), Writer of children's books
- Elizabeth Adler (born 1950), British author
- Elkan Nathan Adler (1861–1946), British historian and manuscript collector
- Friedrich Adler (writer) (1857–1938), Czech-Austrian politician
- Helena Adler (1983–2024), Austrian writer and visual artist
- H. G. Adler (1910–1988), German Jewish poet and novelist
- Jacob Pavlovich Adler (1855–1926), born Yankev P. Adler, Ukrainian-born Jewish actor and a star in Yiddish theater
- Jay Adler (1896–1978), American actor in theater, television, and film
- Jerry Adler (1929–2025), American theater director, production supervisor and television and film actor
- Julius Ochs Adler (1892–1955), American publisher, journalist, and United States Army General
- Jussi Adler-Olsen (born 1950), Danish writer
- Katya Adler (born 1972), British journalist, who is the BBC's Europe editor
- Laure Adler (born 1950), French journalist, writer, publisher, radio and TV producer
- Lou Adler (journalist) (1929–2017), American broadcaster
- Lou Adler (1933–), American record producer, manager, and director
- Luther Adler (1903–1984), American actor and director on Broadway
- Margot Adler (1946–2014), author, journalist, Wiccan priestess and elder, NPR correspondent in New York City
- María Raquel Adler (1900–1974), Argentine poet
- Maurice Adler (1909–1960), American film producer and 20th Century Fox production head
- Max Adler (actor) (born 1986), American actor
- Mortimer J. Adler (1902–2001), American Aristotelian philosopher, author, and educator
- Renata Adler (born 1938), American journalist and writer
- Rudolf Adler (1941–2025), Czech film director, screenwriter and film educator
- Sara Adler (1858–1953), Ukrainian Jewish actress in Yiddish theater
- Sonya Adler or Sonya Oberlander (c.1862–1886), one of the first women to perform in Yiddish theater in Imperial Russia
- Stella Adler (1901–1992), Jewish-American actress and acting teacher
- Warren Adler (1927–2019), American writer
- Sarah Adler (born 1978), French actress

=== Engineers and scientists ===
- Ada Adler (1878–1946), Danish classical scholar
- August Adler (1863–1923), Austrian mathematician
- Benjamin Adler (1903–1990), American inventor
- Charles Adler Jr. (1899–1980), American inventor
- Darin Adler, software architect
- David Adler (1935–1987), American physicist
- Edda Adler (born 1937), Argentine chemist and biologist
- George J. Adler (1821–1868), a noted philologist, linguist and author of A Practical Grammar of the Latin Language
- Howard I. Adler (1931–1998), biologist, founder of Oxyrase Inc.
- Irving Adler (1913–2012) author, mathematician, scientist, political activist and educator
- Johan Gunder Adler (1784–1852), Danish civil servant and a co-author of the Constitution of Norway
- Mark Adler (born 1959), Mars Exploration Rover mission manager, co-author of zlib, inventor of Adler-32 checksum
- Nancy Adler (1946–2024), American health psychologist
- Robert Adler (1913–2007), inventor of the remote control
- Saul Adler (1895–1966), British-Israeli expert on parasitology
- Stephen L. Adler (born 1939), American physicist
- Jonathan Adler (born 1988), Israeli engineer
- Regina Kapeller-Adler (1900–1991), Austrian biochemist and inventor of histidine-detecting urine pregnancy tests

=== Musicians ===
- Chris Adler (born 1972), drummer of the metal band Lamb of God
- Cisco Adler (born 1978), the artist featured in all songs of the artist Shwayze
- Guido Adler (1855–1941), Bohemian-Austrian musicologist and writer on music
- Hans G. Adler (1904–1979), South African pianist, musicologist, and antique keyboard instrument collector
- Henry Adler, American drum kit educator, player and actor
- Hugo Chaim Adler (1896–1955), Belgian composer, cantor, and choir conductor
- James Adler (born 1950), American composer and pianist
- Julia Rebekka Adler (born 1978), German violist
- Larry Adler (1914–2001), American musician, widely acknowledged as one of the world's most skilled harmonica players
- Oskar Adler (1875–1955), Austrian violinist, physician and esoteric savant, brother of Max Adler.
- Richard Adler (1921–2012), Jewish-American lyricist, composer and producer of several Broadway shows
- Samuel Adler (born 1928), Jewish-American composer and conductor
- Steven Adler (born 1965), a drummer for the hard rock band Guns N' Roses
- Vincent Adler, Hungarian pianist and composer
- Willie Adler (born 1976), guitarist of the metal band Lamb of God

==== Conductors ====
- Frederick Charles Adler (1889–1959), London-born conductor known as "F. Charles Adler"
- Kurt Adler (1907–1977), Austrian-American conductor, Metropolitan Opera Chorus Master from 1943 to 1973
- Kurt Herbert Adler (1905–1988), Vienna-born American conductor, San Francisco Opera general director from 1953 to 1981
- Peter Herman Adler (1899–1990), Czech-born American conductor, director of NBC Opera Theatre from 1950 to 1964

=== Politicians ===
- Brigitte Adler (1944–2004), German politician
- Charles S. Adler (1862–1911), American politician from New York
- Ernie Adler (born 1950), American politician from Nevada
- Friedrich Adler (1879–1960), Austrian revolutionary politician, son of Viktor Adler
- John Adler (1959–2011), American politician from New Jersey
- Julius Adler (1894–1945), German politician
- Steve Adler (born 1956), American politician, former mayor of Austin, Texas
- Victor Adler (1852–1918), Austrian Social Democratic leader

=== Rabbis and theologians ===
- Felix Adler (professor) (1851–1933), leader of ethical humanism
- Hermann Adler (1839–1911), Orthodox Chief Rabbi of the British Empire, 1891–1911
- Johann Kaspar Adler (1488–1560), also Kaspar Aquila or Caspari Aquilae, German reformer
- Michael Adler (1868–1944), first Jewish chaplain to the British Army
- Nathan Adler (1741–1800), German kabbalist
- Nathan Marcus Adler (1803–1890), Orthodox Chief Rabbi of the British Empire, 1845–1891
- Samuel Adler (rabbi) (1809–1891), German-American Reform rabbi

=== Athletes ===
- Anders Adler (born 1982), Swedish ice hockey player
- Daniel Adler (sailor) (born 1958), Brazilian sailor
- Eric Adler (born 2000), American baseball player
- Jens Adler (born 1965), German football player
- Kim Adler, American bowler
- Max Adler (lacrosse) (born 1994), American lacrosse player
- Nicky Adler (born 1985), German football player
- Nikki Adler (born 1987), German boxer
- Oliver Adler (born 1967), German football player
- Reinhard Adler (1947–2025), German football player
- René Adler (born 1985), German football player
- Thomas Adler (born 1965), German football player

=== Others ===
- Alfred Adler (1870–1937), Austrian psychologist, founder of the school of individual psychology
- Coleman Adler (1868–1938), Jeweler and founder of Adler's Jewelry in New Orleans in 1898
- Daniel Adler (prosecutor) (born 1963), Argentine lawyer
- Dankmar Adler (1844–1900), German-born American architect
- David B. Adler (1826–1878), Jewish-Danish banker
- David R. K. Adler (born 1993 or 1994), French-American activist and economist
- Freda Adler (born 1934), criminologist
- Friedrich Adler (architect) (1827–1908), German architect and archaeologist
- Friedrich Adler (artist) (1878–1942), German artist and designer, murdered in the Holocaust
- Hans Hermann Adler (1891–1956), German professor of journalism at the University of Heidelberg
- Jacob O. Adler (1913–1999), Professor of Economics and Business at the University of Hawaii
- Jankel Adler (1895–1949), Polish painter and printmaker
- Jonathan Adler (born 1966), American potter, designer, and author
- Jonathan H. Adler (born 1969), Professor of Law at Case Western University School of Law
- Karl-Heinz Adler (1927–2018), German artist
- Martin Adler (1958-2006), Swedish cameraman and journalist
- Matthew Adler (born 1962), American law professor
- Max Adler (Sears) (1866–1952), American businessman and philanthropist
- Max Adler (Marxist) (1873–1937), Austrian social theorist, brother of Oskar Adler.
- Rodney Adler (born 1959), Australian businessman and white collar criminal
- Ruth Adler (1944–1994), feminist, human rights campaigner and child welfare advocate
- Saidie May (1879–1951), born as Saidie Adler, American art collector
- Salomon Adler (1630–1709), German painter of the Baroque period
- Solomon Adler (1909–1994), Soviet spy who supplied information to the Silvermaster espionage ring
- Valerie Adler, South African artist

== Fictional characters ==
- Adler von Berg, a Luftwaffe pilot-turned-adventurer, of the Belgian comics series Adler by René Sterne
- Grace Adler, female lead in the TV series Will and Grace
- Henry Adler, main character in David Wellington's film I Love a Man in Uniform
- Irene Adler, fictional character featured in the Sherlock Holmes story "A Scandal in Bohemia" by Arthur Conan Doyle.
- Judith Adler, fictional character in The Case of the Toxic Spell Dump by Harry Turtledove
- Klaus Adler, would-be Führer of the Moon Nazis in the movie Iron Sky (2012)
- Rafe Adler, the main antagonist of Uncharted 4: A Thief's End
- Russell Adler, a character of Call of Duty: Black Ops Cold War by Treyarch
- Sadie Adler, character in Red Dead Redemption 2
- Samantha Adler, arms dealer in the novel series Son Altesse Sérénissime
- Scott Adler, a fictional character featured in the Tom Clancy Jack Ryan universe novels. Adler is a career U.S. Department of State employee who rises throughout the series, eventually becoming Secretary of State.
- Vincent Adler, antagonist behind the first two seasons of White Collar
- Wilhelm Adler, main character in Saul Bellow's novella Seize the Day
- Ben Adler, recurring character in the second season of Lost in Space (2018)
