= Hans Adler =

Hans Adler may refer to:

- Hans Adler (poet) (1880–1957), German poet
- Hans Adler (business), food industry business
- Hans G. Adler (1904–1979), musician, musicologist and collector in South Africa
- H. G. Adler (1910–1988), German writer
- Hans Hermann Adler (1891–1956), German professor of journalism at the University of Heidelberg

== See also ==
- Samuel Hans Adler (born 1928), German-born American composer
