= David Adler =

David Adler may refer to:

- David Adler, pseudonym of American screenwriter Frank Tarloff
- David Adler, founding president of the Australian Jewish Association
- David Adler (architect) (1882–1949), American architect
- David Adler (physicist) (1935–1987), American physicist
- David A. Adler (born 1947), American author
- David B. Adler (1826–1878), Danish banker and politician
- David R. K. Adler (born 1992), French-American activist

== See also ==
- Adler (surname), a surname
- Adler (disambiguation)
