= Angelo Mascheroni =

Angelo Mascheroni may refer to:

- Angelo Mascheroni (bishop) (born 1929), Italian Roman Catholic bishop
- Angelo Mascheroni (composer) (1855–1905), Italian pianist composer, conductor and music teacher
