= Charles Adler =

Charles Adler may refer to:

- Charles Adler (broadcaster) (born 1954), Canadian Senator and broadcaster
- Charlie Adler (born 1956), American voice actor
- Frederick Charles Adler (1889–1959), usually known as F. Charles Adler, English-German conductor
- Charles Adler Jr. (1899–1980), American inventor
- Charles S. Adler (1862–1911), Jewish-American politician from New York
- Charles Adler, co-founder of Kickstarter

== See also ==
- Adler (surname)
