= Vicente Locaso =

Argentine footballer

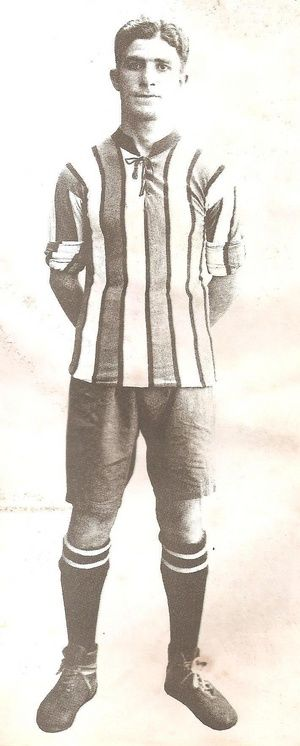

Personal information
- Date of birth: 22 January 1909
- Place of birth: Buenos Aires, Argentina
- Date of death: 4 April 1994 (aged 85)
- Position: Forward

Senior career*
Years	Team	Apps	(Gls)
1928–1932	River Plate		
1932	Huracán		
1933	Gimnasia de La Plata		
- * Club domestic league appearances and goals

Vicente Locaso (12 January 1909 – 4 April 1994) was an Argentine footballer who served as a forward.

He debuted for Club Atlético River Plate on August 26, 1928, against Sportivo Barracas in a 2–1 victory. It was Locaso who scored the first goal when the club turned professional in 1931 in a 1–0 victory against Atlanta. In a close game, in the 18th minute of the first half, Locaso took the ball near the area, after a couple of rebounds, and finished a cross, beating Mascheroni. At the end of the 1931–32 season he played his last competitive match in a loss to Boca Juniors 0–3, on January 6 of 1932 . He then joined Huracán and the following season joined Gimnasia de La Plata, but injury prevented him from playing, forcing him to retire.
