= Adlerz =

Adlerz is a surname. Notable people with the surname include:

- Erik Adlerz (1892–1975), Swedish diver
- Märta Adlerz (1897–1979), Swedish diver, sister of Erik

== See also ==
- Adler (disambiguation)
