= Daniel Adler =

Daniel Adler may refer to:

- Daniel Adler (prosecutor) (born 1958), from Argentina
- Daniel Adler (sailor) (born 1958), from Brazil
- Danny Adler, American blues-rock guitarist
