= Mascheroni =

Mascheroni is a surname. Notable people with the surname include:

- Adriano Mascheroni (died 1531), Italian Roman Catholic prelate
- Angelo Mascheroni (bishop) (born 1929), Italian Roman Catholic bishop
- Angelo Mascheroni (composer) (1855–1905), Italian pianist, composer, conductor and music teacher
- Carlo Mascheroni (born 1940), Italian equestrian
- Edoardo Mascheroni (1852–1941), Italian composer and conductor
- Ernesto Mascheroni (1907–1984), Uruguayan footballer
- Fabio Mascheroni (born 1977), Italian long-distance runner
- Lorenzo Mascheroni (1750–1800), Italian mathematician
- Marcelo Mascheroni (born 1959), Argentine field hockey player
- Oliviero Mascheroni (1914–1987), Italian football player
