= Adler =

Adler may refer to:

== Legal ==
- Adler v Ontario, constitutional decision of the Supreme Court of Canada

== Places ==
- Adler, Alabama, an unincorporated community in Perry County
- Adler Planetarium, Chicago, Illinois, USA
- Adler Township, Nelson County, North Dakota, USA
- Adler University, formerly Adler School of Professional Psychology, in Chicago, Illinois, USA
- Adlersky City District, Sochi, Russia
  - Adler Microdistrict, a resort in Sochi, Russia
  - Adler railway station, a station serving the city

== Sports ==
- Adler Mannheim, a German ice hockey team
- Berlin Adler, an American football team in Berlin
- Nickname of the sports club Eintracht Frankfurt
- Nickname for the Germany national football team

== Transportation ==
- SS Adler, a number of steamships
- Adler (cars and motorcycle), an early 20th-century automobile. The firm also produced typewriters and other office equipment.
- Adler (locomotive), the first German steam locomotive (1835)
- Adler or Adlerwerke vorm. Heinrich Kleyer, a German aircraft manufacturer

== Other uses ==
- Adler (band), an American rock band
- Adler (comics), a Franco-Belgian comics series by René Sterne
- Adler (surname), surname of Germanic origin
- Adler Seeds, an American company based in Indiana
- Operation Adler, three World War II military operations
- Adler, the symbol of the Germanic eagle

== See also ==
- Adler-32, checksum algorithm
- Adlertag, or the Day of the Eagle, German name for the first day of operations of the Battle of Britain in 1940
