= Inyoni =

Inyoni may refer to:-

- Inyoni, a model of knife manufactured by Chris Reeve Knives 2005–15; 2022-present
- SS Inyoni a South African steamship in service 1957–62
