= August Adler =

Czech mathematician (1863-1923)

August Adler (24 January 1863, Opava, Austrian Silesia – 17 October 1923, Vienna) was a Czech and Austrian mathematician noted for using the theory of inversion to provide an alternate proof of Mascheroni's compass and straightedge construction theorem.
