= Heinrich Gottfried Ollendorff =

German grammarian and language educator

Heinrich Gottfried Ollendorff (also later known as Henri Godefroy Ollendorff) (1803 in Rawicz near Poznań – 3 April 1865 in Paris) was a German grammarian and language educator, whose "modern method" of learning foreign languages came into vogue from the 1840s.

== Life and career ==
After graduating as a doctor of philosophy at the University of Jena, Ollendorff emigrated to London, where he developed "la méthode Ollendorff" (the Ollendorff method), a new way of learning foreign languages based on oral communication rather than on textual comprehension as used in the traditional "grammar translation" method. He refined this method over the years. He became a language teacher in Paris in 1830 and published textbooks there for various languages, including German, French, Italian, Spanish, Modern Greek, Latin and other languages.

His work Méthode de l'allemand à l'usage des français (1833) was approved for public teaching in French schools by the French Minister of Education, Narcisse-Achille de Salvandy.

The popularity of his works and the fact that French copyright law did not apply in Frankfurt am Main led to pirated copies being printed in that city by the publishing house Carl Jügel (under the name of Charles Jugel at the German and Foreign Library). In 1850 Ollendorff brought a legal case against a London bookseller, Alexander Black, for importing pirated copies of one of his books purported to have been printed in Frankfurt am Main.

In 1898 Antonin Nantel's Nouveau cours de langue anglaise selon la méthode d'Ollendorff à l'usage des écoles, académies, pensionnats et colléges, an English primer based on the Ollendorff method was published by the Montreal publisher Librairie Beauchemin for use in French-speaking schools in Canada.

== La méthode Ollendorff ==
Ollendorff was heavily indebted to an early "modern method" teacher, Jean (John) Manesca, who appears to have written the first fully developed modern method language course in the early 1820s. That work was designed for French, and Ollendorff was keen to see it adopted for other modern and classical languages. He would in the decades from the 1830s write and publish numerous foreign languages primers (firstly for modern languages and then for classical languages) based on Manesca's methodology and adding features of his own, which he promoted as "la méthode Ollendorff".

In the 1840s Ollendorff also wrote the first post-Renaissance textbook for conversational Latin, the Nouvelle méthode pour apprendre, à lire, a écrire et à parler une langue en six mois, appliquée au Latin. Ollendorff's French text contains little on grammar, and is almost entirely intuitive, with learning based on practice alone, not theory. George J. Adler's American edition is an extensive revision of Ollendorff's first attempt, including grammar; this version of the Ollendorff text has 600 pages of very fine print, with copious exercises. Adler also expanded and re-wrote the Latin text, resulting a much higher quality textbook, with more elegant Latin, and a wider variety of examples based on the historical classic sources.

Again following Manesca, Ollendorf wrote foreign language teaching books not only for modern languages but also for the classical languages. Manesca had written:

If I have not spoken of the advantages that may be derived from the present mode of teaching applied to dead languages, it is not because I entertain the smallest doubt of its efficacy in that particular; for, on the contrary, I am confident that many years of toilsome, tedious, and almost fruitless labours, would be saved by the adoption of such a method for these languages. A well disposed young man, between eighteen and twenty, well versed in the principles of his mother tongue, would, in twelve months, acquire a sufficient knowledge of Latin or Greek for all the purposes of life. Such a consideration well deserves the attention of the few scholars competent for a task which would prove so beneficial to the present and future generation of collegiate students. The present modes of teaching the dead languages are sadly defective. It is high time that a rational, uniform method should be adopted.

The French-Latin Ollendorff was, as far as can be ascertained, the first textbook written in modern times aimed at teaching Latin as a spoken language, using "modern" methods. Manesca's method was never translated directly into Latin or Greek for publication, although it did appear in a Spanish edition written by Carlos Rabadan. The utopian socialist Albert Brisbane describes in his biography, Albert Brisbane: A Mental Biography (1893), in some detail his private classes in French and Spanish with Manesca in New York, says that he studied Latin using the same method. If Manesca ever wrote up any Latin exercises, perhaps they only survive in manuscript among his papers. The Ollendorff version went through several editions, and was quite popular for private pupils, but it was never taken up by schools for teaching Latin. Adler's American edition seems to have suffered the same fate, and original copies of it are very hard to come by, although it is now available as a reprint.

The Ollendorff method likely influenced the development of other well-known 19th century foreign language learning methods, for example, the Method Gaspey-Otto-Sauer which was widely used until the 1950s.

== In popular literature ==
=== H. G. Wells ===
Ollendorff's name is used as an epithet in H.G. Wells' The Island of Doctor Moreau:

"Yesterday he bled and wept," said the Satyr. "You never bleed nor weep. The Master does not bleed or weep." "Ollendorffian beggar!" said Montgomery, "you'll bleed and weep if you don't look out!"

Montgomery is mocking the Satyr's repetitive discourse, as Ollendorff's texts rely heavily on repetition, likening this to playing musical scales. They also use artificially constructed sentences, which, while illustrating grammar and tense well enough, are extremely unlikely to occur in real life.

=== Mark Twain ===
Mark Twain ridicules Ollendorf's sentences––questions in particular––for just that quality. In Chapter XXX of his Roughing It (1872), a memoir of his years in Nevada and California, he writes:

Before leaving Carson, the Secretary and I had purchased 'feet' from various Esmeralda stragglers. We had expected immediate returns of bullion, but were only afflicted with regular and constant 'assessments' instead—demands for money wherewith to develop the said mines. These assessments had grown so oppressive that it seemed necessary to look into the matter personally. Therefore I projected a pilgrimage to Carson and thence to Esmeralda. I bought a horse and started, in company with Mr. Ballou and a gentleman named Ollendorff, a Prussian—not the party who has inflicted so much suffering on the world with his wretched foreign grammars, with their interminable repetitions of questions which never have occurred and are never likely to occur in any conversation among human beings.

Twain has in mind such sentences as the following, which appear in Nouvelle Méthode de H. G. Ollendorff Pour Apprendre À Lire, À Écrire Et À Parler Une Langue Clef de la grammaire anglaise à l'usage des français, ou Traduction des thèmes contenus dans cet ouvrage, an Ollendoffian primer meant to teach English to speakers of French:

"Have you any more partridges ? — No, Sir, I have sent them all to my uncle. — Do you want any more paper? — I want a great deal. — How many pair of scissors have you left? — I have six pair left. — Of whom do you speak? — I speak of the lazy scholars of the good teachers. — Of which teachers ? — Of those whom you know. — At what o'clock do you come back from your shop? — I usually come back at a quarter before eight. — Is the young Frenchman, who lives at your house, still at home? — Yes, he is still at home, but in bed. — Why is he in bed so late? — He came back from the theatre at about midnight or a quarter past twelve yesterday, and now he has the head-ache. — When does he usually go out in the morning? — He usually goes out at a quarter or twenty minutes past nine. — Do you come home late in the night? — No, I usually come home about ten o'clock. — Do you go immediately to bed? — Yes, I go immediately to bed, but I read a long time in my bed. — It is a bad habit, it spoils your eyes, and you could set your bed-room on fire. — Is your brother here? — He is somewhere, but not here. — Is he at home? — No, he is somewhere else. — Where do you go to-night? — I go into the country. — Does your brother go there also? — No, he goes nowhere."

=== Rudyard Kipling ===
In his account in his From Sea to Sea of a visit to Yellowstone National Park, Rudyard Kipling complains: "Be it known that the Park is laid out, like Ollendorf, in exercises of progressive difficulty."

=== P. G. Wodehouse ===
In his first novel The Pothunters, (1902), P. G. Wodehouse references Ollendorf:

"Mr. Robert. Is he in?" It seemed to Charteris that the form of this question smacked of Ollendorf. He half expected the servant to say "No, but he has the mackintosh of his brother's cousin."

He later references his repetitive phrases in his novella The Swoop! (1909):

"Did you put that paper on this looking-glass?" he shouted.

"I did not put that paper on that looking-glass," replied Clarence precisely.

"Ah," said the Grand Duke, "if you had, I'd have come and wrung your neck like a chicken, and scattered you to the four corners of this dressing-room."

"I'm glad I didn't," said Clarence.

"Have you read this paper on the looking-glass?"

"I have not read that paper on the looking-glass," replied Clarence, whose chief fault as a conversationalist was that he was perhaps a shade too Ollendorfian.

== Bibliography ==
=== Target language: English ===
- Nouvelle méthode pour apprendre à lire, à écrire et à parler une langue en six mois, appliquée à l’anglais, 1847; Paris: Ollendorff, 1872.
- Clef de la nouvelle méthode appliquée à l’anglais.
- Nuevo metodo para aprender a leer, escribir y hablar una lengua en seis mesos, aplicado al inglés.
- Llave del nuevo metodo aplicado al inglés.
- Nuovo metodo per impararo a leggere, scrivere e parlare una lingua in soi mesi, applicato all’ ingleso.
- Chiave del nuovo metodo applicato all’ inglese.
- Olendorf's Methode zikh Grindlikh Oystsulernen di Englishe Shprakh ohn a Lehrer/ Ollendorff's Method to Acquire a Thorough Knowledge of the English Language Without the Aid of a Teacher Together with: Shliser tsu di Oyfgaben fir Ayberzetsung in Olsnedorf's Methode tsu Lerne English/ Key to the Exercises of Ollendorff's Method, New York: Hebrew Publishing Company, 1910.

=== Target language: French ===
- Nuevo metodo para aprender a leer, escribir y hablar una lengua en seis meses, aplicado al francés.
- Llave del nuevo metodo aplicado al francés.
- Nuovo metodo perimparare a leggere, scrivero e parlare una lingua in sei niesi, applicato al francese.
- Chiave del nuovo metodo applicato al francese.

=== Target language: German ===
- Nouvelle méthode pour apprendre à lire, à écrire et à parler une langue en six mois, appliquée à l’allemand, self published, 1836; Paris, Ollendorff, 1872.
- Clef de la méthode d’allemand, ou Corrigé des thèmes.
- Introduction à la méthode d’allemand, ou Déclinaison allemande déterminée; accompagnée d’un traité sur le genre des substantifs, 1882.

=== Target language: Italian ===
- Nouvelle méthode pour apprendre à lire, à écrire et à parler une langue en six mois, appliquée à l’italien, 1850.
- Clef de la nouvelle méthode appliquée à l’italien.
- A new method of learning to read, write, and speak, a language in six months adapted to the Italian: for the use of schools and private teachers, Frankfurt am Main: Charles (Carl) Jügel, at the German and Foreign Library, 1847.

=== Target language: Latin ===
- Nouvelle méthode pour apprendre à lire, à écrire et à parler une langue en six mois, appliquée au latin, 1869.
- Introduction à la méthode de latin, ou Déclinaison latine déterminée; accompagnée d’un traité sur le genre des substantifs.

=== Target language: Spanish ===
- Nouvelle méthode pour apprendre à lire, à écrire et à parler une langue en six mois, appliquée à l’espagnol.
- Clef de la nouvelle méthode appliquée à l’espagnol.

== Personal life ==
Ollendorff married Dorothea Pinkus after he established himself in Paris in 1830. They had three children: Gustave, Minna and Paul. The latter would become a Paris bookseller and publisher. He was also known for his collaboration with the Karl Baedeker publishing house on the edition of the French-language travel guide editions before the First World War.
