= SS Adler =

Adler was the name of four ships of Argo Line, Germany

- SS Adler (1884), purchased from Norddeutscher Lloyd in 1887, sold in 1889.
- SS Adler (1900), in service 1900–38, sold to Italy
- SS Adler (1938), In service 1938–40, requisitioned by Kriegsmarine.
- SS Adler (1950), in service 1950–66, sold to the Philippines
