= Kosova Hora =

- Municipality
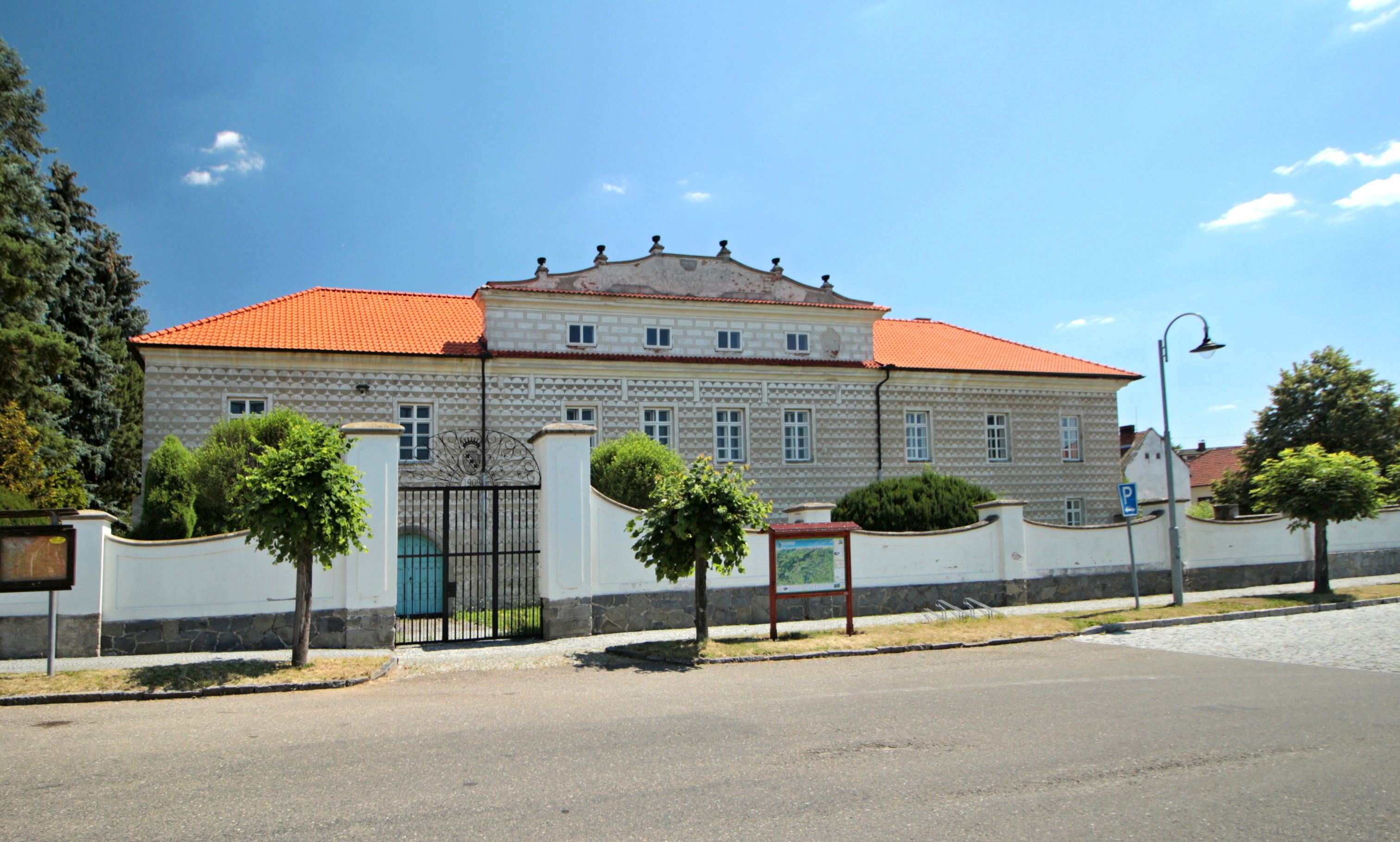
- Kosova Hora Castle

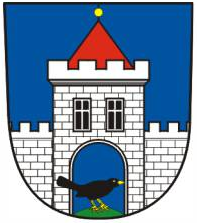
- Coat of arms

- Location in the Czech Republic
- Coordinates: 49°39′15″N 14°28′18″E
- Country: Czech Republic
- Region: Central Bohemian
- District: Příbram
- First mentioned: 1272

Area
  - Total: 18.77 km^{2} (7.25 sq mi)
- Elevation: 379 m (1,243 ft)

Population (2026-01-01)
  - Total: 1,350
  - Density: 71.9/km^{2} (186/sq mi)
- Time zone: UTC+1 (CET)
  - Summer (DST): UTC+2 (CEST)
- Postal codes: 262 91, 264 01
- Website: www.kosovahora.cz

Kosova Hora (German: Amschelberg) is a municipality and village in Příbram District in the Central Bohemian Region of the Czech Republic. It has about 1,400 inhabitants.

== Administrative division ==
Kosova Hora consists of eight municipal parts (in brackets population according to the 2021 census):

- Kosova Hora (1,061)
- Dobrohošť (2)
- Dohnalova Lhota (64)
- Janov (38)
- Lavičky (18)
- Lovčice (40)
- Přibýška (46)
- Vysoká (29)

== Etymology ==
The name Kosova Hora means "Kos's mountain" in Czech.

== Geography ==
Kosova Hora is located about 33 kilometres (21 mi) east of Příbram and 40 km (25 mi) south of Prague. Most of the municipality lies in the Benešov Uplands, the southeastern part of the municipal territory lies in the Vlašim Uplands. The highest point is a hill at 583 m (1,913 ft) above sea level. The Mastník River flows through the municipality.

== History ==
The first written mention of Kosova Hora is from 1272. From 1474 until the Battle of White Mountain in 1620, it was property of the Lords of Říčany. During their rule, Kosova Hora developed and prospered. Jewish community was established. Manufactories, ponds and a brewery were founded here. After the Battle of White Mountain, Kosova Hora was acquired by Albrecht von Wallenstein, who soon sold it to Sezima of Vrtba.

The 17th century was the most difficult period for Kosova Hora. The village was looted by the Swedish army in 1635, then it burned twice and suffered from plague and cholera epidemics. Kosova Hora recovered in the early 18th century. From the beginning of the 19th century until 1937, it was owned by the Mladota family.

== Demographics ==
Historical population

Year	Pop.	±%
1869	1,895	—
1880	1,746	−7.9%
1890	1,742	−0.2%
1900	1,653	−5.1%
1910	1,575	−4.7%

Year	Pop.	±%
1921	1,505	−4.4%
1930	1,305	−13.3%
1950	1,175	−10.0%
1961	1,251	+6.5%
1970	1,211	−3.2%

Year	Pop.	±%
1980	1,257	+3.8%
1991	1,285	+2.2%
2001	1,239	−3.6%
2011	1,271	+2.6%
2021	1,298	+2.1%

Source: Censuses

== Transport ==
The I/18 road (the section from Sedlčany to Votice) runs through the municipality.

== Sights ==
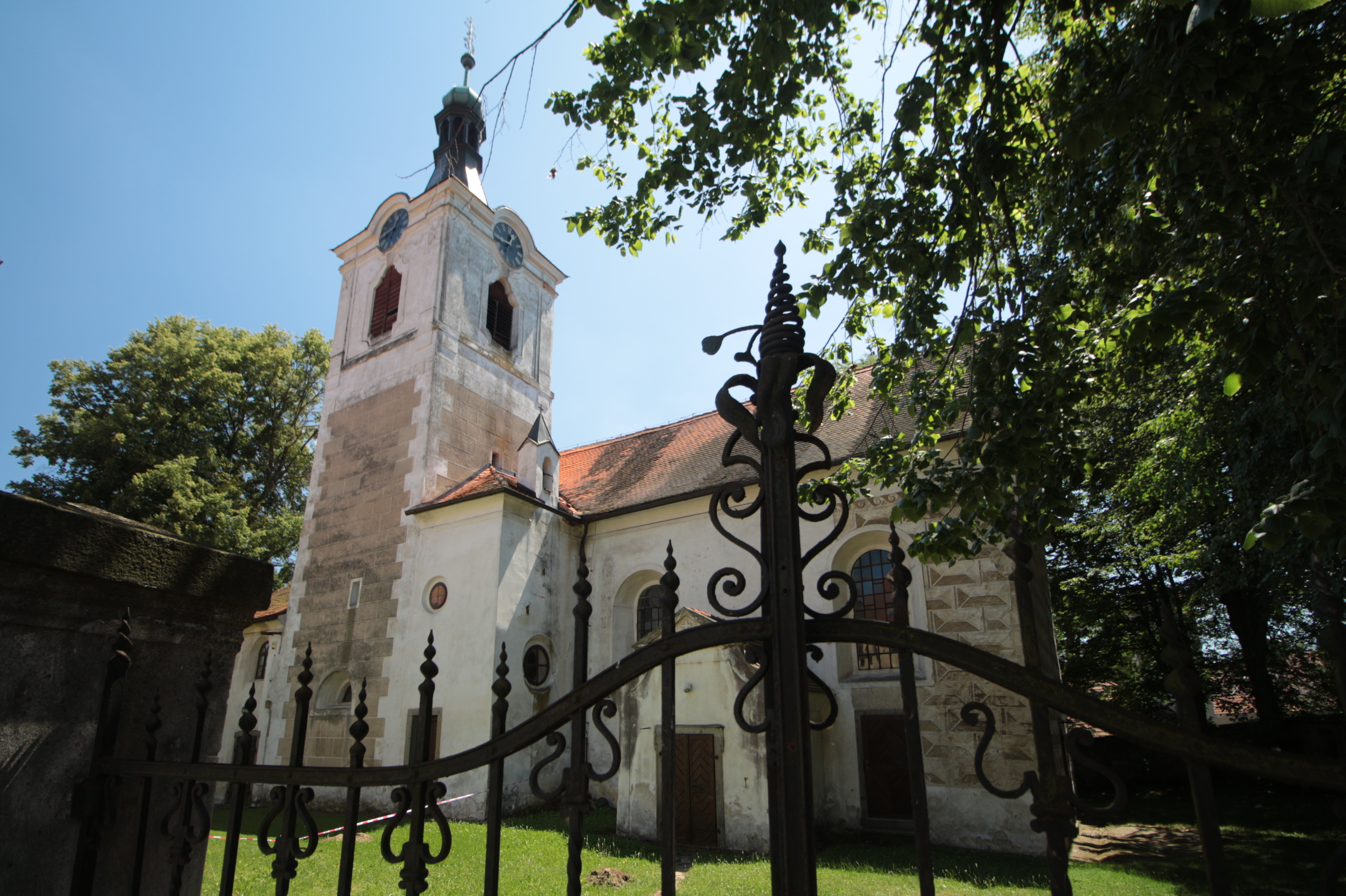
Church of Saint Bartholomew

The old fortress in Kosova Hora was rebuilt into a Renaissance castle at the beginning of the 17th century. It is decorated with sgraffiti. Today it is mainly used for residential purposes.

The Church of Saint Bartholomew is originally an early Gothic church, first mentioned in 1350. Renaissance modifications took place in the 16th century, from which the façade decorated with sgraffiti has survived. The church was then rebuilt in the Baroque style in 1761–1762, when the tower was raised. Further modifications were made in 1787.

== Notable people ==
- Friedrich Adler (1857–1938), Czech-Austrian jurist and writer
