= Adler Schwarzwald =

German meat company

Coordinates: 47°49′13.7″N 8°20′59.4″E

Adler Schwarzwald GmbH & Co. KG
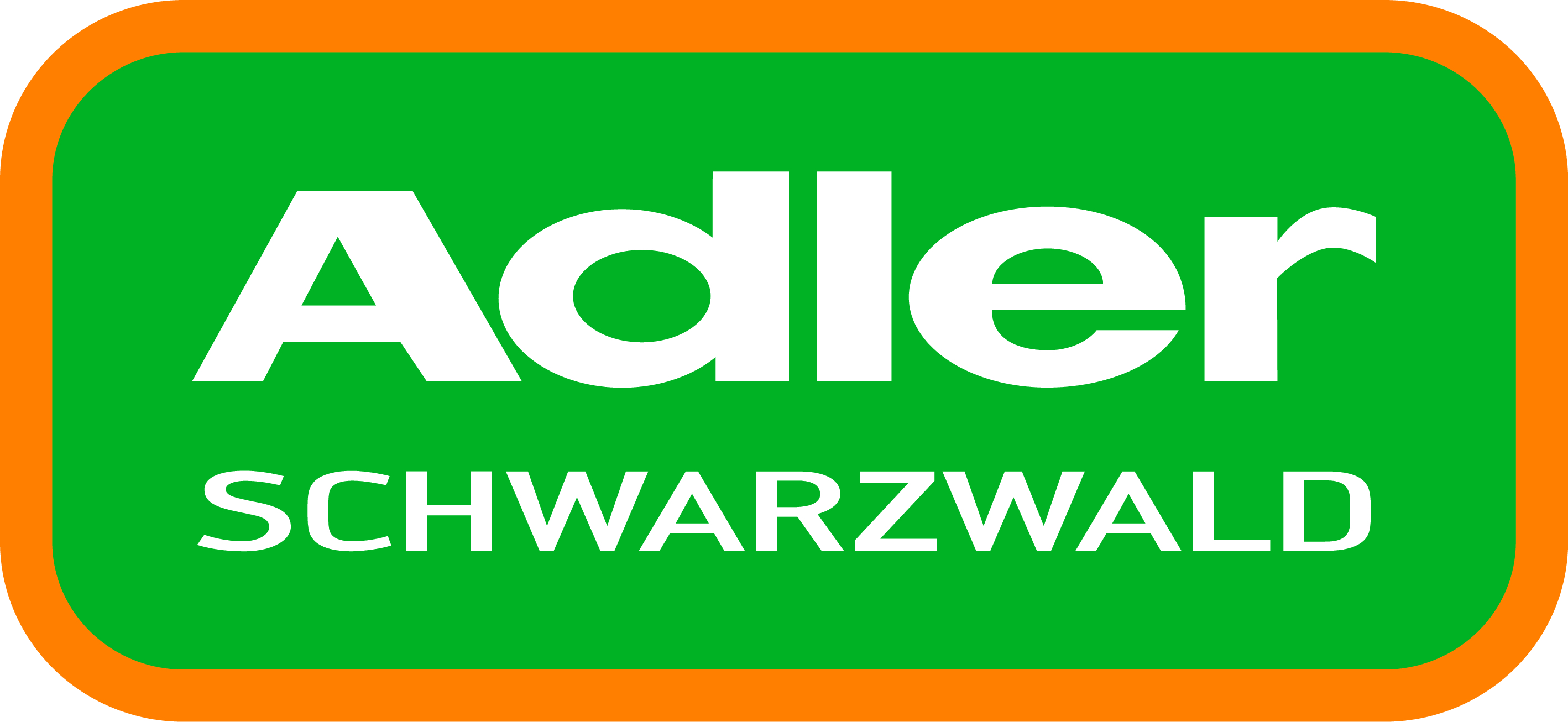
- Type: Family business
- Industry: Food industry
- Founded: 1964
- Headquarters: Bonndorf, Germany
- Products: Ham and Sausage Specialities
- Revenue: more than €100 million (2011)
- Number of employees: 320
- Website: Official website

Adler Schwarzwald GmbH & Co. KG (formerly Hans Adler OHG, Hans Adler Schwarzwälder Fleischwarenfabrik) is a family-owned business based in the Black Forest town of Bonndorf. Since 1920 Adler has been manufacturing selected Black Forest sausage and ham specialities. Adler Schwarzwald is one of the largest meat processing companies in the south-western German state of Baden-Württemberg and a founding member of the Association of the Black Forest Ham Manufacturers (Schutzverband der Schwarzwälder Schinkenhersteller).

== History ==
In 1920 Michael and Margarethe Adler took over the former Hugel Inn and the butchery in Lindenstraße in Bonndorf. Due to the construction of the dam at the nearby Schluchsee reservoir in 1929 the sales volume increased as Adler catered the dining facility for the construction workers. From 1935 on Hans Adler, Michael and Margarethe’s son, and his wife ran the business and extended the range of products. Adler began to distribute its canned products, e.g. the well-known Bonndorfer Würstchen (Bonndorfer Sausages). In the 1950s the company started to sell Black Forest smoked specialities via mail order. In 1959 Hans Adler pioneered manufacturing and selling Original Black Forest ham by retail and mail order. The inn was closed in 1963, Adler erected an abattoir and meat cutting on the present-day company premises. In the following year Hans Adler OHG Schwarzwälder Fleischwaren was founded, Hans Adler’s son Peter became co-partner and systematically promoted the production of smoked products. Hans Adler retired in 1974 and the son Hansjörg joined the family-owned company as a partner. In 1975 the first portion of sliced Black Forest ham left the production line in self-service packaging. Also in this year an air-cured ham called Alemannian ham was added to the product range. In 1985 Adler acquired Kinzigtäler Fleischwaren GmbH, Haslach and Schwarzwaldrauch GmbH, Achern, which subsequently were renamed to Schwarzwaldfleisch GmbH. Since 1994 the specialization on ham products was further promoted by building up a pure ham business in Achern and by founding Schinkenhof GmbH & Co. KG. From the end of the 1990s Adler continually extended its product range, different traditional types of Wurstsalat are distributed under the brand Schnelle Küche. Adler also produces regional specialities like Landjäger and Schäufele. In 2010 Schwarzwaldfleisch introduced the brand name SchwarzwaldArt for Adler specialities and gifts.
