= Valerie Adler =

South African artist

- Born: 1938 (age 87–88); South Africa
- Education: Inchbald School of Design Hebrew University of Jerusalem Chelsea School of Art
- Occupation: Artist

Valerie Adler is a South African-born painter and designer.

== Biography ==
Valerie Adler was born 1938 in South Africa and moved to England at the age of seventeen to study interior design at the Inchbald School of Design. In 1977, after twelve years in Britain, Adler moved to Israel. There she studied the history of art at the Hebrew University of Jerusalem. She also took drawing lessons from Asher Rodnitsky. In 1982 Adler returned to London to study at the Chelsea School of Art. She returned to Israel in the early 1990s.

Adler had her first solo exhibition at the Galleria Spazia Nuovo in Venice during 1986. The following year she had an exhibition at the Soloman Gallery in London and in 1989 she had exhibitions at both the Julius Gottlieb Gallery and at Carmel College in Wellingford. The Artspace Gallery in Jerusalem hosted an exhibition of Adler's work in 1995. The Ben Uri Gallery in London holds examples of her work.
