= MV Wickenburgh =

Merchant ship (1938–1984)

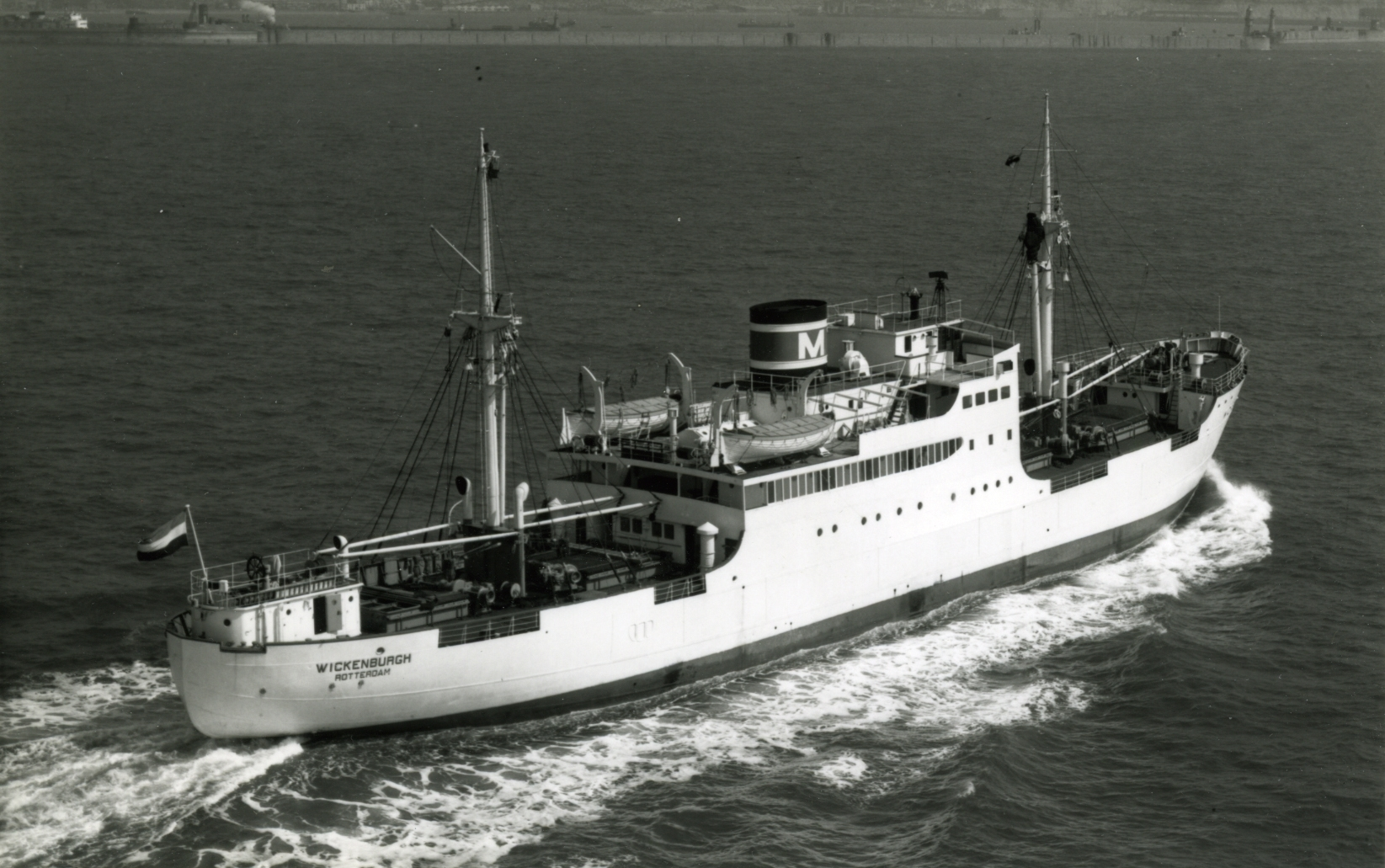
- MV Wickenburgh

History
- Name: Adler (1938–45); Empire Coningsby (1945–46); Margeca (1946–47); Wickenburgh (1947–63); Nissos Thassos (1963–70); Savilco (1970–84)
- Owner: Argo Reederei Richard Adler & Co (1938–40); Kriegsmarine (1940–45); Ministry of War Transport (1945); Ministry of Transport (1945–46); Dutch Government (1946–47); Wm H Muller & Co (1947–63); F C Georgopoulos (1963–70); Scandinavia-Baltic-Mediterranean Shipping Co (1970–78); Pythagoras Compagnia Navigacion (1978–84)
- Operator: Argo Reederei Richard Adler & Co (1938–40); Kriegsmarine (1940–45); General Steam Navigation Co Ltd (1945–46); Wm H Muller & Co NV (1946–63); F C Georgopoulos (1963–70); Scandinavia-Baltic-Mediterranean Shipping Co (1970–78); Pythagoras Compagnia Navigacion (1978–84)
- Port of registry: (Nazi Germany) Bremen (1938–40); (Nazi Germany) Kriegsmarine (1940–45); (United Kingdom) London (1945–46); (Netherlands) The Hague (1946–47); (Netherlands) Rotterdam (1947–63); Greece (1963–78); Panama City (1978–84)
- Builder: Lübecker Maschinenbau Gesellschaft
- Yard number: 369
- Launched: 1938
- Identification: call sign DOTX (1938–45); call sign GNMM (1945–46); UK official number 180702 (1945–46); IMO number: 5407461 ( –1984)
- Fate: Broken up
- Notes: Sister ships: Fasan, Möwe, Habicht, Schwan

General characteristics
- Type: Cargo liner
- Tonnage: 1,494 GRT (1938–53); 1,420 GRT (1953–84); 702 NRT (1938–53)
- Length: 249.2 ft (76.0 m)
- Beam: 39.6 ft (12.1 m)
- Depth: 12.2 ft (3.7 m)
- Installed power: 1 × compound steam engine + low-pressure steam turbine; 240 NHP (1938–53); 1 × diesel engine (1953–84)
- Propulsion: 1 × screw propeller

Wickenburgh was a cargo liner that was built in 1938 as Adler by Lübecker Maschinenbau Gesellschaft, Lübeck for German owners. Requisitioned by the Kriegsmarine in 1940, she was seized by the Allies in Vordingborg, Denmark in May 1945, passed to the Ministry of War Transport (MoWT) and renamed Empire Coningsby. In 1946, she was transferred to the Dutch Government and renamed Margeca. In 1947 she was sold into merchant service and renamed Wickenburgh. In 1953 her compound steam engine and low-pressure steam turbine were replaced with a diesel engine, with a reduction in gross register tonnage from 1,494 to 1,420. She was sold to Greek owners in 1963 and renamed Nissos Thassos. In 1970 she was sold to Panamanian owners and renamed Savilco. She was scrapped in 1984.

== Sister ships ==
Adler was one of a series of sister ships that Argo Line had built in the late 1930s. In 1936 Howaldtswerke built Fasan ("Pheasant") and Nordseewerke in Emden built Möwe ("Seagull"). In 1938 Nordseewerke built Habicht ("Hawk"), Howardtswerke built Schwan ("Swan") and Lübecker Maschinenbau Gesellschaft built Adler ("Eagle").

== Description ==
Lübecker Maschinenbau Gesellschaft, Lübeck built the ship in 1938 as yard number 369.

Her registered length was 249.2 ft (76.0 m), her beam was 39.6 ft (12.1 m) and her depth was 12.2 ft (3.7 m). As built, her tonnages were 1,494 GRT and 702 NRT.

Each of Adler's sisters was built with a two-cylinder compound steam engine plus a Bauer-Wach low-pressure steam turbine. Adler also had a Bauer-Wach turbine, but differed from her sisters by being built with a more powerful four-cylinder compound engine. It had a stroke of 35 7/16 inches (90.0 cm). Its two high-pressure cylinders had a bore of 17 11/16 inches (44.9 cm) and its two low-pressure cylinders had a bore of 35 7/16 inches (90.0 cm). Deutsche Schiff- und Maschinenbau GmbH, Bremen built the engine.

== History ==
Adler was built for Argo Reederei Richard Adler & Co, Bremen. She was registered in Bremen and her call sign was DOTX. She had a passenger certificate.

In 1940 the Kriegsmarine requisitioned Adler. She was used to transport the wounded between 14 August and the end of October 1944 and again from 6 March 1945 until World War II ended. In May 1945 the Allies seized her at Vordingborg, Denmark. She was passed to the MoWT and renamed Empire Coningsby Her port of registry was changed to London. She was given the United Kingdom official number 180702 and call sign GNMM. She was placed under the management of the General Steam Navigation Company.

Empire Coningsby was laid up at Hull. In 1946 she was transferred to the Dutch Government and renamed Margeca. Her port of registry was The Hague. She was placed under the management of Wm H Muller & Co NV, Rotterdam. In 1947 Margeca was sold to Muller and was renamed Wickenburgh. In 1953 NV Van Niehuis & van den Berg's Scheepsreparatiebedrijf, Pernis converted Wickenburgh to a motor ship with an MAN diesel engine. After conversion, Wickenburgh was 1,420 GRT.

In 1963 Wickenburgh was sold to FC Georgopoulos, Greece and renamed Nissos Thassos. With the introduction of IMO numbers, Nissos Thassos was given the number 5407461. In 1970 she was sold to Scandinavia-Baltic-Mediterranean Shipping Co, Greece and renamed Savilco. On 25 November 1977 she was laid up at Perama. In 1978 Savilco was sold to Pythagoras Compagnia Navigacion, Panama. She served for a further seven years until in April or May 1984 she was sold for scrap. Demolition began in October 1984 at Eleusis.
