= Johan Gunder Adler =

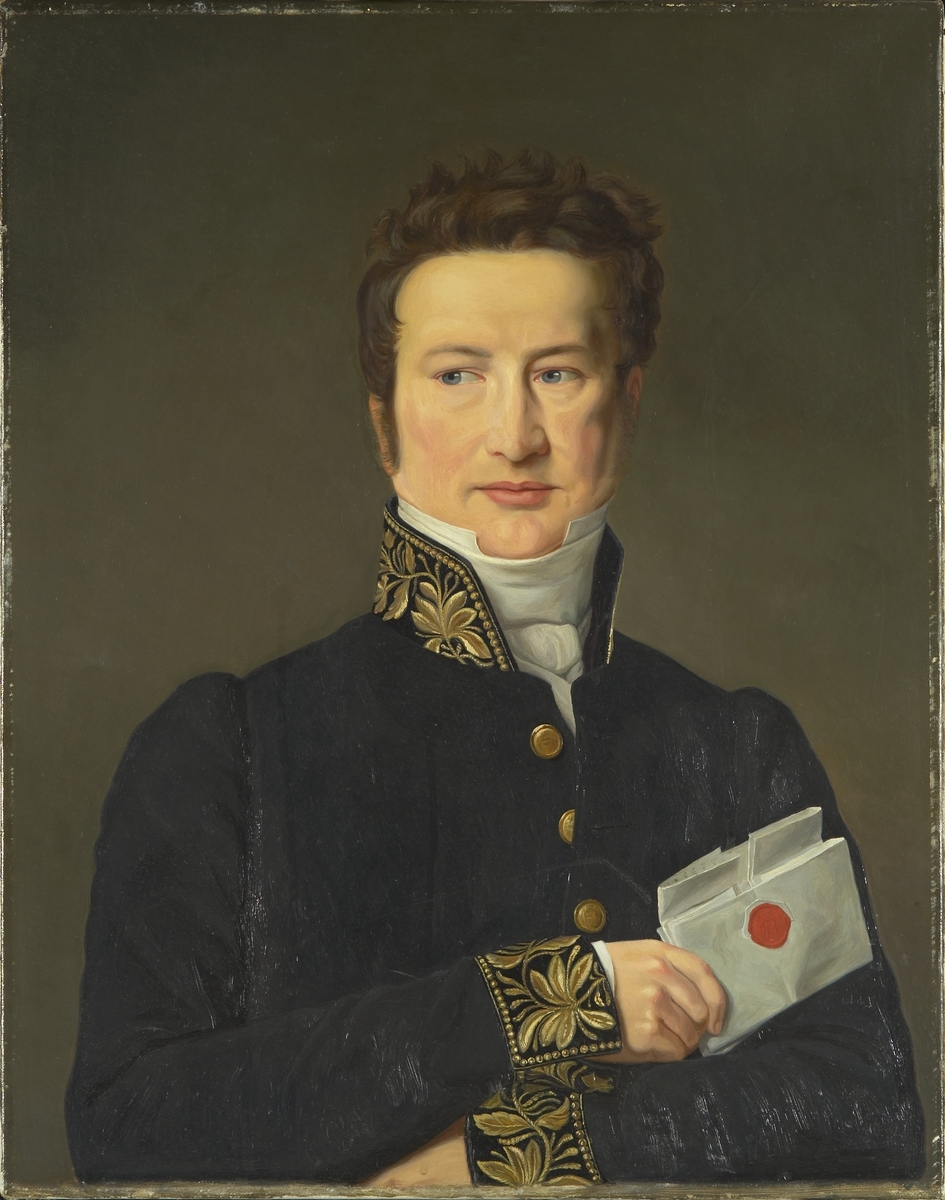
Johan Gunder Adler, painting by C.W. Eckersberg

Johan Gunder Adler (5 March 1784 – 26 May 1852) was a Danish civil servant and a co-author of the Constitution of Norway.

Johan Gunder Adler was born and raised in Copenhagen, Denmark. He studied at the University of Copenhagen in 1803–1804. He then worked in Copenhagen as a teacher and later head of Prinds Christian Augusts Minde, a school in Frederiksted, now Halden in Østfold, Norway.

Adler was present at Eidsvold as assistant and cabinet secretary of Crown Prince Christian Frederik of Denmark who was a proposed King of Norway. When Christian Frederik relinquished the throne and returned to Denmark in late autumn 1814, Adler followed with him. In 1815 Christian Frederik was appointed governor of Funen and Adler became a member of his staff. After King Frederik VI of Denmark died in 1839, Christian Frederik ascended the throne as King Christian VIII of Denmark. Adler was appointed cabinet secretary, a position he held until King Christian died in 1848.

== Background ==
Adler was the son of the governor Adolf Adler and his spouse Ingeborg f. Lund. He studied at the University of Copenhagen in 1803–1804. During the Battle of Copenhagen in 1807 he served in the King's Livjægerkorps. Then he worked for a few years in Copenhagen until he took over the position of director of the school "Christian August's Memorial" in Frederikshald - present Halden - in 1812. He taught in French, German, History, Mathematics and English. Stattholder Christian Frederik shall have visited the school in Halden while Adler taught there.
