= Jens Adler =

German footballer (born 1965)

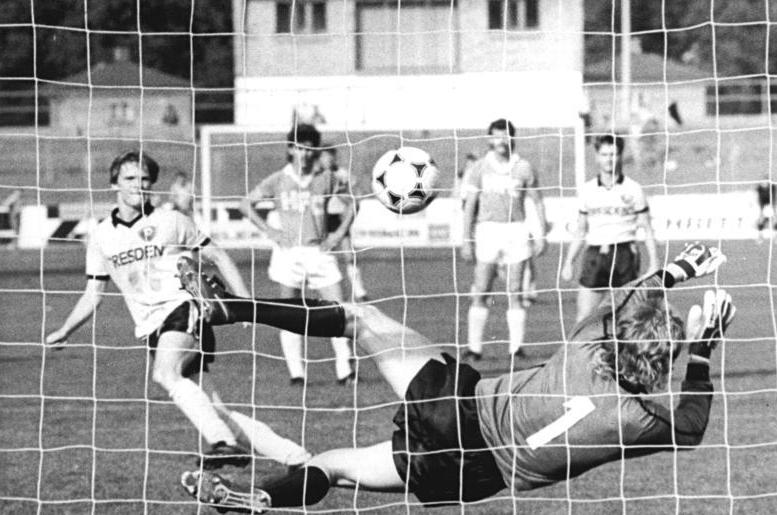
- Adler saves a penalty kick from Dynamo Dresden's Karsten Neitzel

Personal information
- Date of birth: 25 April 1965 (age 61)
- Place of birth: Halle, Bezirk Halle, East Germany
- Height: 1.82 m (6 ft 0 in)
- Position: Goalkeeper

Team information
- Current team: Hallescher FC (goalkeeper coach)

Youth career
- 1974–1983: Chemie Halle

Senior career*
Years	Team	Apps	(Gls)
1983–1993	Hallescher FC (Note: Hallescher FC were known as Chemie Halle until 1991)	200	(0)
1994–1995	Stahl Brandenburg	28	(0)
1995–1997	Hertha BSC	1	(0)
1997–2000	VfL Halle 96	73	(0)

International career
1990	East Germany	1	(0)

Managerial career
- 2001–2008: Hallescher FC (goalkeeper coach)
- 2012–2016: Hallescher FC (goalkeeper coach)
- * Club domestic league appearances and goals

Jens Adler (born 25 April 1965) is a German former footballer who played as a goalkeeper.

His sole international appearance came for East Germany in the national team's last match on 12 September 1990. He came on to replace Jens Schmidt as a late substitute in a 2–0 away win over Belgium, although he never touched the ball. As a result, he became the last man to win a cap for East Germany.

Adler played for Hallescher FC for eleven seasons, either side of German reunification. In 1995, he moved to Hertha BSC, but played very little, where his only senior appearance saw him come on as a substitute for Christian Fiedler in a match against KFC Uerdingen 05. After two seasons he returned to Halle, this time to sign for VfL Halle 1896. He retired from football in 2000 and returned to Hallescher FC to serve as goalkeeper coach.
