= Edoardo Mascheroni =

Italian composer and conductor

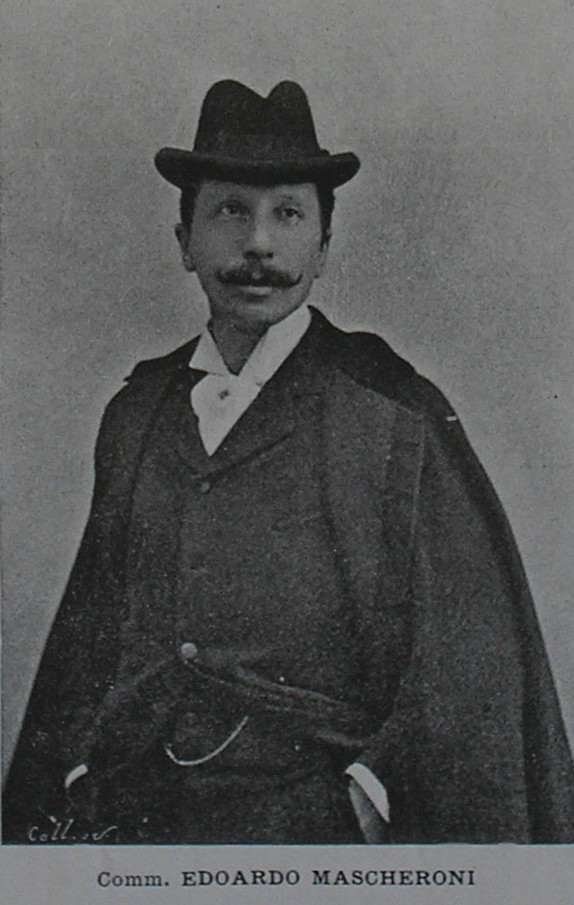
Edoardo Mascheroni, 1895

Edoardo Mascheroni (4 September 1852 in Milan, Austrian Empire – 4 March 1941 in Valganna) was an Italian composer and conductor. He is remembered for conducting the world premiere of Giuseppe Verdi's Falstaff; he also composed two operas of his own, to libretti by Luigi Illica. His brother Angelo was also a composer.

== Sources ==
- His operas at italianopera.org
