= Friedrich Adler (writer) =

Czech attorney, poet and translator

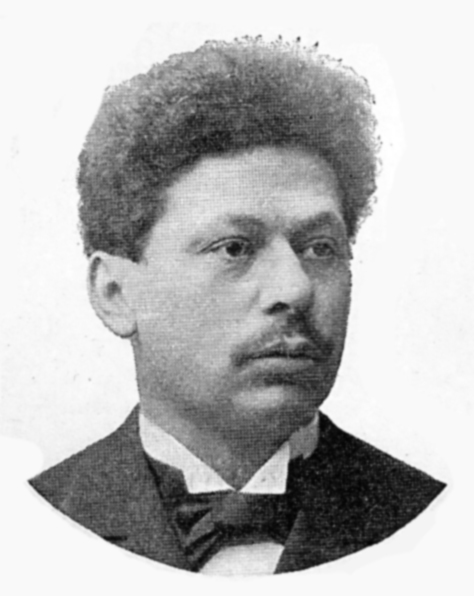
Friedrich Adler

Friedrich Adler (13 February 1857 – 2 February 1938) was a Czech-Austrian jurist, translator, and writer of Jewish origin, writing in the German language.

== Biography ==
Friedrich Adler was born in Kosova Hora. He was the son of innkeeper and soaper Joseph Adler, and his wife Marie Fürth. After his parents' deaths (probably in 1866), Adler was only able to attend school in Amschelberg irregularly. Despite this, he was admitted to a gymnasium in Prague, and to the Karl-Ferdinands University in Prague.

There, he studied Romance Languages, English, Czech, and Modern Greek. He later changed subjects and studied law and politics. During his studies, Adler received an award for his translation of a poem by Henry Wadsworth Longfellow in a competition. He finished his studies in 1883 with a doctorate in law.

After his studies he completed a legal clerkship in 1890. In the same year he was licensed to become a lawyer and opened a law office on 1 January 1891 in Prague. In March 1895 he married Regine Wessely from Třebíč, Moravia. They had two daughters: Marie-Elise and Gertrude.

In 1896, Adler became the secretary of the Prague trade body (a position he held until the start of World War I). He was also a lecturer for Romance philology at the German University in Prague and arts and theatre correspondent for the newspaper Bohemia. From 1900 he taught Spanish at the German trade academy in Prague.

After the First World War, Adler headed the translation department of the Czech National Assembly. He was elected a member of the Society for the Promotion of German Sciences, Arts and Literature in Bohemia and was a prominent figure of the Prague literature scene at the turn of the century, alongside Hugo Salus. He was a member of the patriotic-liberal oriented German artists society Concordia, which met in the "Deutscher Casino"; in addition to himself and Salus, the society included writers of the Bohemia. Adler corresponded with Richard Dehmel and Gustav Falke, amongst others.

Friedrich Adler died at the age of 81 on 2 February 1938 in Prague. His family were victims of the Nazi regime: Regine Adler was murdered in 1943 in the Theresienstadt concentration camp, the path of his daughter could only be traced up to 1943 in Zamość, Poland.

He is buried at the New Jewish Cemetery in Smíchov, Prague.
