= Regina Kapeller-Adler =

Austrian-British biochemist and pharmacologist

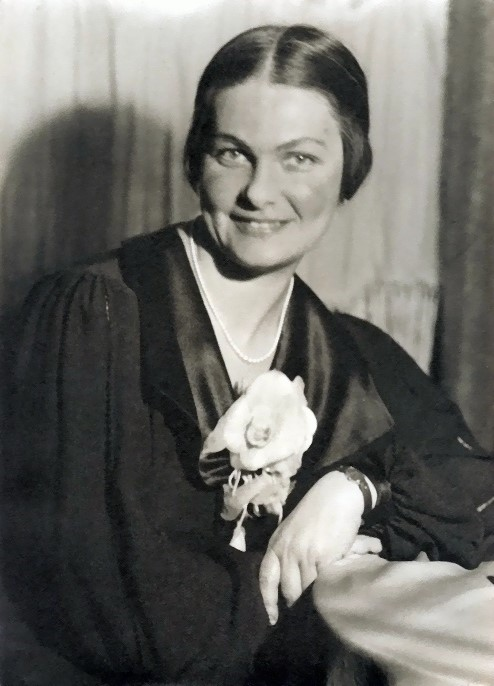
- Regina Kapeller-Adler in 1930
- Born: Regina Kapeller; 28 June 1900; Stanislau, Galicia and Lodomeria, Austria-Hungary
- Died: 31 July 1991 (aged 91); Edinburgh, Scotland
- Education: University of Vienna; University of Edinburgh
- Occupation: Biochemist
- Known for: Kapeller-Adler pregnancy test

Regina Kapeller-Adler, born Regina Kapeller, (28 June 1900 – 31 July 1991) was an Austrian biochemist who, in 1934, devised an innovative test for early pregnancy based on the detection of histidine in urine. As a Jew, she was forced to leave Austria following the country's annexation into Nazi Germany in the Anschluss and went to work with the noted geneticist Francis Crew at the Institute of Animal Genetics at the University of Edinburgh.

She worked at the Edinburgh Royal Infirmary during the Second World War and subsequently joined the pharmacology department of the University of Edinburgh and worked as a lecturer in chemistry. Towards the end of her career, she worked in obstetrics and gynaecology. In 1973, she received the Golden Honorary Diploma, an honorary degree of the University of Vienna, which was presented to her by Austrian biochemist Hans Tuppy.

== Early life ==
Regina Kapeller was born on 28 June 1900 in Stanislau (now Ivano-Frankivsk), Galicia, Austria-Hungary. Her father, Moritz Kapeller, was employed by the Canadian Pacific and Royal Mail Lines. Her early education was at a school in Brody, Lviv.

In 1928, Regina Kapeller married Dr Ernst Adler (1899–1970) and they had a daughter, Liselotte Adler (later Mrs Kastner) in 1934.

== Career ==
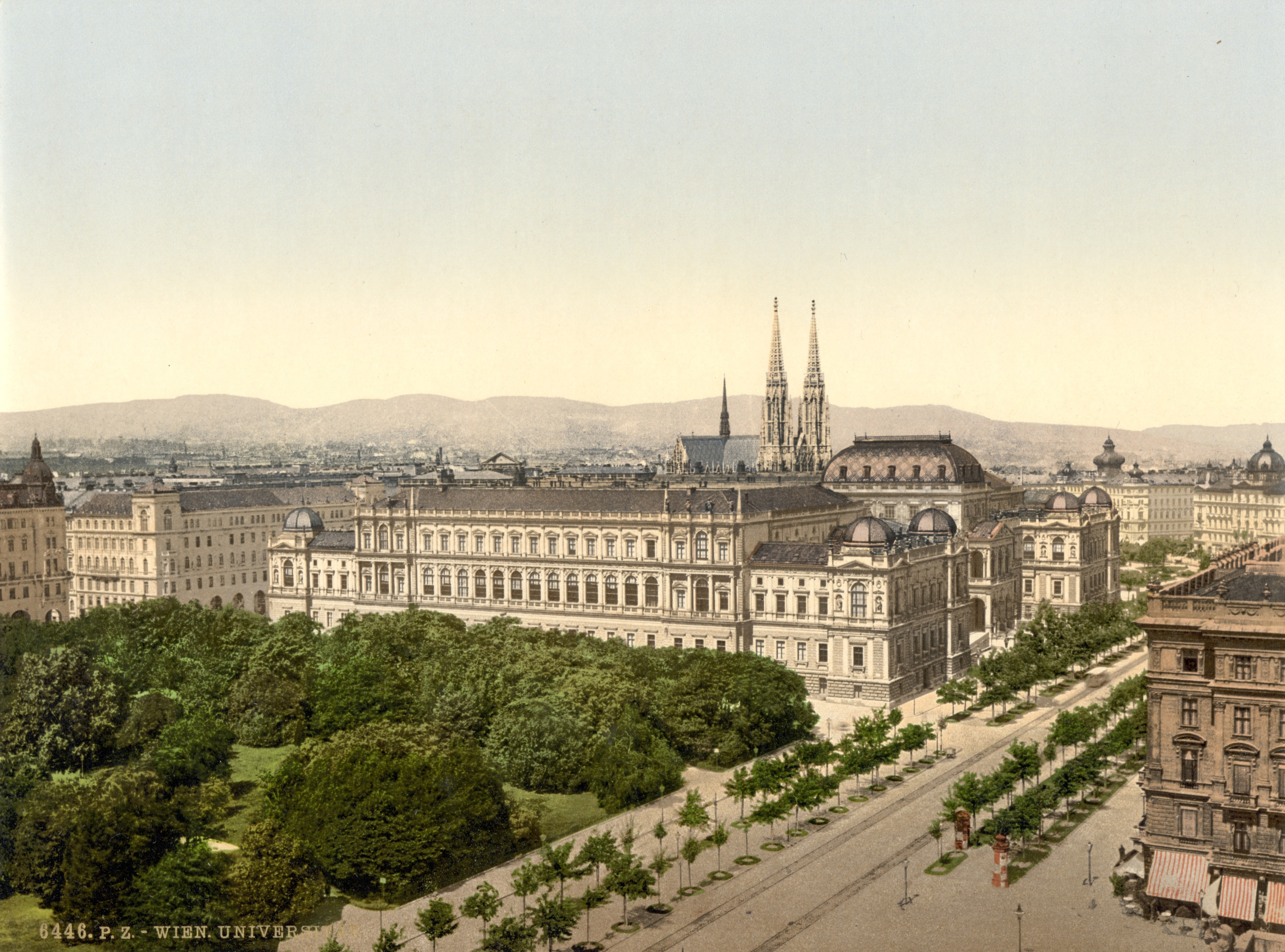
University of Vienna, c. 1900

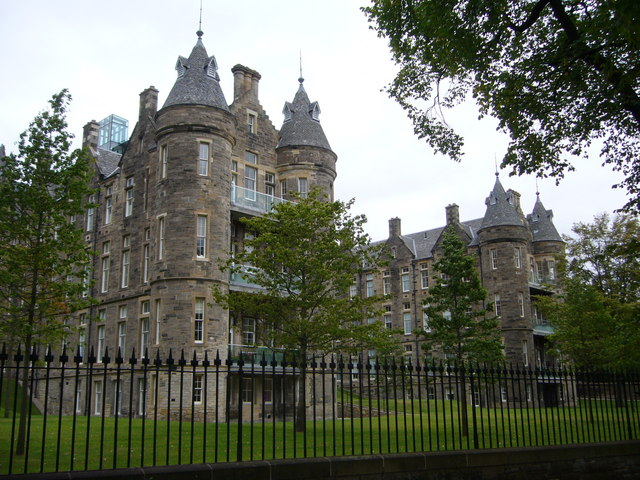
Former buildings of the Edinburgh Royal Infirmary

Kapeller-Adler obtained her doctorate in chemistry from the University of Vienna in 1923 and became a demonstrator at the Institute for Medical Chemistry of the University of Vienna in 1926. She was discouraged from pursuing a habilitation because she was a woman and Jewish, and worked unpaid. In 1934, she developed an innovative chemical test for early pregnancy using the detection of histidine excretion in urine that gained her international recognition.

Kapeller-Adler began to study for a medical degree at the University of Vienna in 1934 while working part-time at the Biochemical Laboratory of the Health Insurance Fund from 1935 to 1936. Between 1936 and 1937, she was head of the Laboratory for Clinical and Medical-Chemical Diagnostics of the Sanatoriums Hera in Vienna.

After the Anschluss in 1938, during which Nazi Germany annexed Austria, Kapeller-Adler and her husband lost their jobs due to being Jewish, and were unable to complete their studies at the university. In 1939, she moved to Edinburgh, Scotland, on the invitation of the English geneticist Francis Crew to work at the Institute of Animal Genetics at the University of Edinburgh, then the only pregnancy diagnosis centre in the United Kingdom. Her husband travelled with her and was briefly interned as an "enemy alien" before being released and starting a medical practice in Edinburgh in 1943.

Kapeller-Adler was awarded the degree of Doctor of Science by the University of Edinburgh in 1941. She worked at the Edinburgh Royal Infirmary from 1940 to 1944. Subsequently, she joined the pharmacology department of the University of Edinburgh and worked as a lecturer in chemistry from 1951 to 1964. Starting in 1968, she worked locally in obstetrics and gynaecology. In 1973, she received the Golden Honorary Diploma, an honorary degree from the University of Vienna, presented to her by Austrian biochemist Hans Tuppy.

== Death and legacy ==
Kapeller-Adler died in Edinburgh on 31 July 1991 at the age of 91.

== Selected publications ==
- "Urinary Histidine in the Diagnosis of Pregnancy", JAMA, 27 June 1936, doi:10.1001/jama.1936.02770260034012, pp. 2240–2241.
- Amine Oxidases and Methods for their Study. Wiley-Interscience, New York & London, 1970.
