= Oliver Adler =

German footballer

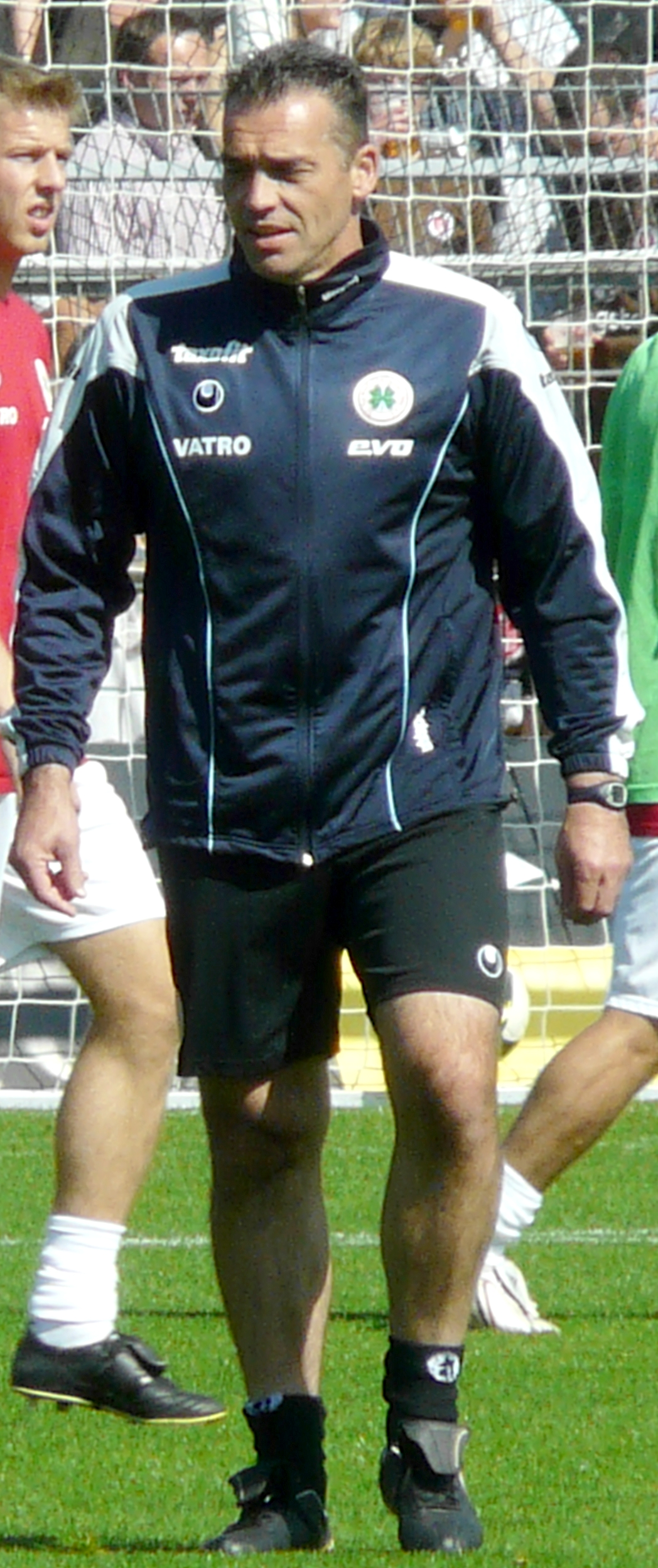
- Adler in 2008

Personal information
- Date of birth: 14 October 1967 (age 59)
- Place of birth: Duisburg
- Height: 1.89 m (6 ft 2 in)
- Position: Goalkeeper

Senior career*
Years	Team	Apps	(Gls)
1984–1990	Duisburger FV 08		
1990–1992	Schwarz-Weiß Essen		
1992–1994	Duisburger FV 08		
1994–1995	Preußen Köln		
1995–2005	Rot-Weiß Oberhausen		
2005–2008	KSV Hessen Kassel		

Managerial career
- 2008–2012: Rot-Weiß Oberhausen (assistant)
- * Club domestic league appearances and goals

Oliver Adler (born 14 October 1967) is a German former professional footballer who played as a goalkeeper.
