= SS Rhineland =

1,312 GRT cargo steamship

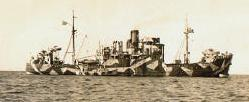
- Sperrbrecher 131

History
- Name: Schwan (1938–39); VP-101 Schwan (1939–40); Sperrbrecher 31 (1940–41); Sperrbrecher 131 (1941–48); Weltonwold (1948–49); Rhineland (1949–56); Herrisbrook (1956–57); Inyoni (1957–62)
- Owner: Argo Line (1938–39); Kriegsmarine (1939–45); German Mine Sweeping Administration (1945–47); Atkinson & Pritchett (1947–48); Currie Line (1948–56); Smiths Coasters Pty Ltd (1956–62)
- Port of registry: (Nazi Germany) Bremen, Germany (1938–39); Kriegsmarine (1939–45); Germany (1945–47); (United Kingdom) Hull, UK (1947–48); (United Kingdom) Leith, UK (1948–57); (Union of South Africa) Durban, South Africa (1957–62)
- Yard number: 772
- Launched: 1938
- Completed: 1938
- Commissioned: 12 September 1939
- Decommissioned: 1947
- Identification: Call sign DOUN (1938– ); Pennant number VP-101 (1939–40); Call sign ZTML (1956–62)
- Fate: Scrapped 1962

General characteristics
- Tonnage: 1,311 GRT, 724 NRT
- Length: 74.7 m (245.2 ft)
- Beam: 11.6 m (38.2 ft)
- Depth: 3.8 m (12.4 ft)
- Decks: 2
- Installed power: 222 NHP
- Propulsion: 1 × compound steam engine + low-pressure steam turbine; 1 × screw propeller
- Sensors & processing systems: wireless direction finding; echo sounding device
- Notes: sister ships: Fasan, Möwe, Habicht, Adler

Rhineland was a 1,312 GRT cargo steamship that Howaldtswerke of Kiel, Germany built in 1938 for Argo Line, Bremen. She was requisitioned by the Kriegsmarine in 1939, and served as VP-101 Schwan, Sperrbrecher 31 and Sperrbrecher 131. She served post-war with the German Mine Sweeping Administration before being declared a prize and passed to British owners. She was renamed Weltonwold in 1948 and then Rhineland in 1949. She was sold to South African owners in 1956 and renamed Herrisbrook. She was renamed Inyoni in 1957 and scrapped in 1962.

== Sister ships ==
Schwan was one of a series of sister ships that Argo Line had built in the late 1930s. In 1936 Howaldtswerke built Fasan ("Pheasant") and Nordseewerke in Emden built Möwe ("Seagull"). In 1938 Nordseewerke built Habicht ("Hawk"), Howardtswerke built Schwan ("Swan") and Lübecker Maschinenbau Gesellschaft built Adler ("Eagle").

== Description ==
Schwan's registered length was 74.7 m (245.2 ft), her beam was 11.6 m (38.2 ft) and her depth was 3.8 m (12.4 ft). Her tonnages were 1,311 GRT and 724 NRT.

Like most of her sisters, Schwan was propelled by a two-cylinder compound steam engine plus a Bauer-Wach exhaust steam turbine. The reciprocating engine had a stroke of 90.0 centimetres (35 7/16 in). Its high-pressure cylinder had a bore of 45.2 centimetres (17 13/16 in) and its low-pressure cylinder had a bore of 90.0 centimetres (35 7/16 in). The exhaust turbine was coupled to the propeller shaft via an hydraulic coupling and double reduction gearing. Deschimag of Bremen, Germany built her engines. Her combined reciprocating and turbine machinery was rated at 222 NHP.

== History ==
Howaldtswerke of Kiel, Germany, built Schwan for Argo Line, Bremen. Argo Line registered her in Bremen. Her call sign was DOUN.

On 12 September 1939 she was commissioned into the Kriegsmarine as the vorpostenboot VP-101 Schwan, serving with 1 Vorpostenbootflottille. On 1 October 1940, she was transferred to 3 Sperrbrecherflottille and renamed Sperrbrecher 31. The ship swept for British magnetic mines through the Great Belt ahead of the German battleship Bismarck and her escorts at the beginning of her sortie into the Atlantic in May 1941 (Operation Rheinübung). She was renamed Sperrbrecher 131 on 15 July. Post-war, she served with the German Mine Sweeping Administration.

In 1947 Sperrbrecher 131 was declared a prize and passed to the UK. Laid up, she was sold to Atkinson & Pritchett, Hull, Yorkshire and renamed Weltonwold in December 1948, remaining laid up. Although reported as destroyed by a fire in 1949, she was repaired. She was sold to Currie Line, Leith, Lothian in 1949 and renamed Rhineland.

In 1956, Rhineland was sold to Smiths Coasters Pty Ltd, Durban, South Africa and was renamed Herrisbrook. She was renamed Inyoni in 1957. Her South African call sign was ZTML. She was scrapped at Durban in August 1962.

== Bibliography ==
- Grooss, Poul (2017). The Naval War in the Baltic 1939–1945. Barnsley, UK: Seaforth. ISBN 978-1-5267-0000-1.
- Rohwer, Jürgen (2005). Chronology of the War at Sea 1939–1945: The Naval History of World War Two (Third Revised ed.). Annapolis, Maryland: Naval Institute Press. ISBN 1-59114-119-2.
