= Adler Seeds =

American agricultural company

- Company type: Private
- Industry: Farming
- Founded: 1937
- Headquarters: Sharpsville, Indiana, USA
- Key people: Howard Adler (founder)
- Products: Corn Hybrids; Soybean Varieties; Wheat Varieties
- Revenue: ▲ Unknown NZD

Adler Seeds is an American company that was founded in 1937 by Howard Adler, in Sharpsville, Indiana. Adler Seeds was formerly known as George Adler & Sons until later when it was then incorporated and called Adler Seeds.

By 1993 Howard Alder had resigned and decided to pass on the company to John Adler, his son. In 2005, it merged with Kelley Farms.

Adler's developed JavaSoy in 2002, which is a soy/coffee blend that is marketed through their Adler Foods company.

After a fire at its seed facility, Adler Seeds sold its facility and farm ground to Beck's Hybrids, based in Atlanta, Indiana, in 2009. Beck's soon began to redevelop the facility and farmland into their Foundation Seed Facility. Adler's co-owner John Adler, son of founder Howard, then moved to Lafayette, Indiana and re-established Adler Seeds by joining with AgVenture. AgVenture is a "network of independently owned and operated regional seed companies".
