= Benjamin Adler =

American electrical engineer and inventor

- Born: 10 November 1903; New York City, U.S.
- Died: 16 April 1990 (aged 86)
- Education: New York University Tandon School of Engineering
- Occupation(s): Electrical engineer, inventor
- Known for: Developing the first commercial television set

Benjamin Adler (10 November 1903 – 16 April 1990) was an American electrical engineer and inventor who helped develop the first commercial television set. He was born in New York City to Romanian Jewish immigrants. He graduated from the-now New York University Tandon School of Engineering.
