= George J. Adler =

American linguist

- Born: 1821; Leipzig, Kingdom of Saxony
- Died: August 24, 1868 (aged 47); New York City, U.S.
- Resting place: Trinity Church Cemetery, New York City, U.S.
- Citizenship: United States (1833)
- Education: New York University (A.B.)
- Occupations: Author, philologist
- Employer: New York University
- Awards: Valedictorian (1844)

George J. Adler (1821, Leipzig, Kingdom of Saxony – August 24, 1868, New York, New York) was a philologist and linguist.

== Early years ==
Adler was born to John J. Adler and a mother whose name is unknown in Germany in 1821. He arrived in the United States in 1833, with his parents, who settled in New York city, where the boy attended the public schools and entered the university of the city of New York, from which he was graduated valedictorian in 1844. Two years later he became a professor of German language at New York University, which position he filled for eight years.

He prepared the Dictionary of German and English Languages, which was published in 1848, and a German grammar and other German text-books which followed, and which are acknowledged to be the best books yet published in America. In 1858, Adler completed his last important work, A Practical Grammar of the Latin Language. Both of these textbooks are in effect editions of the language textbooks of Heinrich Gottfried Ollendorff.

== Career ==
Regarding his important work on the Latin, Adler writes in the preface to the textbook: "The preparation of a text-book for the study of the Latin, similar to that edited by me, some twelve years ago, on the German, has since that time been repeatedly suggested to me … Years however elapsed before I could even think of entering on such a task, … partly because I felt, in common with many others, some hesitation to undertake the somewhat delicate part of treating a so-called dead language like a living organism … It was not until after I had completed what I considered myself bound to render, as professor of a modern language in the city of New York, that I could give the question a serious consideration."

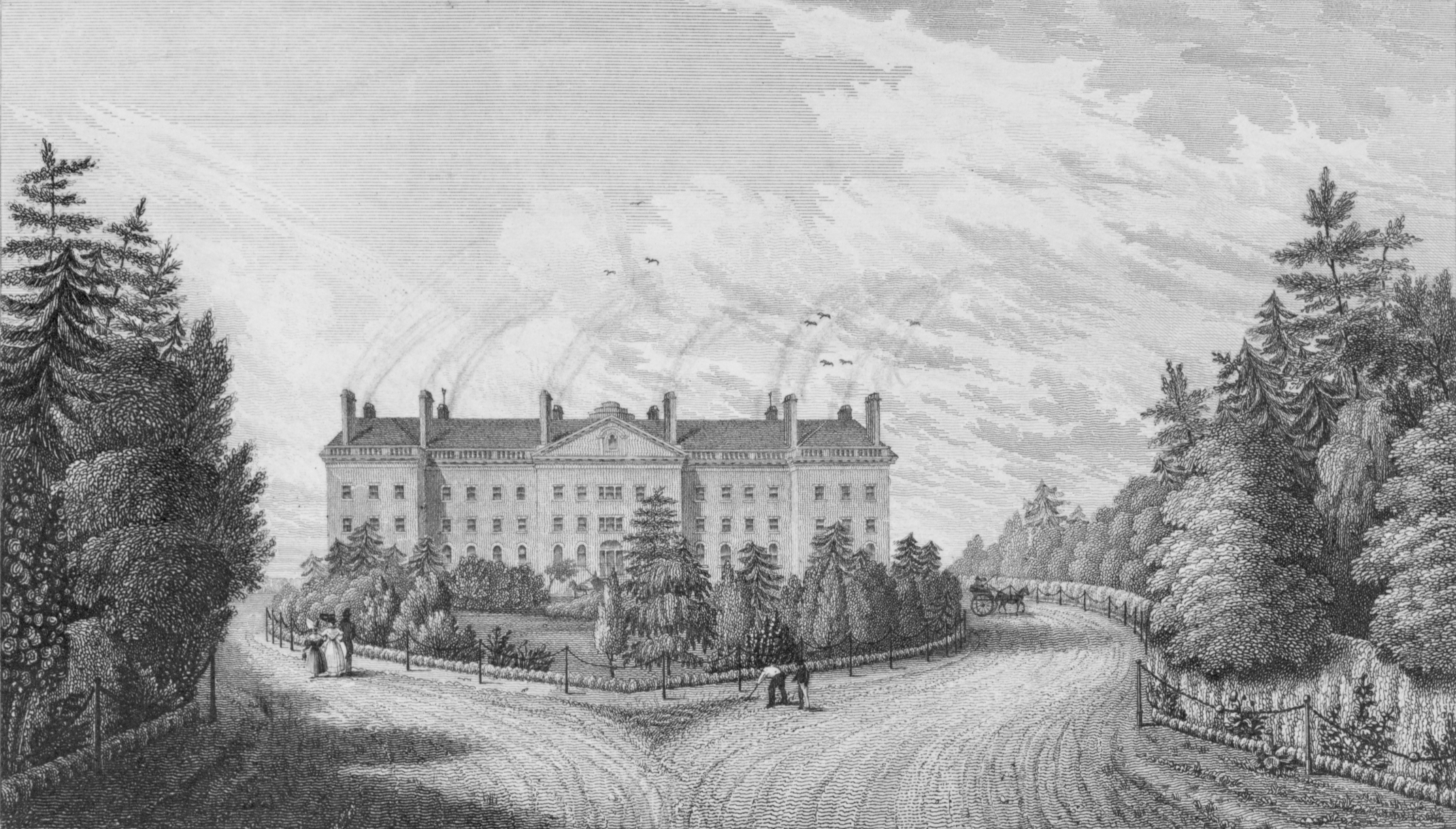
Bloomingdale Insane Asylum, Manhattanville, New York

Adler had been diagnosed as insane, reportedly due to the strain of publishing the dictionary. He became a resident of the Bloomingdale Asylum in upper Manhattan in 1853, remaining a semi-permanent resident of the facility until his death there in 1868. Adler is buried at Trinity Cemetery. He wrote a short tract about his insanity, called Letters of a Lunatic.

Adler was known to Herman Melville, whom he met on a sea journey to Europe in October 1849. This was shortly before Melville wrote Moby Dick. Melville wrote of that encounter: "He is author of a formidable lexicon (German and English); in compiling which he almost ruined his health. He was almost crazy, he tells me, for a time. He is full of the German metaphysics, and discourses of Kant, Swedenborg, etc."

Melville spent many hours talking to Adler, talking of "Fixed Fate, Free will, foreknowledge and the absolute", said Melville, "his philosophy is Coleredgian [sic], he accepts the scriptures as divine, and yet leaves himself free to inquire into nature. He does not take it that the Bible is absolutely infallible and that anything opposed to it in Science must be wrong. He believes that there are things out of God and independent [sic] of him – things that would have existed were there no God – such as that two and two make four; for it is not that God so decrees mathematically, but that in the very nature of things, the fact is thus."

Further, Leon Howard points out that Adler may well serve as the model for Bartleby in Melville's Bartleby, the Scrivener, a story of Wall Street.

"On 25 August Melville was excused from work for the funeral of George Adler, whose body was buried at the rapidly filling Trinity Cemetery, after a funeral at St. Michael's Church. Melville was one of only a handful of mourners at the funeral. When he was earning no money, in late 1859 or early 1860, and before Lizzie inherited money, Melville had subscribed for a copy of Adler's translation of a book on Provençal poetry – the test of friendship. Most of the intervening years Adler had remained confined at Bloomingdale's Asylum. Duyckinck was there at the funeral, riding from St. Michael's with the Dr. Houghton who was conducting part of the service. It was a sorry affair, a man of genius living in confinement and dying almost unmourned, Duyckinck recorded in a letter to his son George. "Herman Melville, [F. W.] Downer with me & two others were at the funeral, and Dr. [D. Tilden] Brown of the asylum in whose face and mien you may read the secret of Adler's regard for him." At least the staff physician had been one of the mourners."

== Last years ==
His mind became impaired during the last years of his life, and he died at Bloomingdale asylum of New York City, on August 24, 1868.
