= Anders Adler =

Swedish ice hockey player

- Born: February 6, 1982 (age 43) Stockholm, Sweden
- Height: 1.80 m (5 ft 11 in)
- Weight: 90 kg (198 lb; 14 st 2 lb)
- Position: Defence
- Shot: Left
- Played for: Huddinge IK; Trångsunds IF; Tullinge TP; Grantorps AIK; Arken HC
- NHL draft: Undrafted
- Playing career: 2002–2023

Anders Adler (born February 6, 1982) is a Swedish former professional ice hockey defenceman. Adler most recently played with Tullinge TP in the Swedish League III during the 2010-11 season.

== Career statistics ==
			Regular season					Playoffs
Season	Team	League	GP	G	A	Pts	PIM	GP	G	A	Pts	PIM
1999–00	Huddinge IK J18	J18 Allsvenskan	14	4	4	8	24	5	0	0	0	2
2000–01	Huddinge IK J20	J20 SuperElit	21	1	2	3	12	2	0	0	0	2
2001–02	Huddinge IK J20	J20 SuperElit	34	8	8	16	10	4	0	0	0	4
2002–03	Huddinge IK	Allsvenskan	42	5	2	7	42	—	—	—	—	—
2003–04	Huddinge IK	Allsvenskan	43	4	1	5	30	—	—	—	—	—
2004–05	Huddinge IK	Allsvenskan	34	3	6	9	28	—	—	—	—	—
2005–06	Huddinge IK	Division 1	36	4	8	12	28	6	0	1	1	2
2006–07	Huddinge IK	HockeyAllsvenskan	43	3	6	9	28	8	0	1	1	8
2008–09	Trångsunds IF	Division 1	10	0	0	0	8	—	—	—	—	—
2009–10	Tullinge TP	Division 3	10	1	2	3	39	—	—	—	—	—
2010–11	Tullinge TP	Division 3	9	3	5	8	6	—	—	—	—	—
2011–12	Tullinge TP	Division 4	3	1	2	3	2	—	—	—	—	—
2012–13	Tullinge TP	Division 3	11	1	4	5	8	—	—	—	—	—
2013–14	Tullinge TP	Division 4	7	2	2	4	4	—	—	—	—	—
2014–15	Tullinge TP	Division 4	10	8	4	12	10	—	—	—	—	—
2015–16	Tullinge TP	Division 4	2	3	0	3	0	—	—	—	—	—
2016–17	Tullinge TP	Division 4	2	0	2	2	2	—	—	—	—	—
2017–18	Tullinge TP	Division 4	5	3	1	4	2	—	—	—	—	—
2018–19	Grantorps AIK	Division 5	4	1	1	2	0	—	—	—	—	—
2019–20	Grantorps AIK	Division 5	10	10	5	15	32	—	—	—	—	—
2020–21	Grantorps AIK	Division 5	2	0	1	1	0	—	—	—	—	—
2021–22	Grantorps AIK	Division 5	14	9	6	15	10	—	—	—	—	—
2022–23	Arken HC	Division 5	1	0	0	0	0	—	—	—	—	—
Allsvenskan totals			119	12	9	21	100	—	—	—	—	—
Division 1 totals			46	4	8	12	36	6	0	1	1	2
