= Howard I. Adler =

American biologist

Howard I. Adler (July 1, 1931 – March 12, 1998) was an American biologist.

== Early life and education ==
Adler grew up in New York City and attended Cornell University for his undergraduate degree, earning the valedictorian title for his graduating class. He also completed his Ph.D. in microbiology at Cornell.

== Career ==
Adler worked for most of his career at Oak Ridge National Laboratory, serving as the head of the laboratory's biology division. In his later years at ORNL, Adler was researching the factors that facilitated the recovery of radiation-damaged cells. During his research, he found that some parts of organelles contained respiratory enzymes that generated anaerobic environments, meaning parts of cells could create environments with no oxygen. Adler realized that the creation of anaerobic environments could be produced on a mass scale. He co-founded Oxyrase, Inc., which produces and markets oxygen reducing agents, in 1987. He worked with the company after his retirement from ORNL.

Howard Adler died in 1998 from pancreatic cancer.
