= Jacob O. Adler =

American professor of economics and business (1913–1999)

Jacob O. Adler (1913–1999) was the professor of economics and business at the University of Hawaiʻi and author of the book Claus Spreckels: The Sugar King in Hawaii (1966).

Born in Illinois but residing in Honolulu, Hawaii, up until his death, Adler was survived by his wife Thelma and hānai (adopted) son Tony Sitachitta. He was inurned at the National Memorial Cemetery of the Pacific, Punchbowl.

Adler's Sugar King book is used as a source in Jon M. Van Dyke's Who Owns The Crown Lands of Hawai'i?
