= Daniel Adler (prosecutor) =

Argentine prosecutor

Daniel Adler is an Argentine prosecutor. He started a case against the judge Federico Hooft, accusing him of not investigating two forced disappearances in 1977. Hooft was acquitted from all charges in April 2014 by eight votes against two in the jury trial. Adler was in turn accused for his role in the case, for procedural scam, ideological deception, dereliction of duty and malfeasance.

Daniel Adler represents the attorney general Alejandra Gils Carbó in the trial against prosecutor José María Campagnoli, who investigated The Route of the K-Money.
