= Angelo Mascheroni (bishop) =

Italian Roman Catholic bishop (born 1929)

The Most Reverend Angelo Mascheroni
- Auxiliary Bishop Emeritus of Milan
- Church: Catholic Church
- Archdiocese: Milan
- Appointed: 9 June 1990
- Term ended: 10 January 2005

Orders
- Ordination: 7 June 1952 by Alfredo Ildefonso Schuster
- Consecration: 24 June 1990 by Carlo Cardinal Martini, S.J.

Personal details
- Born: Angelo Mascheroni; 13 October 1929 (age 96) Sesto San Giovanni, Kingdom of Italy

Angelo Mascheroni (born 13 October 1929) is an Italian Roman Catholic prelate who served as Auxiliary Bishop of the Archdiocese of Milan from 1990 until his retirement in 2005.

== Early life and priesthood ==
Angelo Mascheroni was born on 13 October 1929 in Sesto San Giovanni, near Milan, in northern Italy. He was ordained a priest for the Archdiocese of Milan on 7 June 1952 by Cardinal Alfredo Ildefonso Schuster.

During his priestly ministry in the archdiocese, he held a variety of pastoral and administrative posts, including service as a vicar for the diocesan clergy and roles in pastoral care and formation (details in diocesan sources).

== Episcopal ministry ==
On 9 June 1990, Pope John Paul II appointed Mascheroni as Auxiliary Bishop of Milan and Titular Bishop of Forum Flaminii. He received his episcopal consecration on 24 June 1990 from Carlo Maria Martini, S.J., then Archbishop of Milan, with co-consecrators including Alessandro Maggiolini and Bernardo Citterio.

As an auxiliary bishop, Mascheroni supported the archbishop in pastoral governance of the archdiocese, including assignments such as overseeing clergy formation, serving on diocesan commissions, and assisting in liturgical and sacramental ministry throughout the territory of the Archdiocese of Milan.

He retired on 10 January 2005 upon reaching the age limit for bishops, becoming Auxiliary Bishop Emeritus of Milan.
