= Charles Adler Jr. =

American engineer (1899–1980)

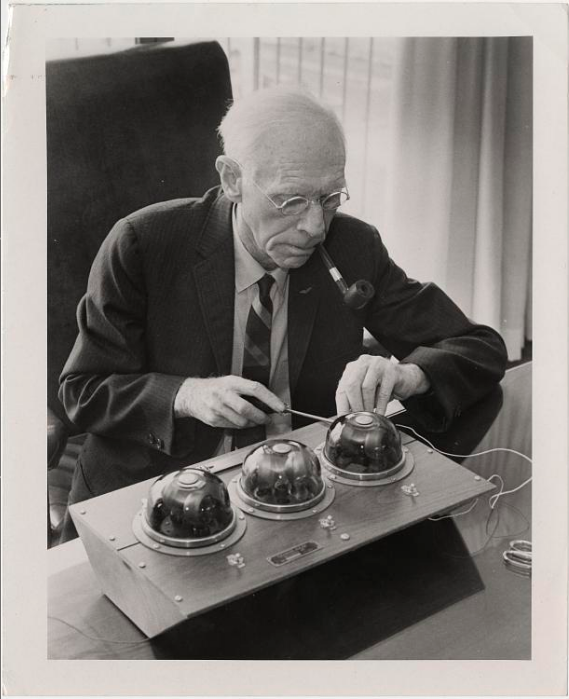
- Born: June 20, 1899
- Died: October 23, 1980 (aged 81)
- Education: Johns Hopkins University
- Occupations: Inventor, Engineer
- Known for: Transportation Safety

Charles Adler Jr. (June 20, 1899 – October 23, 1980) was an American inventor and engineer. He is most known for developing devices meant to improve transportation safety, including sonically actuated traffic lights, colorblind road signals, pedestrian push-buttons, and flashing aircraft lights.

== Early life and education ==
Adler was born to physician Harry Adler and Carolyn “Carrie” Frank in Baltimore, Maryland. As a child he exhibited a vivid imagination. For this reason, Adler’s father encouraged him to pursue inventing.

At age 14, he developed his first documented invention—an automobile brake—which he received a patent for 5 years later.

After high school, Adler attended Johns Hopkins University to study engineering, but after continuing to struggle with academics, he dropped out 2 years later. He served briefly in the U.S. Army training corps as an acting corporal during World War I until December 1918.

== Early career ==
In 1919, Adler began working for the Maryland and Pennsylvania Railroad (also known as the Ma&Pa) as a telegrapher and assistant station agent. There, he began developing safety and signaling devices, where he was later asked by railroad president OH Nance to look into fixing the failing electric warning signals at railroad crossings. In response, Adler designed a system that contained a warning light connected in parallel to the standard bells. This ensured that even if the bells failed, the light would turn on and alert the driver to an oncoming train.

After the success of this system, Adler was promoted within the company to signal engineer and was given resources for his own experiments and research.

For his first solo project, he set out to design a new flashing signal for grade crossings. In his design, he created an automatically triggered system that flashed two lights alternatively in a wigwag pattern when a train was approaching. This invention, called the Adler Flashing Relay, received the American Railway Association’s endorsement and was later adopted by over 40 railroad companies.

After the success of his projects, Adler left the Maryland and Pennsylvania Railroad to pursue invention full-time. However, he remained a signal consultant for the company until 1957.

== Well-known inventions ==
=== Automatic speed control system ===
During his time at Ma&Pa, Adler kept a journal of potential invention ideas for a later date. One of such ideas—the automatic speed-control system—became the focus of his career in the 1920s. He conceived the idea for this automobile safety feature on October 1, 1924, and had a working prototype by December 1925.

Adler’s speed control system was based on the idea of car speed governors, but he believed they should only be activated at particularly dangerous spots on the road. Adler’s system was composed of a series of bar magnets buried under the road 20 meters away from dangerous spots. At speeds over 24 km/h, this magnet activated a series of relays installed in the car which cut the car’s ignition. Once the car had passed over a similar second magnet, the ignition was restored, and the car would be able to accelerate like normal.

Rather than manufacturing the invention himself, Adler decided to publicize his work in hopes of finding a company to license it. He sold the idea to Baltimore and Ohio Railroad and received positive reactions from other buyers. Adler contacted 600 newspapers, magazines, and engineering journals, including Science Monthly and the New York Evening Post, to run stories on his system. However, on December 15, 1926, his financial investors suspended work until they could guarantee the support of the national government.

=== Sonically actuated traffic light ===
In the 1920s Adler worked on developing the sonically actuated traffic light. To operate it, drivers pulled up to a red light and honked their horns to make the light change. The system, designed for use on intersections between lightly traveled and major roads, was first installed by Baltimore on February 22, 1928, at the intersection of Falls Road and then-Belvedere Avenue (now Northern Parkway) and still stands today. Further production of this design was picked up by General Electric, but Adler’s traffic signal was beat out by another invention. This was the first actuated traffic signal in the U.S. and served as the basis for modern traffic signals.

On February 4, 1929, Adler installed a pedestrian push button at the intersection of Charles Street and Cold Spring Lane in Baltimore. It was the first pedestrian-actuated signal.

=== Aviation Safety Signal ===
By the end of the 1930s, Adler’s work on traffic safety came to an end. After getting his pilot’s license and nearly colliding with another plane, he decided to pursue improvements in aviation safety. He patented an external lighting system for airplanes to help pilots better see each other at night. This patent, along with 9 of his other inventions, were transferred by Adler to the U.S. government in the name of safety.

== Other notable inventions ==
=== Colorblind signals ===
In 1930 Adler worked on a traffic signal based on different shapes for colorblind drivers.

=== Double-filament lamp ===
In 1933, Adler’s double-filament lamp was installed on the Pennsylvania Central Railroad. The ability of the bulb to function at half-capacity, even when burnt out, was beneficial in keeping railroad crossing lights functioning for long periods of time. The system remained part of the Pennsylvania Central Railroad until the 1970s.

== Late life ==
Adler continued his work in transportation safety, serving on various transportation boards and advising the government on a number of safety issues. As a member of Maryland’s Traffic Safety Commission during 1952–1980, Adler made recommendations that later resulted in the formation of a federal department of government focused on traffic safety. Adler also established his own foundation in 1956 to help inventors in the field of safety.

In 1961, Adler was appointed to the board of directors of Friendship International Airport (now BWI Marshall) and organized the connection of the airport to the city by rail to reduce traffic. The resulting BWI Rail Station opened in 1980; Adler died hours before the station's dedication, where he was scheduled to be honored.

== Legacy ==
Adler left behind many inventions that were the first of their kind. He is credited with over sixty patented inventions in the field of vehicular safety, some of which he transferred to the government.

His motto was “If they can save lives, I want everyone to have them.” Adler often donated his patents to the government free of charge so that they could be publicly used and help more people.

== See also ==
- Traffic Safety
- Automobile Safety
- Aviation Safety
