= Hans Hermann Adler =

German journalist (1891–1956)

- Born: 7 April 1891; Eger, Austria-Hungary
- Died: 29 March 1956 (aged 64); Wallerstein, West Germany
- Occupation: Professor of Journalism
- Years active: 1930s–1950s
- Employer: Heidelberg University

Hans Hermann Adler (7 April 1891 – 29 March 1956) was a German professor of journalism at the University of Heidelberg.

== Life ==
Adler was a graduate of the Humanist High School Eger in West Bohemia. After completing his studies of classical philology and history at the Charles University in Prague, University of Innsbruck and Humboldt University of Berlin, he received his Ph.D. from the University of Graz. He became a trainee at the J. C. Hinrichs bookstore in Leipzig, a journalist and theater critic, and was editor of the Schlesische Zeitung in Breslau and the Oderzeitung in Frankfurt (Oder). In 1932, he became a professor of journalism at Heidelberg University, endowed by the Verein Deutscher Zeitungsverleger (Association of German Newspaper Publishers). In 1933, after the dismissal of Hans von Eckardt, he took over the director of the Institut für Zeitungswissenschaften (Institute for the Study of Journalism) as honorary professor, and received the privilege of "right to examine" (Prüfungsrecht) (Note: In German law, the Prüfungsrecht defines who has the right to examine candidates for professional certification or advanced degrees, and what rules they operate under.) in the faculties of philosophy, political science, and economics at the University of Heidelberg. He became Director of its Interpreting Institute, and from 1941 to 1945 had regular teaching duties as professor. During this time, he was a member of the editorial board of the Handbuch für Zeitungswissenschaften ("Handbook for the Study of Journalism").

Adler spent the last years of his life in Wallerstein in the Nördlinger Ries in Bavaria and promoted the Egerländer Gmoi, an association of people from the Egerland region.

== Ancestry ==
The origin of the Adler family was in the old bourgeoisie of the Egerland, which since 1392 had held its ministerial seat at Treunitz at Eger (now Dřenice, Cheb). The Egerländer Adlers are probably descendants of the old Bohemian nobility of Adlar from the family of Janovice, which was named after the town of Janowitz an der Angel (Janovice nad Úhlavou), which ultimately takes its name from a man named Johannes. The Janovice and their descendants were historically important, and had a coat of arms featuring an eagle with a horizontal half-moon with clover leaf tips.

== Literature ==
- Hans Hermann Adler, ‘Wege und Aufgaben volksdeutscher Zeitungskunde,’ Auslandsdeutsche Volksforschung 2 (1938), 260–267.
- Handbuch der Zeitungswissenschaften, Leipzig, 1940 Anton Hiersemann Verlag
- Heimatkreis Eger – Geschichte einer deutschen Landschaft in Dokumentation und Erinnerungen, Amberg in der Oberpfalz, 1981, p. 554
- Josef Weinmann: Egerländer Biografisches Lexikon mit ausgewählten Personen aus dem ehemaligen Regierungs-Bezirk Eger, Seite 44, Männedorf / ZH 1985, ISBN 3-922808-12-3
- Albrecht Ackermann: Das Institut für Zeitungswesen ( Zeitungswissenschaft ) an der Universität Heidelberg 1927 – 1945, in: Rüdiger vom Bruch / Otto B. Roegele: Von der Zeitungskunde zur Publizistik: Biographisch-institutionelle Stationen der deutschen Zeitungswissenschaften in der ersten Hälfte des 20. Jahrhunderts, Frankfurt am Mai, Haag & Herchen, 1986.
