= Angelo Mascheroni (composer) =

Italian composer (1855–1905)

Angelo Mascheroni (1855 in Bergamo, Italy – 1905) was a pianist, composer, conductor, and music teacher, brother of the conductor Edoardo Mascheroni. He is most famous for his "Eternamente" for voice and violin, sung by Enrico Caruso; his two-act opera Il mal d'amore, with a libretto by Ferdinando Fontana, was written in 1898. Among his pupils was Spyridon Samaras.

He studied music at the Conservatoire of his native city under the guidance of Alessandro Nini, with such success that at the age of nineteen he became conductor of an operatic company. With them, he made the tour of Italy, France and Spain. Later, Mascheroni spent some years in Greece and Russia and then visited all the cities of importance in North and South America. He spent five years in Paris, perfecting himself in the vocal art at the Paris Conservatoire with Léo Delibes for composition and Camille Saint-Saëns for piano; a few years later, he made a name in England and America.

When Mascheroni arrived in London, unknown, he experienced great difficulty in obtaining a few guineas for his song For all eternity; but this copyright, when sold by public auction a few years later, realised as many thousand guineas — the record price paid for a musical copyright. Other of his successful vocal compositions are: Woodland serenade, with mandolin obbligato, published in 1892, and Ave Maria, composed at Madame Patti's Welsh castle. Mascheroni was the author of several arrangements and original compositions for mandolin and piano, the principal being: On the banks of the Rhine; Tarantella, written in 1894, published by Augener, London; Fantasia on Faust (Gounod), and others of a like nature. Mascheroni also wrote obbligatos for the mandolin to several of his vocal compositions, as well as solos and duos for mandolin, with piano accompaniment.

Music historian Philip J. Bone tried to describe the nature of Mascheroni's music, saying, Mascheroni struck out the golden mean between the German and Italian schools and his compositions combine the solidity and scholarly attainments of the German, with the grace, beauty and charm of the Italian schools." Bone said that Mascheroni's music was permeated with Italian traditions, with a "beautiful melodic structure, a foundation of sound musicianship upon which the lighter graces and charms of lyric art flourish.

Mascheroni had a son who studied the guitar and mandolin under his father and appeared as a guitar soloist in London in 1902.
