= Yiddish Summer Weimar =

Annual Jewish music festival in Germany

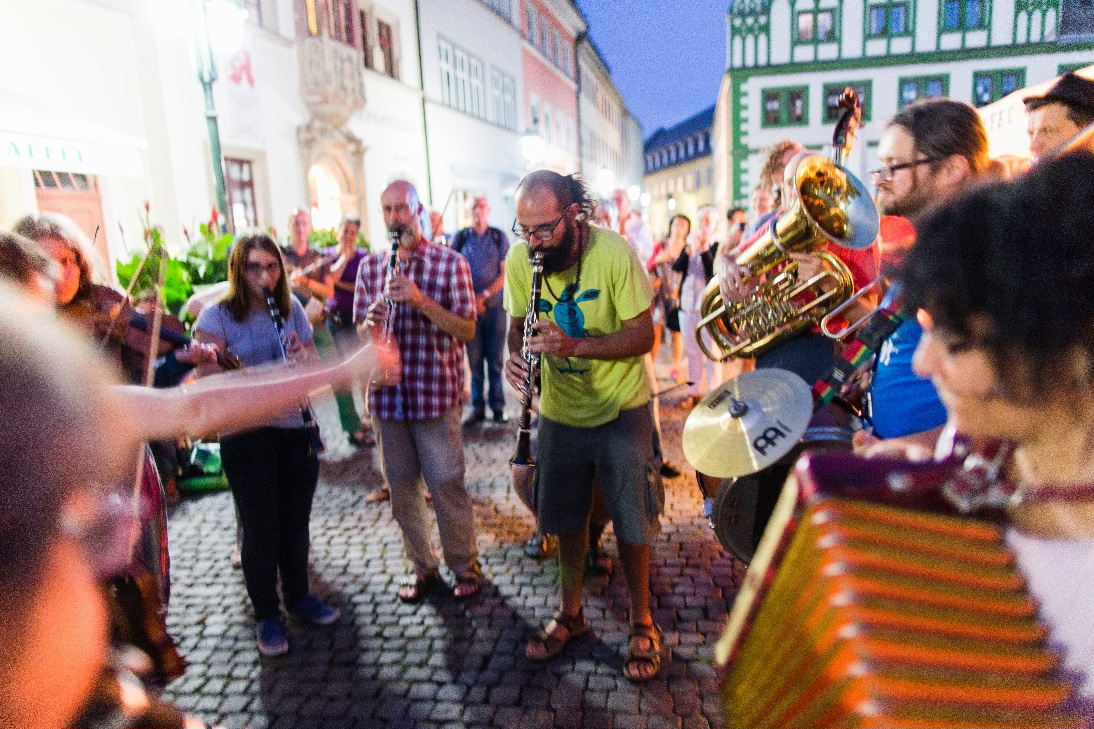
- Genre: Klezmer, Yiddish song, Secular Jewish music, others
- Locations: Weimar, Germany
- Coordinates: 50°59′21.38″N 11°19′27.83″E
- Years active: 2006–present
- Founders: Alan Bern
- Website: https://yiddishsummer.eu/

Yiddish Summer Weimar is an annual summer institute and festival for Yiddish music, language and culture which takes place in Weimar, Germany. Starting as a 3-day workshop in 1998, it was officially founded in its current form in 2006 and has grown to become one of the most important festivals and educational organizations for Klezmer, Yiddish song, Yiddish Language, dance and culture. It is known for its transcultural and transnational perspective which supports an international learning community, for the pedagogical approach of its founder, Alan Bern, and for its commitment to the creation and presentation of historically informed, contemporary Yiddish artistic production.

== History ==
In 1998, the band Brave Old World was invited by the European Summer Academy to teach a 3-day workshop in Yiddish music and dance in Weimar, Germany, followed by a concert. The following year, the city of Weimar was designated a European Capital of Culture and Brave Old World was invited back to teach a week-long workshop followed by a concert. Klezmer music, a genre originating in Eastern Europe and repopularized in the United States in the 1980s, had become popular in Germany in the 1990s due to foreign artists such as Brave Old World, The Klezmatics, Alex Jacobowitz and Giora Feidman, as well as German groups like Kasbek, Aufwind, Zupfgeigenhansel, and Karsten Troyke. A number of American and ex-Soviet klezmer and Yiddish musicians settled in Germany during this time, including Alan Bern (in 1989) and Joel Rubin.

Because of the success of the 1999 Brave Old World workshop, the idea of an annual workshop and festival emerged. In 2000, the Kulturbüro LaRete, run by Julia Draganović, took over the festival management, under the umbrella of the Kuratorium Schloß Ettersburg, a non-profit organization that made it possible to apply for public funding for the festival. At the same time, Bern became the Artistic Director, and the festival was officially named Klezmer Wochen Weimar (Weimar Klezmer Weeks).

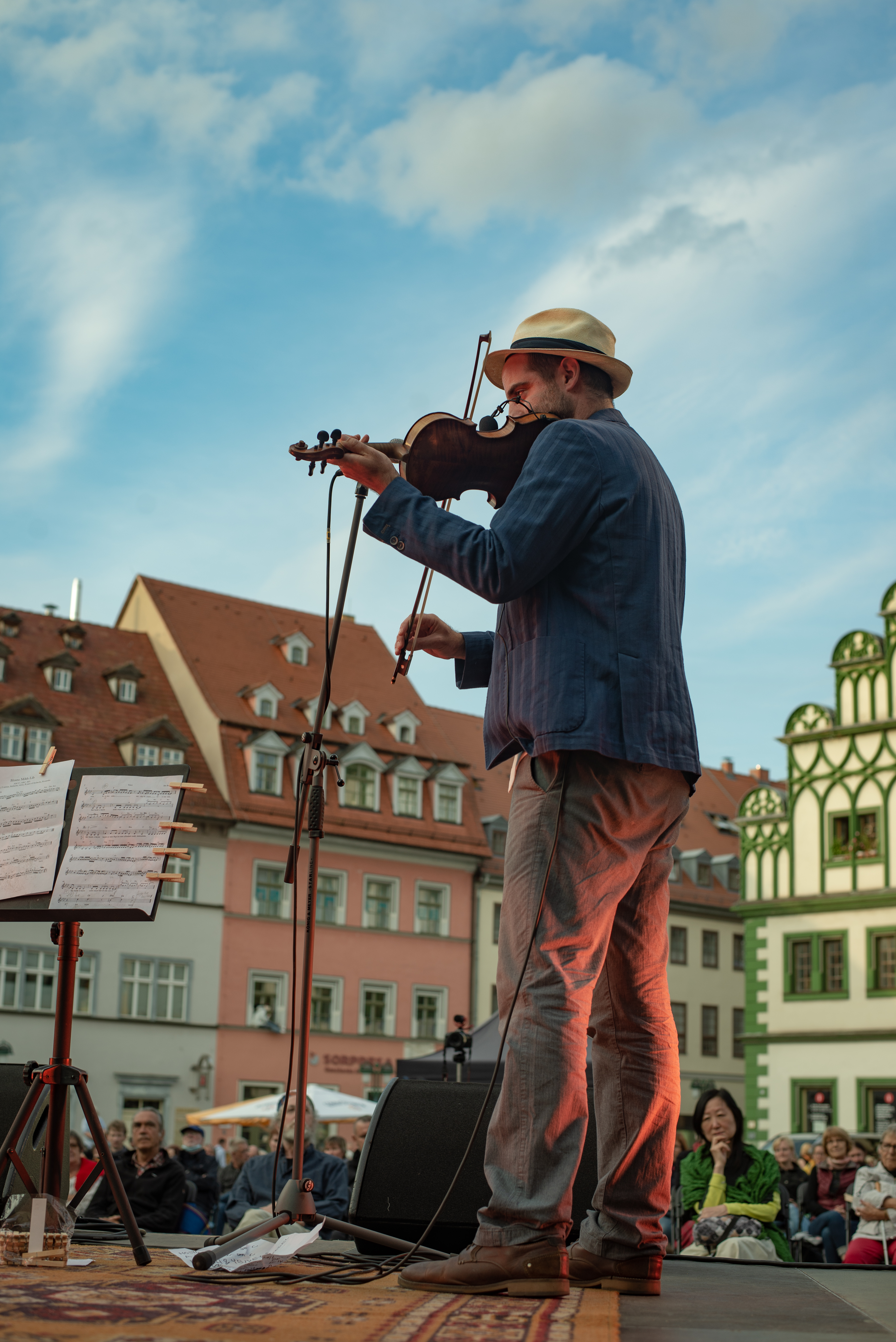
Violinist Craig Judelman performing on stage at the 2020 festival

In 2002 Draganović's role was taken over by Stephanie Erben. Between 2000 and 2005, the festival grew from one week to four weeks through the addition of further week-long workshops dedicated to individual genres of Yiddish expressive culture and language. During this time, public evening jam sessions in cafés became a prominent feature of the festival, giving students rich opportunities for informal learning and creating close connections with the general Weimar community. This integrated urban setting also distinguishes the festival from others such as KlezKanada or KlezKamp, which have operated as rural retreats. In 2005, Bern decided that workshops and concerts would be unified by an annual special topic, and committed the festival to a transcultural and transnational perspective, understanding Yiddish culture as fundamentally related to other cultures in a complex matrix.

By 2006, the festival had outgrown both its original focus on klezmer music and the infrastructure provided by the Kulturbüro LaRete and the Kuratorium Schloß Ettersburg. It was decided to create a new nonprofit organization to run the festival, called Other Music e.V. (changed in 2018 to Other Music Academy e.V.). At the same time, the festival was re-named Yiddish Summer Weimar (YSW). It has since grown to become one of the main Yiddish music and cultural festivals in Germany and worldwide.

In 2008-9, YSW launched its first major international project, The Other Europeans. Funded by the European Union and in partnership with the Jewish Culture Festival in Kraków and the KlezMore Festival in Vienna, The Other Europeans brought together 14 musicians from the USA, Moldova, Bulgaria, Hungary, Germany and Belgium to explore the common repertoire of klezmer and Lăutari musicians who were active in Moldova from the 18th through the late 20th centuries. This project was given the Best Practices Award in Favor of the Roma Community award by the European Commission in 2010, and resulted in a CD released in 2011, Splendor.

In 2010, Erben left the organization and the festival management was taken over by a team that included Katrin Petlusch, Katrin Füllsack and Johannes Paul Gräßer. In 2013, in cooperation with the tourism initiative Weimarer Sommer (Weimar Summer), Yiddish Summer Weimar introduced a special Festival Week featuring nightly concerts and a daytime program of free, hands-on introductory workshops open to everyone. Whereas concerts had previously taken place as part of the workshops, the Festival Week constituted a new platform for concerts, films and other public events in a concentrated period of time, and it remains a central feature of YSW.

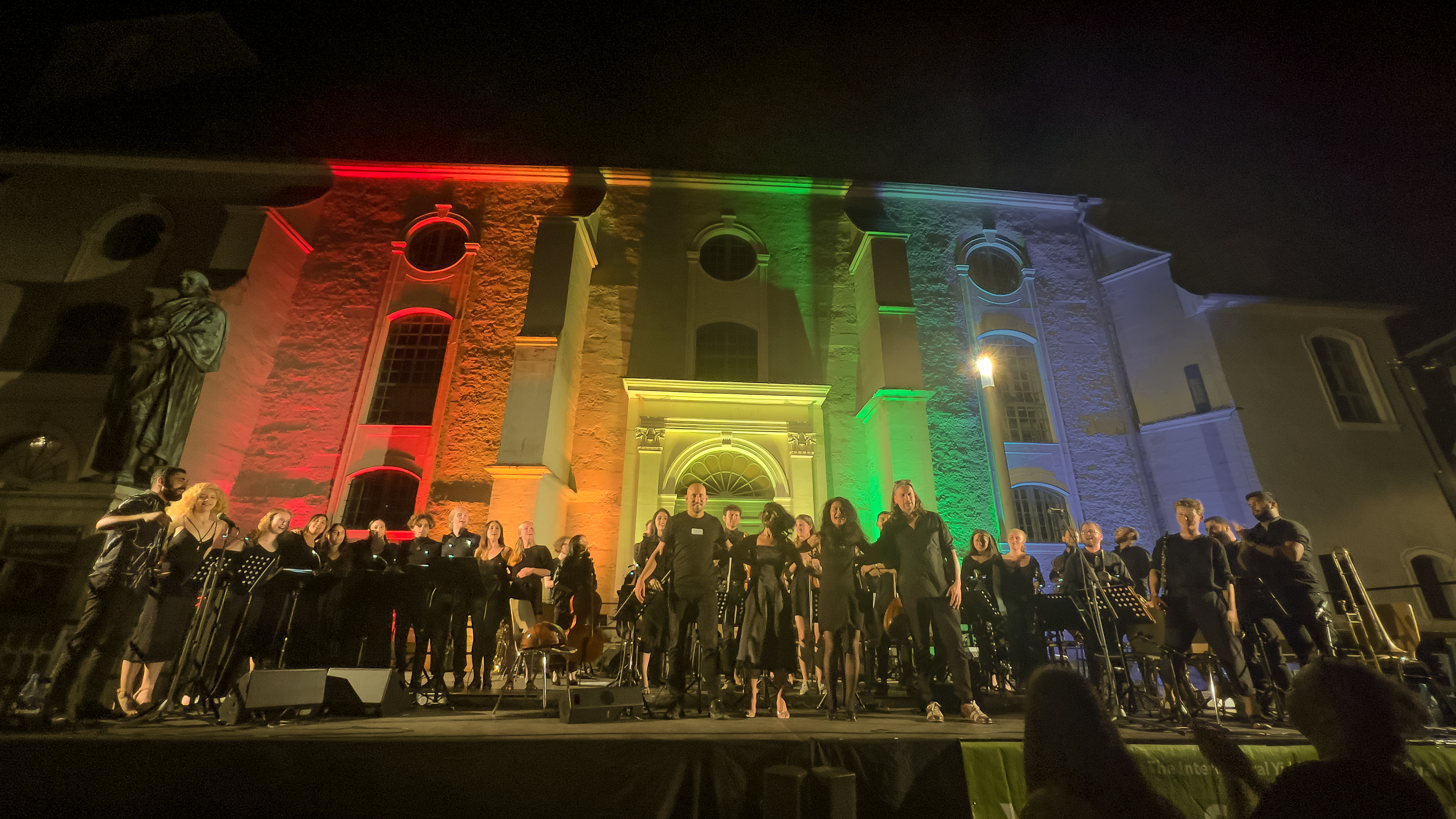
Final concert of the Caravan Orchestra and Choir in 2022

In 2016, YSW received project funding from the German Federal Cultural Foundation for the creation of two major new works: Bobe Mayses: Jewish Knights & Other Legends, a collaborative puppet theater production directed by Jenny Romaine, and Gilgul, a contemporary dance work created and directed by Steven Weintraub. The following year, Andreas Schmitges became Curator of YSW, with Bern continuing as Artistic Director. Under Schmitges’ curatorship, YSW rapidly expanded to include international youth exchange projects such as the Caravan Orchestra, the Kadya Choir, and the Triangle Orchestra, concerts in Erfurt, Eisenach and other cities and towns in Thuringia (YSW goes Thuringia), and a new emphasis on in-house productions of New Yiddish Culture. 2019 represented the pre-pandemic high point of this development, when, once again with the support of the Federal Cultural Foundation of Germany, Yiddish Summer Weimar was able to produce seven major original, international artistic projects in the framework of "The Weimar Republic of Yiddishland": Di megile fun Vaymar (led by Alan Bern), Arestantnlieder (led by Josh Dolgin), Waxband (led by Amit Weisberger), Baym Cabaret Yitesh (led by Michael Wex), Pleytim tsuzamen (led by Josh Waletzky), Berliner Goles (led by Yuri Vedenyapin), and Shaydveg Vaymar (led by Polina Shepherd, Daniel Kahn and Efim Chorny).

Since 2019, YSW has explicitly embraced a four-fold mission: the research, transmission, creation and presentation of historically-informed New Yiddish Culture. In 2020 and 2021, YSW took place outdoors and in special formats due to the Covid pandemic and dance events were cancelled. In 2022 and 2023, it has returned to its pre-pandemic format of mixed indoors and outdoors venues, workshops, concerts, the Festival Week and other special events. On average, more than 200 people attend one or more workshops each year, and approximately 10,000 attend its public events. Many of the workshop attendees return annually.

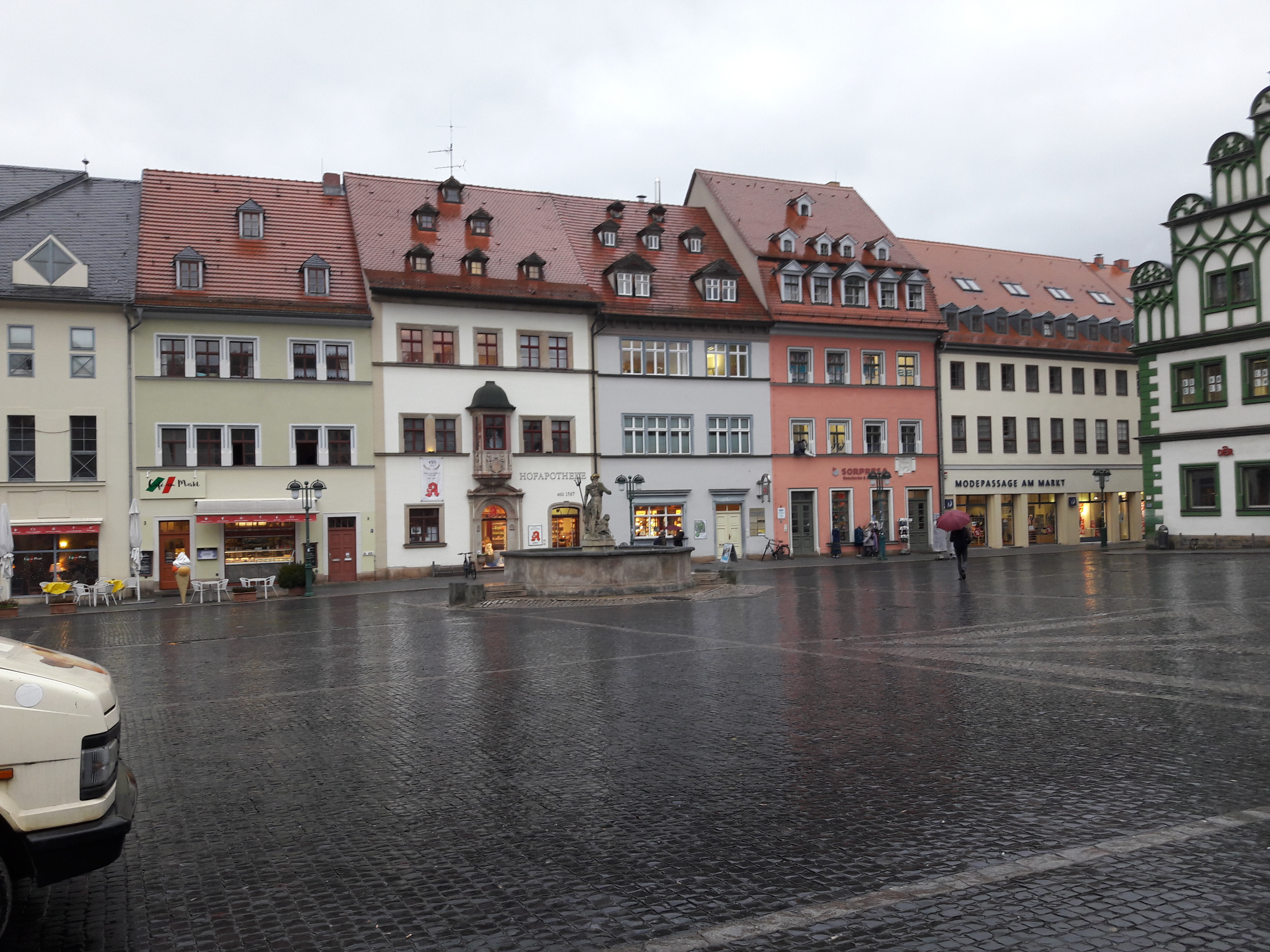
A square in Weimar

Stefan Wolf, the Lord Mayor of Weimar from 2006 to 2018, has been a major supporter of the festival. In 2009 Weimar gave the nonprofit organization a 33-year, low cost lease on an unused, former school building; it became the home of the Other Music Academy (OMA), conceived as a new kind of cultural center dedicated to diversity, inclusion, individual and social empowerment and creativity. The OMA is the physical home base for Yiddish Summer Weimar and all of its other projects. Peter Kleine, the current Lord Mayor of Weimar, is also a major supporter of both YSW and the OMA. The festival has received recognition and occasional support from the European Commission, the Federal Cultural Foundation, the Ministries of Education and Culture of Thuringia, the German Music Council, the city government of Weimar as well many other public agencies, private foundations and individuals.

== Pedagogy ==
The festival's pedagogical approach has been developed by its founder Alan Bern, and distinguishes it from other annual Jewish or Yiddish music workshops. The ethnomusicologist Phil Alexander has described it as having four main elements: "looseness of structure and process, continuity between music and physical movement, organic connection between all stages of music making, and integration into the city and community." Special attention is also paid to issues of identity, authenticity, and intercultural interactions. While the courses investigate Jewish culture and traditions, they are open to non-Jewish participants who often make up a significant portion of attendees, coming not only from Germany but a number of other countries.

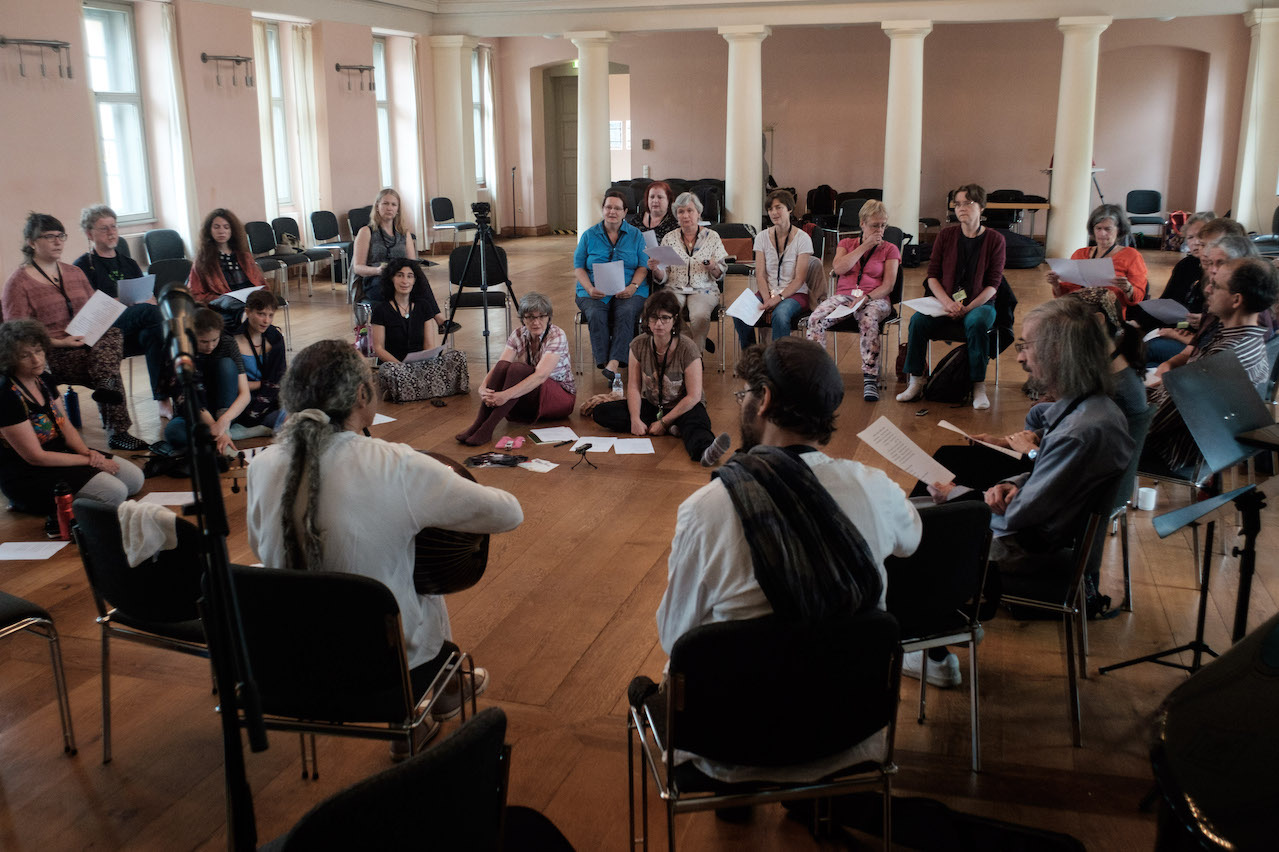
A 2017 workshop at the festival

In developing the teaching method at YSW, Bern was inspired by his work in the mid-1980s with Ted Sizer's Coalition of Essential Schools, which emphasized the need for teachers to model learning rather than to impart knowledge, and that the lifelong creativity and enthusiasm of teachers is essential to inspiring students. To achieve this, teachers teach in teams and act as project leaders, helping to guide a process of discovery along with their students. Bern applied this principle to the YSW workshops, leading to the atmosphere of a learning community. Workshop teachers engage in an ongoing exchange with each other as well as with the participants, with flexible scheduling, project-based learning, and an emphasis on learning and playing by ear and other kinds of embodied knowledge, rather than score- or text-based knowledge. For this reason, workshop teachers are either artists with an ongoing practice of research and performance, or scholars who work closely with active artists. The Other Music Academy, the “parent” institution of YSW, operates year-round, also works to explore such topics in an empowering and empathetic way, not only with respect to Yiddish culture but to all of contemporary culture.

== In popular culture ==
The festival has been appeared in various documentary films.The Broken Sound (German: Der Zerbrochene Klang), 2012, focused on The Other Europeans project, while The Young Kadyas (2020) examined the Kadya Choir Project. Two other documentaries are still in production: Beyond All Memories (2024, about the Semer Ensemble), and Yiddishland (2024, by Ros Horin).

== Selected past instructors ==
- Michael Alpert (singer, violin, songwriting)
- Kálmán Balogh (Cimbalom)
- Helen (Khayele) Beer (Yiddish language)
- Erik Bendix (Yiddish dance)
- Alan Bern (piano, accordion, composition)
- Zilien Biret (clarinet)
- Dan Blacksberg (trombone)
- Kurt Bjorling (clarinet, cimbalom, musicology)
- Paul Brody (trumpet, composition)
- Stuart Brotman (bass and other instruments)
- Marin Bunea (violin)
- Mendy Cahan (Yiddish language, acting)
- Miriam Camerini (rabbinics, singer, directing)
- Efim Chorny (singer, composition)
- Adrienne Cooper (singer)
- Silvia Czaranko (accordion, piano)
- Christina Crowder (accordion)
- Matt Darriau (clarinet, saxophone)
- Roswitha Dasch (singer, violin)
- Christian Dawid
- Susi Evans (clarinetist, accordionist)
- Patrick Farrell (accordion, piano)
- Walter Zev Feldman (cimbalom, musicology, history)
- Pesakh Fiszman (Yiddish language)
- Benjy Fox-Rosen (bass, singer)
- Isabel Frey (singer)
- Arkady Gendler (singer, songwriting)
- Suzanna Ghergus (piano, composition)
- Marine Goldwaser (clarinet, saxophone, flute)
- Emil Goldschmidt (clarinet)
- Avery Gosfield (instrumental, musicology)
- Itzik Gottesman (Yiddish language, folklore)
- Kryiakos Gouventas (violin)
- Johannes Paul Gräßer (violin)
- Steven Greenman (violin, composition)
- Tayfun Gutstadt (ney, oud, guitar)
- Josh Horowitz (accordion, piano, composition, scholarship)
- Craig Judelman (violin)
- Daniel Kahn (singer, songwriting, translation, instrumental)
- Dov-Ber Kerler (Yiddish language, scholarship)
- Vassilis Ketentzoglou (guitar)
- Mark Kovnatskiy (violin, composition)
- Sveta Kundish (cantor, singer)
- Franka Lampe (accordion)
- César Lerner (instrumental)
- Tcha Limberger (singer, violin, guitar)
- Shura Lipovsky (singer, songwriting)
- Frank London (trumpet, composition, instrumental)
- Danai Loukidi (violin)
- Sasha Lurje (singer, percussion)
- Diana Matut (Yiddish scholar, singer)
- Eftychia Mitritsa (singer, songwriting, piano)
- Sanne Möricke (accordion)
- Marcelo Moguilevsky (instrumental)
- Katharina Müther (accordion, singer)
- Sarah Myerson (cantor, singer, Yiddish dance)
- Simon Neuberg (Yiddish scholarship)
- Hannah Ochner (clarinet)
- Andrea Pancur (singer, songwriting)
- Sofia Papazoglou (singer)
- Ethel Raim (singer, Yiddish folksong scholarship)
- Peter Ralchev (accordion)
- Jonah Rayko (violin)
- Abigale Reisman (violin)
- Adrian Receanu (clarinet)
- Joel Rubin (clarinet, scholarship)
- Beyle Schaechter-Gottesman (Yiddish poetry, songwriting, visual art)
- Andreas Schmitges (Yiddish dance, mandolin, guitar, musicologist)
- Cookie Segelstein (violinist, composer)
- Merlin Shepherd (clarinet)
- Polina Shepherd (singer, piano, Conducting)
- Deborah Strauss (violin, accordion, dance)
- Ilya Shneyveys (accordion, multi-instrumentalist)
- Adam Stinga (trumpet)
- Jake Shulman-Ment (violin)
- Dilek Türkan (singer)
- Yuri Vedenyapin (Yiddish language, singer, guitar)
- Josh Waletsky (singer, songwriting, Yiddish language)
- Jeff Warschauer (cantor, mandolin, guitar)
- Steven Weintraub (Yiddish dance)
- Janina Wurbs (Yiddish language, history)
- Michael Winograd (clarinet, piano, composition)
- Esther Wratschko (singer, bassoon)
- Sayumi Yoshida (Yiddish dance)

== Annual topics ==
- 2005: Crossroads: New York to Constantinople
- 2006: Basarabye
- 2007: Tradition and New Impulses
- 2008: The Other Europeans, I
- 2009: The Other Europeans, II
- 2010: Yidishkayt!
- 2011: Ashkenaz: the Jewish-German Cultural Matrix
- 2012: The Bridges of Ashkenaz: Ashkenaz I & II
- 2013: New Yiddish Music
- 2014: New Yiddish Culture
- 2015: Yidishkayt Revisited
- 2016: Bobe Mayses? European Legends & Yiddish Border-Crossings
- 2017: The Other Israel I: Seeing Unseen Diasporas
- 2018: The Other Israel II: New Spaces
- 2019: The Weimar Republic of Yiddishland
- 2020: Live!
- 2021: Wandering Stars: the Kiselgof-Makonovetskiy Digital Music Project
- 2022: Greco-Turkish-Yiddish Connections
- 2023: Ottoman Musical Routes & Roots
- 2024: Moldavian Yiddish Connections
- 2025: 25th Anniversary
- 2026: Yiddish Wo:men: Another Story of Modernity
