= KlezKanada =

Canadian organization promoting Yiddish culture

- קלעז־קאַנאַדע
- Established: 1996; 30 years ago
- Founders: Hy and Sandy Goldman
- Type: non-profit charitable organization
- Registration no.: 864963566 RR 0001
- Purpose: Promoting Yiddish culture, primarily by organizing annual weeklong festival
- Official language: English, Yiddish
- Executive Director: David Moss
- Artistic Director: Avia Moore
- Website: klezkanada.org

KlezKanada (Yiddish: קלעז־קאַנאַדע) is a Canadian organization for the promotion of klezmer music and Yiddish culture. Its principal program is a week-long Jewish music festival founded in 1996 which takes place annually in August in the Laurentian Mountains north of Montreal. Between 1996 and 2022 it took place at Camp B'nai B'rith in Lantier, Quebec; more recently it takes place at Le P'tit Bonheur de Sablon in Lac-Supérieur. The organization also hosts workshops, concerts, and other educational programs in Montreal throughout the year.

== History ==
KlezKanada was founded by a group of local cultural activists led by Hy and Sandy Goldman in 1996. In its first year its festival had roughly 300 participants. It was inspired by KlezKamp, a similar festival in New York State which had been founded a few years earlier. By the late 1990s KlezKanada had grown in size and began attracting many of the top musicians in the field, as well as offering a scholarship program for young musicians.

In an article on klezmer, Mike Anklewicz noted the development of the festival:

I have noted a shift from instruction in strictly historical klezmer in KlezKanada's first few years, to the inclusion of a much more diverse curriculum since about 2001… By 2008, workshops addressed both historical styles and the creation of contemporary works in all genres of music, including Yiddish songs, writing for Yiddish theatre, contemporary Yiddish dance, instrumental improvisation, and instrumental composition.

The camp is based around courses and lectures during the day (relating to klezmer music, Yiddish, and other topics) and concerts at night.

In 2001, "of the [festival's] 37 teaching and performance staff, 22 were New York-based." Since then, the festival faculty has become more diverse: in 2018, fewer than half of the teaching faculty were American, while over a third came from Canada, and the rest from other countries, including Germany, Poland, and Russia.

== Past participants ==
- Adeena Karasick
- Adrienne Cooper
- Alan Bern
- Alicia Svigals
- Anthony Coleman
- Anthony Russell
- Beyond the Pale
- Brave Old World
- César Lerner
- Daniel Kahn & the Painted Bird
- Elaine Hoffman Watts
- Flory Jagoda
- Frank London
- Geoff Berner
- German Goldenshteyn
- Hankus Netsky
- Henry Sapoznik
- The Klezmatics
- Klezmer Conservatory Band
- Lisa Gutkin
- Margot Leverett
- Mark Slobin
- Michael Alpert
- Michael Steinlauf
- Michael Wex
- Nahma Sandrow
- Pete Rushefsky
- Socalled
- Tamara Brooks
- Theodore Bikel
- Veretski Pass
- Yaëla Hertz
