= Christian Dawid =

German musician

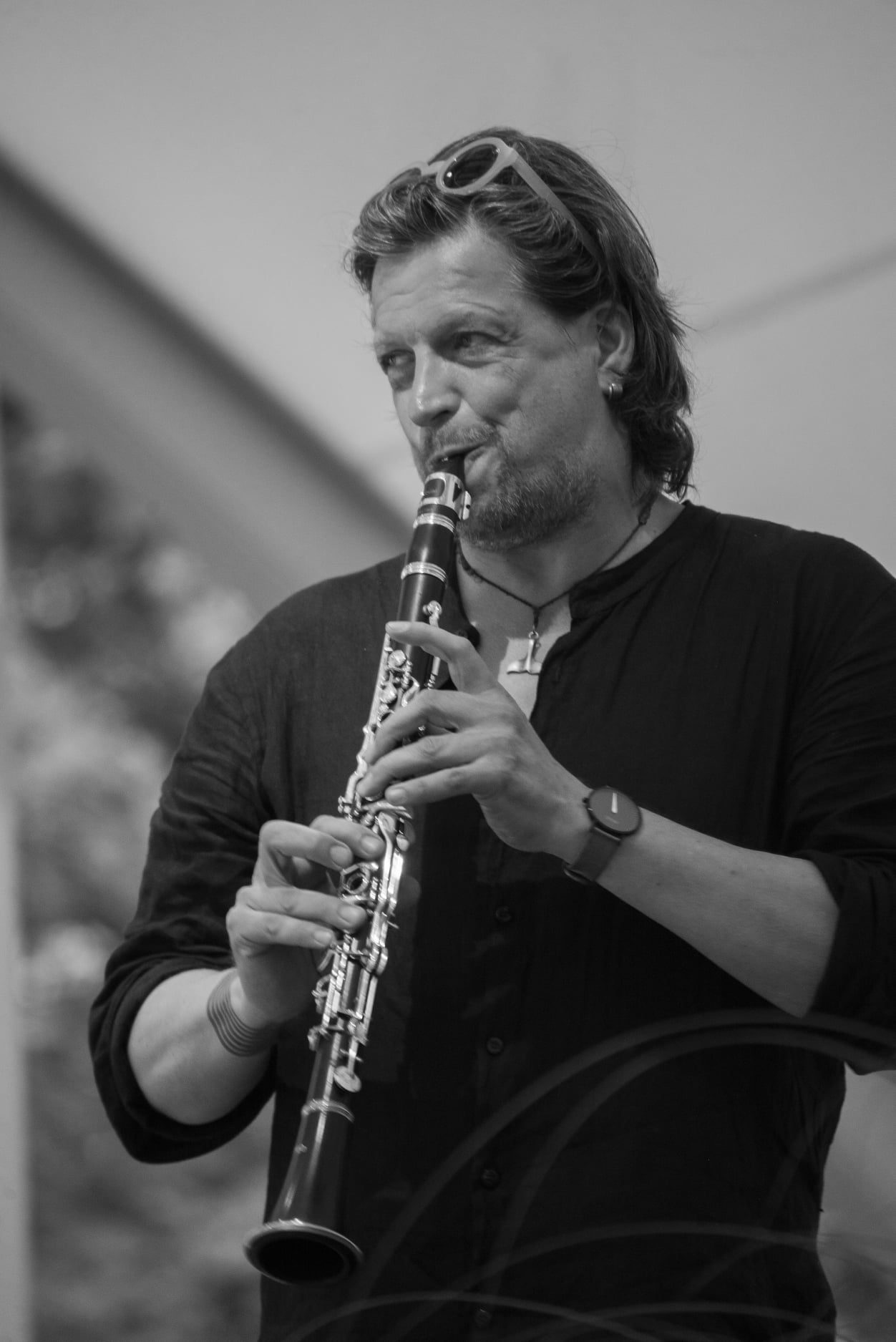

Background information
- Born: 1966 (age 59–60); Bremen
- Genres: Klezmer
- Occupation: musician
- Instruments: Clarinet, Saxophone
- Member of: Bremer Klarinettenquartett, Konsonans Retro, Trio Yas, Daniel Kahn & the Painted Bird, Ben Caplan, Michael Winograd & The Honorable Mentshn
- Formerly of: Klezgoyim, Budowitz, Khupe, Paul Brody's Sadawi, Alpenklezmer, Brave Old World.
- Website: christiandawid.com

Christian Dawid (born 1966) is a German clarinetist, Klezmer musician, educator, and composer. He is generally regarded as one of the top Klezmer musicians in Germany, and has performed with groups such as Trio Yas and Khupe, as well as with international Klezmer groups such as Brave Old World, Daniel Kahn & the Painted Bird, Ben Caplan, Budowitz and The Other Europeans.

Some of his major projects are related to Ukrainian Jewish music, including a project to record the songs of the Yiddish singer Arkady Gendler, and bringing the Podolian brass band of the Baranovsky family to international audiences as Konsonans Retro.

== Biography ==
Dawid was born in Bremen, West Germany in 1966. His father was a Protestant Pastor from Bremen and his mother is an educator turned sculptor born in East Prussia. Christian spent the first thirty years of his life in Bremen; he studied clarinet at the University of the Arts Bremen. After finishing at the conservatory he did not pursue a traditional classical music career and instead became a freelancer working in various German and world music projects. It was during that time that he became more interested in Klezmer music and started playing it.

He was particularly influenced by a workshop he took with Brave Old World, Henry Sapoznik and others in 1995. In the 1990s, he played in a German klezmer group called Klezgoyim. By the early 2000s, he began to teach at Klezmer festivals in Europe and North America, including Yiddish Summer Weimar and KlezKanada. He has since become one of the top klezmer musicians in Germany, and one of the most prominent non-Jewish klezmer musicians globally. He first toured with Brave Old World in 1999, and became a member Budowitz in 2000. He has continued to tour with both groups, and others, periodically since then.

Later that decade, he became acquainted with a family brass band from Kodyma, Ukraine, the Baranovskys. This group of ethnic Ukrainians preserved Klezmer melodies in their family repertoire dating from past generations; Dawid joined them on clarinet and saxophone and they toured internationally as Konsonans Retro. They released two albums together, in 2007 and 2010.

In 2009 he traveled on an EU-funded trip to Moldova with Alan Bern, klezmer researcher Walter Zev Feldman and a large group of musicians and researchers to investigate the links between Jewish and Moldovan Roma music. The resulting collaboration with Roma musicians from Moldova and elsewhere was called The Other Europeans; Dawid played clarinet in the "Jewish" half of the group.

In 2010 he became the Instrumental Music Coordinator at KlezKanada, a role which he still holds and which has been redefined as the Music Program Coordinator.

In the early 2010s, he led a project to record the Ukrainian Yiddish singer and songwriter Arkady Gendler (1921–2017). Dawid arranged 11 of Gendler's original songs, which were recorded with the singer and a small ensemble in Vienna in late 2011. Following the release of the album, Dawid and Yiddish music and dance researcher Avia Moore traveled to visit Gendler in Ukraine in 2012.

In 2016, Dawid helped cofound a Berlin klezmer festival called Shtetl Neukölln (which has since been renamed Shtetl Berlin).

== Selected works ==
=== Books ===
- Arkady Gendler - Yidishe Lider (Golden Horn Records, 2012)
- Klezmer duets: clarinet & accordion (with Alan Bern, Universal Edition, 2016)

=== Albums ===
- Mit der kale tantsn : Jiddische Musik (With Khupe; Yellowjacket music, 1999)
- Khupeheymisher (with Khupe; Klezmerdialogues, 2003)
- A Podolian affair (with Konsonans Retro, Oriente Music, 2007)
- Budowitz Live (with Budowitz, Golden Horn Records, 2007)
- For the Moment (with Paul Brody's Sadawi, Tzadik Records, 2007)
- Zagnitkiv (with Konsonans Retro, Rybalka Records, 2010)
- Trio Yas Live (with Trio Yas, 2012)
- Yidishe lider (with Arkady Gendler singing; Golden Horn Records, 2013)
- Get up! The Dance Album (with Trio Yas, 2018)
- Christian Plays Jewish (2021)
- Alte Tänze (2022)
