= Adrienne Cooper =

American musician

Adrienne Joy Cooper (Khane Freyde)
- Born: September 1, 1946; Oakland, California, U.S.
- Died: December 25, 2011 (aged 65) New York City, U.S.
- Genres: Yiddish, klezmer
- Occupations: Singer, musician
- Instrument: Singing

Adrienne Cooper (September 1, 1946 – December 25, 2011) was a Yiddish singer, musician and activist who was integral to the contemporary revival of klezmer music.

== Biography ==
In addition to her work as a Yiddish singer she was the assistant director at the YIVO Institute for Jewish Research, program director for the Museum of Chinese in America, and executive officer for programming and executive officer for external affairs for the Workmen's Circle. She co-founded KlezKamp. She was a member of Jews for Racial and Economic Justice's Board of Directors until the summer of 2011, when she was diagnosed with cancer. Cooper won the Rabbi Marshall T. Meyer Risk Taker Award from the Jews for Racial and Economic Justice in 2010, as well as KlezKanada's Lifetime Achievement Award in Yiddish Arts and Culture.

She died of adrenal cancer at Roosevelt Hospital in Manhattan on December 25, 2011, aged 65. She had been diagnosed in July 2011 and underwent surgery in August 2011.

Her partner, Marilyn Lerner, is a pianist-composer. Her daughter, Sarah Mina Gordon, is a vocalist and co-leader of the band "Yiddish Princess."

== Commemoration ==
"A Kholem/Dreaming in Yiddish: A Concert in Tribute to Adrienne Cooper" was organized for December 22, 2012, at the Kaye Playhouse at Hunter College in New York City. More than 50 Yiddish and klezmer musicians and global colleagues performed songs that Adrienne taught, sang, and recorded – these include The Klezmatics, Michael Wex, Shura Lipovsky, Daniel Kahn, Theresa Tova, Zalmen Mlotek, Eleanor Reissa, Wolf Krakowski, Michael Alpert, Michael Winograd, Sarah Gordon.

The Adrienne Cooper Dreaming in Yiddish Award was established in her honor, issued annually by the Adrienne Cooper Fund for Dreaming in Yiddish since 2013.

Dreaming in Yiddish awardees: Deborah Strauss, 2024, Daniel Kahn, 2023, Rokhl Kafrissen, 2022, Jeffrey Shandler, 2021, Shane Baker, 2020, Kolya Borodulin, 2019, Efim Chorny & Susana Ghergus, 2018, Shura Lipovsky, 2017, Irena Klepfisz, 2016, Josh Dolgin/Socalled, 2015, Michael Wex, 2014, Jenny Romaine, 2013.

== Discography ==
=== Solo recordings ===
- Enchanted (2010)
- Dreaming in Yiddish (1995)

=== Other ===
- In Love And in Struggle: The Musical Legacy Of The Jewish Labor Bund [ Zalmen Mlotek, Dan Rous, The New Yiddish Chorale, The Workmen's Circle Chorus ] (1999)
- Ghetto Tango [ Zalmen Mlotek ] (2000)
- Mikveh [ Alicia Svigals, Margot Leverett, Lauren Brody, Nicki Parrot ] (2001)
