= Michael Winograd =

- Born: 1982 (age 43–44)
- Genres: klezmer
- Instrument: clarinet
- Years active: 2004–present
- Label: OU People
- Website: michaelwinograd.net

Michael Winograd (born 1982) is an American klezmer clarinetist and composer. He has performed with such groups and artists as Vulfpeck, Vulfmon, Tarras Band, Geoff Berner, Socalled, Adrienne Cooper, Daniel Kahn & the Painted Bird and Michael Winograd and the Honorable Mentshn.

== Biography ==
Winograd was born in 1982 in New Hyde Park, New York, on Long Island. He grew up on Long Island; he cited his father, who had wide musical tastes, as an important influence. At age 14 he went to KlezKamp at the invitation of a friend, which was his first major introduction to klezmer music; he became a regular attendee there and at KlezKanada. He studied under Hankus Netsky at the New England Conservatory of Music and privately with clarinetists Andy Statman, Sid Beckerman and Matt Darriau. While at the Conservatory he founded a band with fellow students called Khevre; he graduated in 2005.

Winograd relocated to Brooklyn and rose to prominence as one of the leading musicians in the Klezmer world, initially with his Michael Winograd Trio, and soon collaborated with artists such as Socalled, Frank London, Budowitz, Daniel Kahn & the Painted Bird, the Klezmer Conservatory Band, Michael Alpert, and Alicia Svigals. He was strongly influenced by popular klezmer clarinetists of the mid-twentieth century, including Naftule Brandwein and Dave Tarras. He gradually moved from being a student at festivals such as KlezKamp, Yiddish Summer Weimar and KlezKanada, to teaching at them. During this time he also began to compose original klezmer pieces. Winograd has recorded with a number of music groups in the past two decades, and since 2008 has released more than 10 albums of his own klezmer compositions.

In 2017 he was made Artistic Director of KlezKanada, succeeding Frank London. He held the role for several seasons, stepping down in 2021.

== Selected recordings ==
- Bessarabian Hop (CD Baby, 2008)
- Storm Game (Golden Horn Records, 2013)
- Kosher Style (OU People, 2019)
- Michael Winograd plays Brandwein (OU People, 2020)
- Early Bird Special (OU People, 2022)
