= Joel Rubin =

American musician (born 1955)

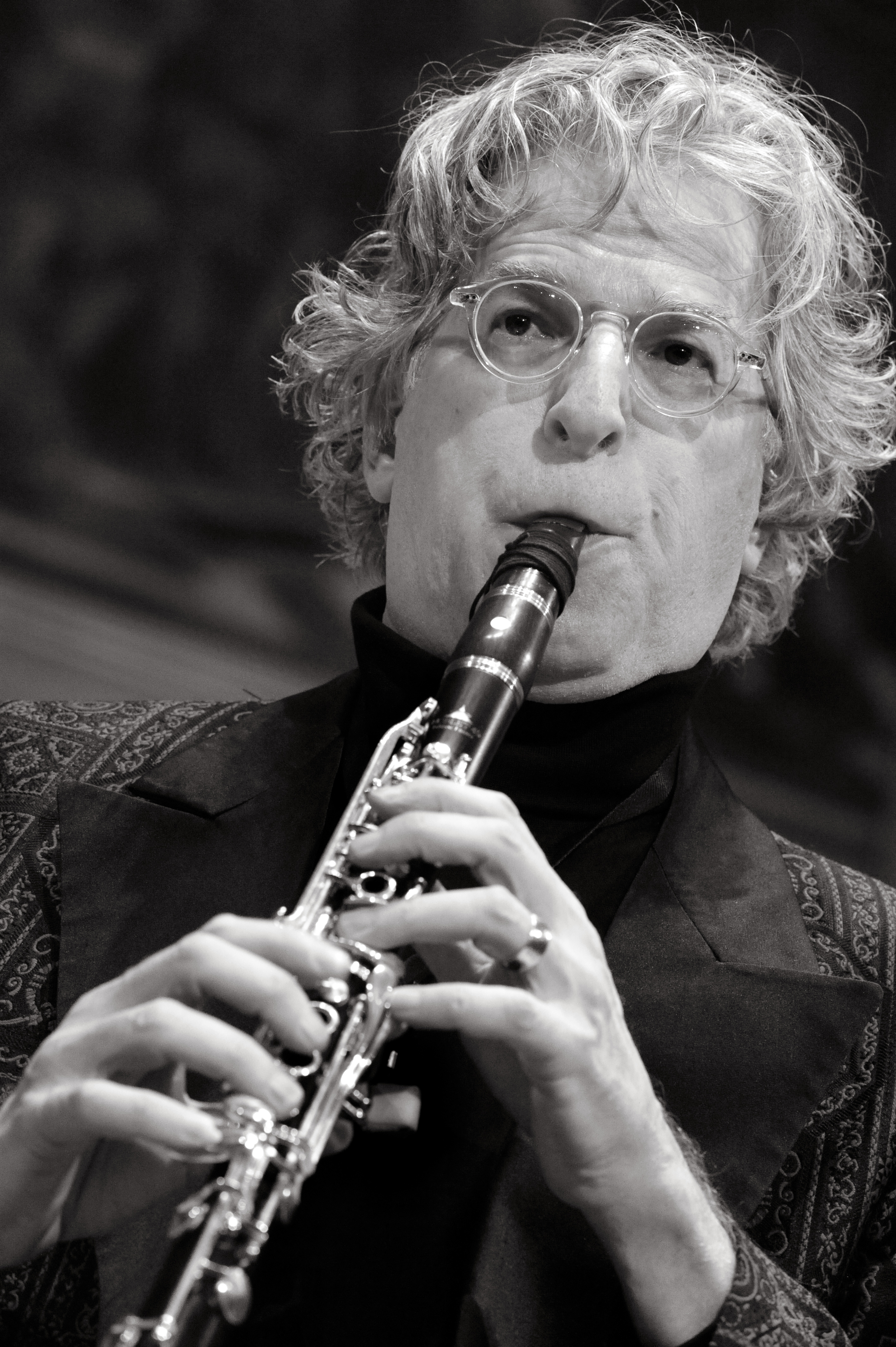
Joel Rubin

Joel Rubin is an American clarinetist, klezmer musician, ethnomusicologist, and scholar of Jewish music. Since becoming involved in the klezmer revival in the late 1970s, he has been researching, teaching and performing klezmer music and related genres. He has been a member of, or performed with, such groups as Brave Old World, the Joel Rubin Ensemble, and Veretski Pass.

== Biography ==
=== Early life and education ===
Joel Rubin was born in Los Angeles in 1955. His paternal grandfather, who was from Kyiv, was a guitarist and his maternal grandfather, who was from New York City, was a passionate fan of classical music and opera. Both men instilled a love of music in him. Rubin's father was a psychoanalyst and his mother was a visual artist and painter. From 1973 to 1975, Rubin studied classical clarinet with Richard Stoltzman at the California Institute of the Arts. Rubin was exposed to a wider range of Eastern European music from Bill Douglas during that time. In 1975 he relocated to New York City where he studied with Kalmen Opperman, who he continued to study with for several decades. In 1978 he received a Bachelor of Fine Arts from the School of Music at the State University of New York at Purchase. At around that time, he was experimenting with jazz music and other more contemporary genres. He was often performing with Lisa Rose, a pianist who was interested in Jewish music, and when an acquaintance lent him an LP by Dave Tarras, he began to take a greater interest in klezmer music.

=== Music career ===
Rubin's career as a performer of klezmer music began in 1980 in the Hester Street Klezmer band from Portland, Oregon, as well as a duo with Lisa Rose called The Old Country. He said in a 2021 interview that few people in Portland at that time had any awareness of the genre. At that time, old recordings were fairly difficult to find anywhere in the United States, so musicians would trade cassettes of 78-rpm records from the 1920s or visit archives such as YIVO in New York. KlezKamp was founded in 1985, and he started teaching there annually. In San Francisco from 1986 to 1989 he played with the Joel Rubin Klezmer Band, which included Michael Alpert and Stuart Brotman. In 1988, he started a new duo with accordionist Alan Bern, which Brotman and Alpert soon joined as well; the group eventually became Brave Old World. Rubin moved to Berlin, Germany, in 1989; for the next three years, Brave Old World toured regularly in Europe, although in 1992 Rubin left the group.

In 1994, he founded his next project, which still performs to this day, the Joel Rubin Ensemble, which includes Kálmán Balogh on cimbalom, David Chernyavsky on violin, and Claudio Jacomucci on accordion. (The violinist in the ensemble was also Steven Greenman for a time and is and currently Mark Kovnatskiy). He also began to perform as a duo with Joshua Horowitz, who was living in Austria at the time. In 1994, he recorded a CD with Horowitz (Bessarabian Symphony). Both that 1994 album and his subsequent Joel Rubin Ensemble CD Beregovski's Khasene (1997) drew heavily on melodies collected by Soviet ethnomusicologist Moisei Beregovsky, which at that time were still not being performed much by klezmer revival musicians.

Since 2013, Rubin has been collaborating more frequently with the group Veretski Pass, releasing two albums with them, Poyln, A Gilgul (2015) and The Magid Chronicles (2019), which was based on the work of Sofia Magid.

Over the years, Rubin has appeared on stage with a number of other traditional performers such as the Epstein Brothers, Moshe "Moussa" Berlin, Seymour Rexite and Miriam Kressyn, Leon Schwartz, Sid Beckerman, Pete Sokolow, Danny Rubinstein, Ben Bazyler, and Leopold Kozlowski, Vladimir Terletsky and Bronya Sakina. He has also appeared with klezmer revival groups such as the Klezmer Conservatory Band, Daniel Kahn & the Painted Bird, The Klezmatics, and the Maxwell Street Klezmer Band. He has also directed some university klezmer ensembles, including the University of Virginia Klezmer Ensemble (of which he has been the director since 2006), the Syracuse University Klezmer Ensemble (in 2006), and the Cornell University Klezmer Ensemble (2003–2006).

== Research and teaching ==
Rubin has been teaching klezmer music since KlezKamp was founded in 1985. He noted in a recent interview that there was very little information available in English about klezmer at that time, which motivated him to begin his own research into the genre in the early 1980s. Since then, he has become a prominent scholar of klezmer music, Hasidic music, and related genres of Jewish music. He began collaborating with Ethnomusicologist Rita Ottens in the early 1990s; they have since collaborated on a number of books. Rubin's research into the Epstein Brothers Orchestra in the 1990s led to the creation of a documentary film directed by Stefan Schwietert called A Tickle in the Heart (1996).

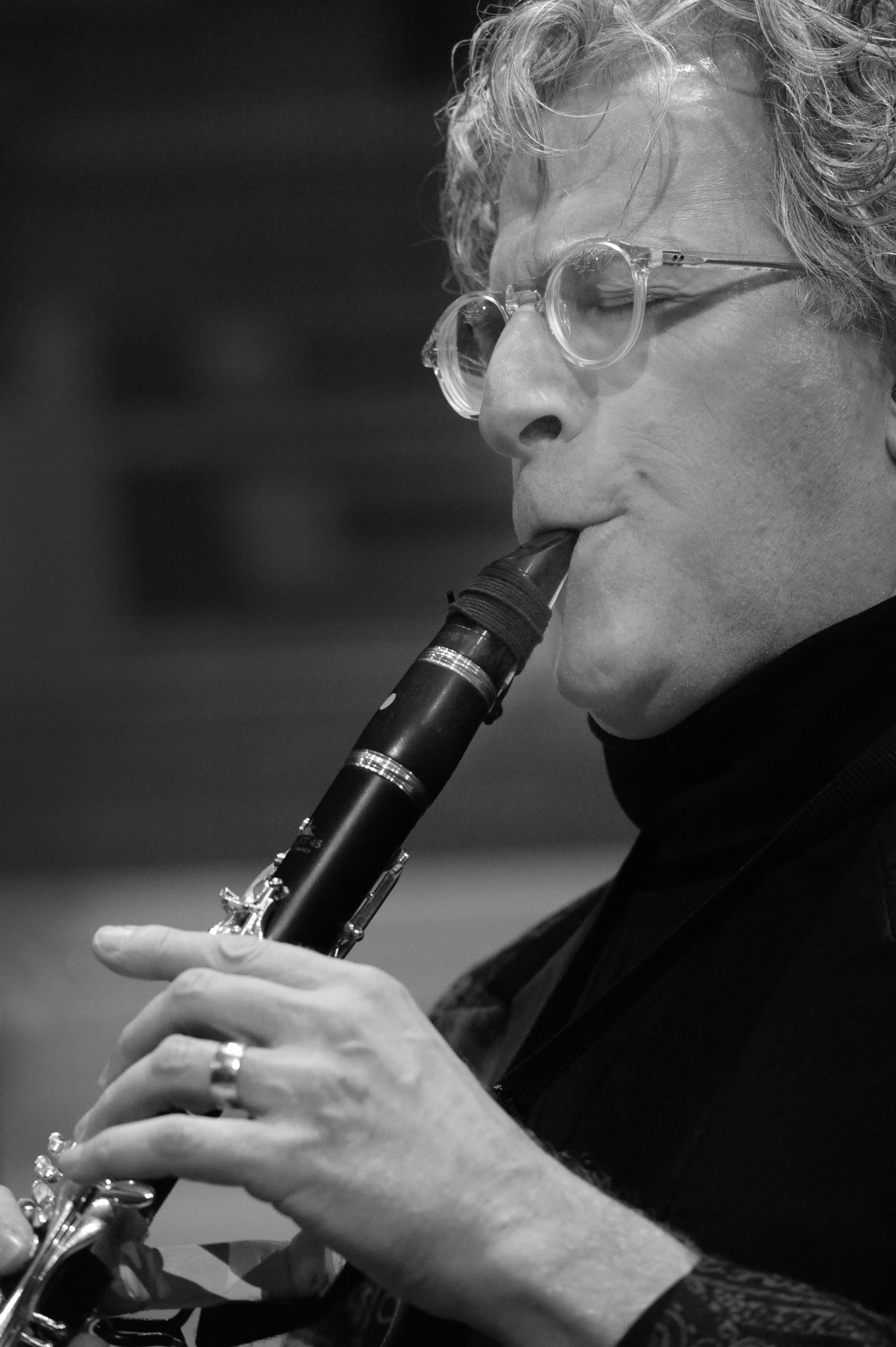
Joel Rubin

His 2001 dissertation at City, University of London, examined the performance style of klezmer clarinetists Dave Tarras and Naftule Brandwein. His most recent book, New York Klezmer in the Early Twentieth Century: The Music of Naftule Brandwein and Dave Tarras (University of Rochester Press, 2020) revisits those two clarinetists.

After finishing his PhD, in 2003 he returned to the United States and worked as an instructor at Cornell University and Ithaca College in Ithaca, New York. In 2006 he became an assistant professor at the University of Virginia where he worked until 2020. At present he is an Adjunct Researcher at the University of Bern.

He has also published many academic papers, many of which are available on Academia.edu. In 2021, Rubin deposited his collection of research materials and other documents with the Library of Congress American Folklife Center.

== Selected publications ==
- Jüdische Musiktraditionen (Jewish Musical Traditions), co-authored with Rita Ottens. Gustav Bosse Verlag, 2001.
- Klezmer-Musik, co-authored with Rita Ottens. Bärenreiter and dtv, 1999.
- Mazltov! Jewish-American Wedding Music for Clarinet. Schott Musik International, 1998.
- New York Klezmer in the Early Twentieth Century: The Music of Naftule Brandwein and Dave Tarras. University of Rochester Press, 2020.

== Selected recordings ==
- Joel Rubin Klezmer Band. Brave Old World (1988, Global Village).
- Brave Old World. Klezmer Music (1991, Flying Fish Records)
- Joel Rubin and Josh Horowitz. Bessarabian Symphony: Early Jewish Instrumental Music (1994, Schott WERGO)
- Joel Rubin with the Epstein Brothers Orchestra. Zeydes un Eyniklekh (Grandfathers and Grandsons): American-Jewish Wedding Music from the Repertoire of Dave Tarras (1995, Schott WERGO).
- Joel Rubin Jewish Music Ensemble. Beregovski's Khasene (Beregovski's Wedding): Forgotten Instrumental Treasures from the Ukraine (1997, Schott WERGO).
- Joel Rubin Ensemble. Midnight Prayer (2007, Traditional Crossroads).
- Joel Rubin and Uri Caine. Azoy Tsu Tsveyt (2011, Tzadik Records)
- Joel Rubin Ensemble featuring Rabbi Eli Silberstein. Nign of Reb Mendel: Hasidic Songs in Yiddish (2010, Traditional Crossroads).
- Veretski Pass with Joel Rubin. Poyln, A Gilgul (2015, Golden Horn Records)
- Veretski Pass with Joel Rubin. The Magid Chronicles (2019, Golden Horn RecoRECORDrds), based on the work of Sofia Magid

== Curated or produced albums ==
- Shteygers (Ways). New Klezmer Music 1991–1994, Trikont, 1995
- Yikhes (Lineage): Early Klezmer Recordings 1911–1939 (1996, Trikont)
- Doyres (Generations): Traditional Klezmer Recordings 1979–1994 (1995, Trikont)
- Jüdische Lebenswelten/Patterns of Jewish Life: Highlights from the Concert Series 'Traditional and Popular Jewish Music' Berlin 1992, (1993, Schott WERGO)
- The Epstein Brothers Orchestra. Kings of Freylekh Land: A Century of Yiddish-American Music (1995, Schott WERGO)
- Hungry Hearts: Classic Yiddish Clarinet Solos of the 1920s (1998, Schott WERGO)
- Oytsres (Treasures): Klezmer Music 1908–1996 (1999, Schott WERGO)
- Cantor Isaac Algazi: Sweet Singer of Israel. Ottoman Jewish Music from the Early 20th Century, in cooperation with Prof. Edwin Seroussi and the Renanot Institute for Jewish Music, Schott WERGO, 2002
- Di eybike mame (The Eternal Mother): Women in Yiddish Theater and Popular Song 1906–1929 (2003, Schott WERGO)
- Shalom Comrade!: Yiddish Music in the Soviet Union 1928–1961 (2005, Schott WERGO)
- Aneinu (Answer Us): Hasidic-Orthodox Music from the Festival of the Torah in Jerusalem (Moussa Berlin Ensemble) (2008, Schott WERGO)
- Chekhov's Band: Eastern European Klezmer Music from the EMI Archives 1908–1913 (2015, Renair Records)
