= Paul Brody =

American jazz trumpeter, composer and bandleader

Paul Brody (born in 1961 in Seattle) is a US-American sound installation artist, composer, trumpeter, and writer based in Berlin. His work explores the relationship between spoken word and melody through radio art, Sound installation, composition, and performance.

== Biography ==
=== Youth and education ===
Paul Brody's father was the son of a Ukrainian immigrant and his mother was a Jewish refugee from Nazi-era Vienna.

Brody spent most of his youth in San Leandro, California, where his struggles with dyslexia led him to find his voice in music and poetry. He studied composition, poetry, and trumpet at San Francisco State University and Boston University and Third stream music at the New England Conservatory of Music. As a writer and performer, Brody was active in the Boston's lively poetry and experimental music scene. At Boston University he produced a series of inter-disciplinary events with actors, dancers, poets and musicians, which he called Un-recitals. He learned from such poets as Denise Levertov, Bill Knot, Derek Walcott and Charles Simic and was often invited to read for literary events. Before receiving a bachelor in music performance he won two prizes from Boston University's literary magazine, Ex Libris. After earning a master's degree in Third stream music from the New England Conservatory of Music, Brody toured with various ensembles before settling in Berlin to pursue a career as a composer, performer, and sound artist.

=== Sound installation ===
Citing influences from Joseph Beuys, Charles Ives, Samuel Beckett, and the Art Ensemble of Chicago, along with the story and folklore collecting traditions of Studs Terkel and Alan Lomax, Brody uses oral history to create word and sound-orientated narratives from documentary material. "A story is a melody and a melody is a story," Brody explained in an interview with Der Tagesspiegel. His installation work generally examines the relationship between voice-melody (Sprechgesang) and identity and the notion of home. Brody believes that while words carry one meaning, the voice-melody can be heard as carrying its own independent narrative. Voices speaking one language with the melody of another language contain infinitely more complex parallel narratives. In addition, the voice-melody reveals both impersonal and personal information: origin, family history, travels, but also emotional state and physical condition.

Brody's first major sound installation was featured at the Jewish Museum Berlin's 2011 Heimatkunde (local history) Exhibit. Five Easy Pieces explored the notion of home by asking people who live in Berlin to describe how they view themselves in relation to their adopted city. The installation includes Swiss filmmaker Dani Levy, Afro-German writer Katharina Oguntoy, Indian curator Mini Kapur, teachers Anna and Helmut Franz, and Brody himself. While the Berliners describe their place in Berlin, their voice-melodies reveal much about where they come from and their emotional state. The museum built a surround sound room to display the exhibit.

Brody created a surveillance art piece, Five Families Listening: An Eavesdropping Installation (2015), for the NK art space in connection with the Transmediale Festival for Art and Digital Culture. The piece explores the acoustic spaces of living rooms through secret recordings of families talking.

Brody's Art Accompanying Noise (2016) for the Prinz-Georg Art Space is a pivotal work, exploring the narrative quality of sounds that artists make while they work. The materials and tools an artist uses to create a picture or a sculpture all create a soundscape (for example, the sound of glass being chipped and wood being cut). Even the sound of paint smeared on canvas has a particular acoustic quality, revealing the work process, a kind of narrative. These sounds are recorded, along with the artist talking about his or her inspiration for the piece being made. The recorded sounds and the voice of the artist are used to create a musical sound installation displayed in a container for the artist's work. The artwork itself is secondary to the sounds used for the installation, therefore the by-product of the noise becomes the subject of focus, while the finished objects of art are secondary.

Talking Melody-Singing Story (2016) was done as Brody's Artist-in-Residence project for the Munich Kammerspiele. The piece is based on an opera's two main components, the aria and the recitative. For Talking-Melody, Brody recorded singers recalling the moment they discovered that their voices were special. The stories are used to create arias based on the voice-melodies of the singers. For Singing-Story Brody recorded people in three different cities describing what opera is to them. The answers were accompanied by a recitative accompaniment, and the interviews include vocal stars Anna Prohaska, Laurent Naouri and Lorin Sklamberg. A mini opera house was built to contain the installation. The Süddeutsche Zeitung writes:

Talking Melody - Singing Story'. Der knapp zwanzigminütige Hörfilm des amerikanische Musikers Paul Brody reißt die oft so perfekt inszenierte Oberfläche der Kunstform Oper auf, lässt etwa Sänger intim plaudern oder befragt Strafgefangene in Alabama zu ihrem Verhältnis zur Oper, genauso wie deutsche Passanten... Brodys Klanginstallation fängt diesen Moment des Intimwerdens wunderbar auf: Opernsänger, die über ihre ersten bewussten Erfahrungen mit ihrer Stimme plaudern - die meisten dieser Sängern fangen dann prompt an, Kinderlieder zu singen - nicht erzwungen, mehr als klangliches Beispiel für ihre Anekdoten.

— Süddeutsche Zeitung July 8th 2016. online

Voices of Help (2016-2017) was a three-room documentary sound installation at the Youth Museum Berlin. The piece explored concepts of help through interviews with community and social workers around Berlin's so-called Rote Insel, or Red Island, an erstwhile socialist stronghold in Schöneberg. The recording of each voice received an instrument that brought out the personal qualities of the interviewees. The first room was dedicated to hearing the stories of how helpers began; the second explored the tools of professional social workers through collected narratives; the third investigated those expanding the system of help, mostly by volunteering to help refugees in ways meaningful to the helpers themselves. The exhibit was inspired by a Studs Terkel-like curiosity about the neighborhood—where Brody lives—the knowledge that help is not as prominent in US-American culture as it is in Germany, and by the people who had helped Brody's mother decades before when she escaped Nazi Vienna on a Kindertransport (Children's train) at age 13.

Brody's 2018 sound installation, Webern from the Inside and Outside, was commissioned by the Pierre Boulez Saal-Daniel Barenboim Stiftung in Berlin. The immersive sound installation is constructed from fragments of Austrian composer Anton Webern's letters that show his moods and reflections on composing. The colorful descriptions are purposely short to reflect the Webern's musical style: short compositions where texture and color are more prominent than melody and development. Brody recorded an actor reading fragments of Webern's letters and used the voice-melody of the actor's voice for his compositions. The idea of speaking and singing a song became a feature in both classical composition and in cabaret music in the 30s. Using the recording of the voice-melody of the actor as a framework for his sound installation, Brody followed in the tradition of Schoenberg and Webern by coloring in the compositions with musical colors and textures: this technique is called Klangfarbenmelodien (Sound color melodies), and was often used by later composers like György Ligeti. As a dedication to Webern, Brody colored the spoken fragments of Webern's letters with bits and pieces of Webern's own compositions which Brody had sampled. So while listening to Webern's feelings about music, about problems with his colleagues, and his struggles with his insecurities, one hears the musical world of Webern – thus the title of the sound installation, Webern From the Inside and Outside.

In 2019 Brody's composition and sound design premiered at the Institute for Cultural Inquiry, Berlin. He collaborated with Columbia University Professor and American Academy Scholar, Rosalind C. Morris in her art documentary film, Zama Zama, about gold miners in South Africa.

In 2019 the Canadian Language Museum in Toronto commissioned Brody's The Music of Yiddish Blessings and Curses. The sound installation explores the sonic and narrative qualities of Yiddish blessings and cures through interviews with native Yiddish speakers in the Toronto area. Photo portraits of the speakers are included in the installation. Brody was fascinated by Yiddish blessings and curses because of their unique humor, and because curses and blessings reflect both the idiosyncrasies of a culture in their content, and a deep emotionality from the individual saying them.

As the 2020 Artist in Residence at the Museums Quartier at the Tonspur: Kunstverein Wien sound art space, Brody combines the idea of Klangfarbenmelodien with speech-melody composition. 5 Mini Operas in Ordinary Language grew out of a commission for the Opéra National de Lorraine, in Nancy, France. The libretto of Paul Brody's upcoming work will be constructed from interviews with local residents about love, and the music is derived from note-for-note transcriptions of the melodies of the recorded voices. A 30-piece choir and four soloists will bring those stories and voice-melodies on stage of the baroque opera house. 5 Mini Operas in Ordinary Language provides a counterpoint to the grand opera project. Through recorded interviews, it explores the singing qualities of the everyday speaking voice. Brody experiments with compositional techniques to direct the listener's ear to the independent musical qualities of the voice. Words become secondary.

Much of Brody's work is based on the premise that daily conversation contains as much melodic expression as an operatic aria. The spoken voice has its own narration, independent of subject matter, formed by the speaker's life history: family background, geography, age, mood, perhaps even genetic memory. We often filter out this information to focus on the subject matter. Despite all its expressive power, our speaking voice is usually just a servant of words—except in extreme cases: crying, laughing, utterances inspired by food and sex. At the outer limits of expression, our voice leaves words and becomes its own instrument. 5 Mini Operas is an immersive sound installation that attempts to topple the hierarchy of listening by unhooking syntax and freeing the voice from the tyranny of subject matter, redirecting the ear to the narrative of the voice itself.

The sound installation consists of five short interviews about language and belonging. The interviewees tell us how finding their voice gave them a sense of belonging, an inner Heimat. The listener will hear a few selected interviews from Brody's past projects combined with new interviews, in both English and German. Following operatic tradition, each part of 5 Mini Operas in Ordinary Language begins with a short overture – a mini-homage to one of Brody's primary musical influences, Anton Webern. Then the interviewees share anecdotes illustrating an awareness of their own accent.

Finding musical inspiration from voice-melodies goes back to early opera. The baroque opera was not aria oriented, but a string of recitatives: that is, a kind of heightened speech-singing strung into a story. Composer Leoš Janáček was obsessed with vocal patterns. He transcribed them constantly and enjoyed putting them in his compositions. Steve Reich's Different Trains is perhaps the most well known voice-melody oriented composition. Brody's interest in vocal patterns bridges both artistic and anthropological. His music seems to ask, "Where does this voice-melody come from? What does it tell us about this person?"

=== Radio art and documentary ===
Between 2007 and 2012 Paul Brody produced a series of children's radio features about young people in different countries who are involved in music. The series portrayed not only the musical ideas of young performers and composers, but reflected on their social and cultural life as well and its implications for their music.

In the WDR (West German Radio) series 'Musikselbermachen' ('making music yourself') (2007-2008) Brody also worked with young narrators who presented the features. From 2010 to 2012 Brody continued the project for the SWR series 'Klangküche' ('sound kitchen'. The young musicians, playing a variety of styles, hailed from Guatemala, Canada, the United States, and Eastern and Western Europe.

In 2013 Brody produced a short piece for the Berlin Stories series of National Public Radio, entitled How I didn't meet Diana Ross.

In 2014 he produced The Fringe Sound of Berlin, a full-length feature exploring the culture of sound in the capital. How does the city sound? And how does the city's mentality affect its musicians? The feature includes interviews with architects such as Barkow Leibinger, Christine Edmaier, writers Leslie Dunton-Downer, Robert Beachy, and Carol Scherer; and musicians David Marton, Marie Goyette, David Moss, Daniel Dorsch, Wolfgang Müller, and Jochen Arbeit from the Einstürzende Neubauten.

In 2014 Brody helped develop the three part series Made in America for WDR. He wrote and produced the road trip feature Southern Discomfort– A Jew from Oklahoma for the series. It explores the cultural crossroads of Jewish and Southern American culture through the life of legendary bassist and songwriter Mark Rubin.

In 2016 Brody wrote and produced Most Wanted Poets, Escape from Alabama Prison, a WDR radio feature exploring the effect of art on poetry in the harsh environment of the Alabama prison system.

In 2017 Brody produced a WDR feature exploring cultural perspectives of the German constitution and transformed his Munich Kammerspiele Artist in Residence project, Talking Melody-Singing Story, into a radio art piece for Deutschlandradio.

In 2019 Brody produced an autobiographical radio feature for WDR: Jazzy Diaspora -Birth of a Secular Jew. While explaining his family history he tells about how his evolution as a musician playing Jewish music in Berlin inspired him to develop a new perspective on Jewish culture. Throughout the story, Brody discovers how music can embody the constant self-questioning in contemporary Jewish culture without demanding an answer. The Jazzy Diaspora won a place in the WDR lineup for the 2020 Prix Europa Broadcasting Festival.

=== Performance art ===
Breaking from the performance traditions of classical and jazz trumpet, Brody fuses his work with language, art and melody into his trumpet playing. His solo techniques often involve movement, utilizing the performance space, creating sounds, and drawing melodic inspiration from speech rather than traditional melodic ideas. The rich experimental theater scene in Berlin led him to the director David Marton, who is well known for his music theater experiments. In the Marton ensemble Brody works as a performance artist, fusing trumpet improvisation with spoken word and acting. The group has enjoyed long stints at theaters such as MC93 House of Culture in Paris, the Schaubühne and Volksbühne in Berlin, the Chekhov International Theatre Festival in Moscow, and Burgtheater in Vienna. He gave voice-melody performances in various museums and galleries, including the Jewish Museum, Berlin and Häusler Contemporary in Munich. In 2016 Brody was Artist in Residence for the Munich Kammerspiele Opera Department, where he played a singing roll on the trumpet for an experimental production of La Sonnambula. Brody is currently collaborating with Director David Marton for the Théâtre Vidy-Lausanne in Narcissus et Echo (2019-2020).

=== Composition and ensemble projects ===
In 2002, through a Berlin Council Arts Grant, Brody formed his best known ensemble, Paul Brody's Sadawi. The group has performed extensively in the United States, Canada, and Europe and has recorded seven albums for US-American, German, and Polish labels. Originally the group explored the crossroads of contemporary jazz and traditional klezmer. Jewish philosophers like Martin Buber, Abraham Joshua Heschel, and Walter Benjamin also inspired many of the compositions. They can be heard on the three albums recorded from 2002 to 2007 on the Tzadik Label.

Paul Brody is a remarkable trumpet player, composer, arranger based in Berlin [...] he brought together some of the best players from both the U.S. and Germany to create a new Jewish supergroup. The music combines exciting arrangements, catchy tunes, and compelling solos into another classic of the new Jewish Renaissance [...] Brody is forging a new Jewish jazz for the 21st Century.[...]

— John Zorn

In 2014 the group began exploring what Brody calls an "Indie Jazz cinematic sound" and signed with Enja Records. They recorded the album Behind All Words, dedicated to the poetry of Rose Ausländer. The CD presents extended compositional techniques with electronics, strings and vocals featuring Meret Becker, Clueso, and Jelena Kuljic. The CD won the Preis der Deutschen Schallplattenkritik Bestenliste in the "Grenzganger Kategory" (German Recording Prize Best of List 2014). Sadawi's second album on Enja, Vanishing Night, is inspired the by literaturary and theater works of Mary Cappello, Czesław Miłosz, and David Marton. Along with Sadawi, Brody has performed and recorded both solo and in collaboration with many artists, including John Zorn, Kent Nagano, Wim Wenders, Blixa Bargeld, Ari Benjamin Meyers, Orb, David Moss, Tony Buck, Shirley Bassey, Ran Blake, Alan Bern, Frank London, and Michael Rodach, Clueso, 17 Hippies, Semer Ensemble, The Other Europeans, Danial Kahn and The Painted Bird, Barry White and The Gincident.

In 2018 Brody composed an hour-long chamber music composition based on the voices of the translators at the Nurnbering Trial. Saal 600, directed by Kevin Barz, won second place at the Koerber Stiftung for Young Directors.

In 2020 Brody composed music for the Schauspiel Leipzig production of Brennende Erde (Directors: Dura & Hans-Werner Kroesinger). Along with using traditional instruments, Brody composed with samples of strip mining machines sounds, tractors, nature sounds, and church bells. Radio Mephisto wrote, 'Aber auch starke ästhetische Seiten gibt es an dem Abend, insbesondere die musikalischen Arbeit von Paul Brody. Unaufdringlich meistert er es, mit atmosphärischen Klängen und Soundinstallationen Bilder auf die Bühne zu zeichnen — auch zum Vorteil der Schauspielerinnen und Schauspieler.' (But there are also strong aesthetic aspects to the evening, especially the musical work of Paul Brody. Unobtrusively, he masters drawing pictures on the stage with atmospheric sounds and sound installations - also for the benefit of the actors and actresses.)

Brody's 2021 commissions include an opera for Opéra National de Lorraine. The libretto will be constructed from interviews with people living around the opera house, and the melodic material of the opera will be based on the voice-melodies of the interviewees. Brody's idea is that the city of Nancy writes its own libretto. Democratic Symphony (2021) is a commission by the Oldenburgisches Staatstheater. The work will be based on recent discussions that Mr. Barz chose from the German Parliament archives. The political debates will be transformed into a theatrical form on stage as part of the symphonic work.

== Radio productions (selection) ==
- WDR 'Musikselbermachen' Young people in music (2007-2008)
- SWR 'Klangküche' Young people in music (2010-2012)
- WDR Southern Discomfort -A Jew from Oklahoma (2014)
- WDR Most Wanted Poets, Escape from Alabama Prison (2016)
- WDR Grundgesetz -Cultural perspectives of German basic law (2017)
- Deutschlandradio -Radio Art: Talking Melody-Singing Story (2017)
- WDR Jazzy Diaspora - Oder: Die Geburt eines säkularen Juden (2019)

== Awards ==
- WDR 5 Lilipuz Lieblingslieder (Favorite Songs) (EMI Virgin Records) (2007)
- Preis der Deutschen Schallplattenkritik, Bestenliste (2015)
- International Radio Conference in Vienna featured guest (2016)
- Artist in Residence Kammerspiel (2016)
- Prix Europa Radio Broadcasting Festival: Talking Melody/Singing Story (2017)
- Artist in Residence University of Virginia (2018)
- University of Rhode Island Guest Artist Speaker (2018)
- Prix Europa Radio Broadcasting Festival: Jazzy Diaspora - Oder: Die Geburt eines säkularen Juden (2020)
- Artist in Residence -Museum Quartier Q21 Art Space, Vienna (2020)

== Discography ==
* Paul Brody Octet: "Turtle Paridise" (99 Records 1995)

- Detonation Orchestra: "Animals & Cowboys" (NRW Records 2002)
- Paul Brody's Tango Toy: "Laika Records" (Klezmer Stories 2010)
- Paul Brody's Tango Toy: "Laika Records" (South Klezmer Suite 2011)
- Arnold Dreyblatt And The Orchestra Of Excited Strings: "Animal Magnetism" (Tzadik Records 1988)
- Paul Brody's Sadawi: "Kabbalah Dream" (Tzadik Records 2002)
- Paul Brody's Sadawi: "Beyond Babylon" (Tzadik Records 2004)
- Paul Brody's Sadawi: "For the Moment" (Tzadik Records 2007)
- Bern, Brody, and Rodach: "Triophilia" (Jazzwerkstatt 2009)
- Paul Brody's Sadawi: "Far From Moldova" (Morgenland Label 2010)
- Paul Brody's Sadawi: "Behind All Words" (Enja Records 2013)
- Paul Brody's Sadawi: "Vanishing Night" (Enja Records 2017)

== Teaching ==
Musikschule Wedding Berlin (1998-2015) Hochschule für Musik Hanns Eisler Berlin (2009- 2014) Cracow Jewish Culture Festival (2010-2011) Yiddish Summer Weimar (2012-2013) University of Virginia Guest Artist Lecture (2018) Rhode Island University Guest Artist Lecture (2018)

== Bibliography ==
- Joachim-Ernst Berendt, Günther Huesmann: The Jazz Book: From Ragtime to the 21st Century. Chicago Review Press 2009, ISBN 1-613-7460-40.
- Magdalena Waligorska: Klezmer's Afterlife: An Ethnography of the Jewish Music Revival in Poland and Germany. Oxford University Press 2013, ISBN 0-199-9958-0X, S. 169.
