= Anthony Russell (American singer) =

American singer and musician (born 1980)

Anthony Mordechai Tzvi Russell
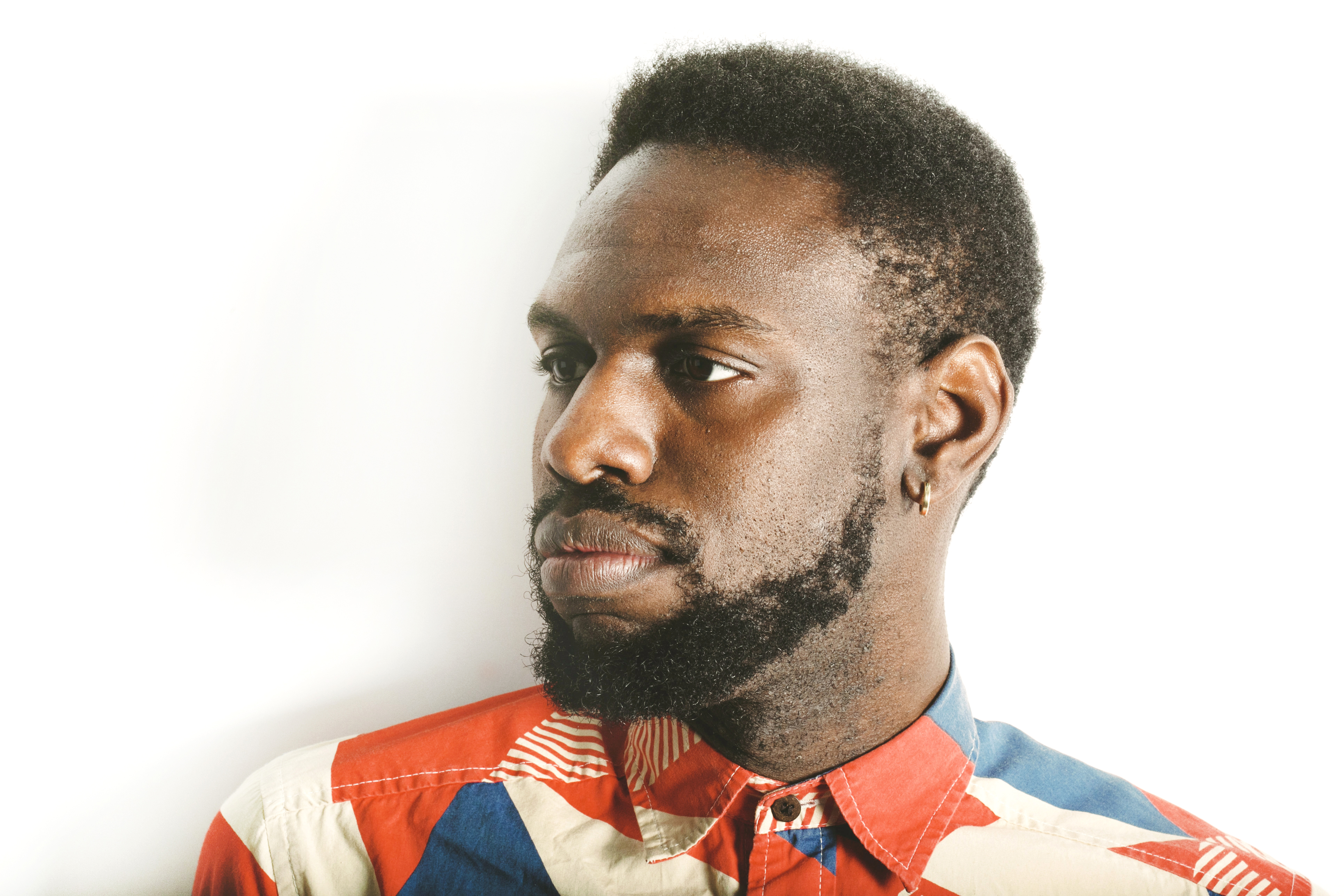

Background information
- Born: 1980 (age 45–46); Fort Worth, Texas
- Genres: Yiddish, klezmer, Jewish music, African-American music, opera
- Years active: 2012–present
- Website: www.anthonyrussellbass.com

Anthony Mordechai Tzvi Russell is an American singer and musician who performs in Yiddish. He is an African-American convert to Judaism.

== Early life and education ==
Russell was born in 1979 in Fort Worth, Texas to a Christian family, moving around frequently as a military brat as his father was in the US Navy. When Russell was seven, his family settled in Vallejo, California. Encouraged by his mother, a former classical piano student, Russell gained a deep interest in music. He describes himself as an autodidact, teaching himself to read and play music, and gaining a detailed knowledge of the Bible. He was homeschooled from 5th grade.

He earned a degree in music at Holy Names University in Oakland, California.

== Career ==
After graduating from Holy Names University, he began a career as a bass opera singer in San Francisco and New York. His professional debut was in the world premiere of Appomattox by Philip Glass. He has stated that formerly he deliberately avoided singing Negro spirituals to avoid stereotypes of African-American classical singers. After converting to Judaism, Russell considered studying to become a cantor, but ultimately decided against it. He encountered the Yiddish song "Dem Milners Trern" ("The Miller's Tears") while watching the film A Serious Man, which led to him researching the work of singer Sidor Belarsky and early 20th century Jewish music. He has cited Paul Robeson and Josephine Baker as personal inspirations.

In January 2012, Russell was invited to perform at the Sholem Aleichem Cultural Center in the Bronx, New York. There, he met Yiddish vaudevillian Shane Baker, who invited him to be a guest performer at the Manhattan JCC, jumpstarting his career. In 2017, Russell won Der Yidisher Idol, a Yiddish singing competition inspired by American Idol.

In addition to his performance of traditional Yiddish art song, Russell has blended traditional African-American and Ashkenazi music to create his own musical style. He sometimes performs in a duo called Tsvey Brider ("Two Brothers") with pianist/accordionist Dmitri Gaskin. He also collaborated with the klezmer group Veretski Pass on a project called "Convergence".

He has had performances in Yiddish both in the US and internationally, including in Toronto, Montreal, Mexico City, Berlin, Warsaw, Krakow, Gdansk, Symphony Space in New York City, the Kennedy Center in Washington DC and Limmud Fests across the United States and Europe.

He is the 2023 Stroum Lecturer at the University of Washington.

== Personal life ==
Russell is openly gay.

He met his husband, Rabbi Michael Rothbaum, in 2007, on a date at a New York Mets game in Queens, New York. At the age of 27, Russell attended his first Shabbat prayer service and started attending a local Conservative synagogue and celebrating Jewish holidays. He formally converted in January 2011, taking the name Mordechai Tzvi. He traveled to Israel, where he studied Yiddish at Tel Aviv University. They were married in a Jewish ceremony in June 2015. Russell lived in Massachusetts from 2017 to 2022 and since 2022 lives in Atlanta, Georgia.

== Discography ==
- City of the Future (2014) with Hot Pstromi, Yale Strom, Michael Alpert, Judy Bressler, Vira Lozinsky, Elizabeth Schwartz, Daniel Kahn and Jack Falk
- Convergence (2018) with Veretski Pass (Cookie Segelstein, Joshua Horowitz, Stuart Brotman, featuring John Santos)
- Kosmopolitn (2022, with Tsvey Brider and Baymele) (Borscht Beat)
