= Beyond the Pale (Brave Old World album) =

Studio album by Brave Old World
- Released: 1994
- Genre: Klezmer
- Label: Rounder
- Producer: Frank Dostal

Brave Old World chronology
Klezmer Music (1990)	Beyond the Pale (1994)	Blood Oranges (1999)

Beyond the Pale is an album by the klezmer band Brave Old World, released in 1994. The album title refers to the Pale of Settlement.

== Production ==
The album was produced by Frank Dostal. It contains original songs as well as interpretations of traditional Yiddish songs. Founding member Joel Rubin departed the band prior to the recording sessions. The opening and closing tracks, about the fall of the Berlin Wall, were written in 1990.

"Rufn Di Kinder Aheym" ("Calling the Children Home") was inspired by the New Orleans cornetist Buddy Bolden. A cimbalom was employed on "Yismekhu". "Di Sapozhkelekh" used the Misheberak scale. Leon Schwartz taught the band a few of Beyond the Pale's songs.

== Critical reception ==
Professional ratings
Review scores
Source	Rating
AllMusic	4/5 stars
MusicHound World: The Essential Album Guide	4.5/5 stars

The Globe and Mail wrote that "the dance tunes are as irresistible as ever, but the underlying spirit is not chutzpah or even nostalgia so much as a deep sadness and urgent compassion." The Washington Post concluded that "much of the recording might be described as a meditation on the art of playing klezmer music in the Berlin of the 1990s, and the mixed feelings such an experience would necessarily call up."

AllMusic called the album "appropriately reflective klezmer from Germany, where even the high-spirited freylekhs have a somber edge and Kurt Bjorling's probing clarinet is part accusatory finger, part triumph of intellect and love over will."

== Track listing ==
No.	Title	Length
1.	"Berlin Overture"
2.	"Brave Old Hora"
3.	"Basarabye"
4.	"Big Train"
5.	"Waltz Roman à Clef"
6.	"Borsht"
7.	"Oy, di Dreydlekh"
8.	"Di Sapozhkelekh"
9.	"Yismekhu"
10.	"A Tish-Nign"
11.	"Bobover Wedding March"
12.	"Rufn di Kinder Aheym"
13.	"Doina Extravaganza"
14.	"Berlin 1990"
