= Margot Leverett =

American clarinet player

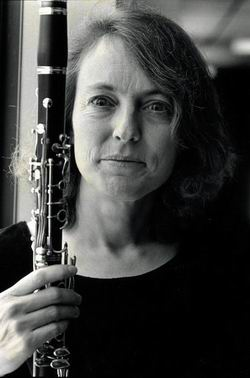
Margot Leverett

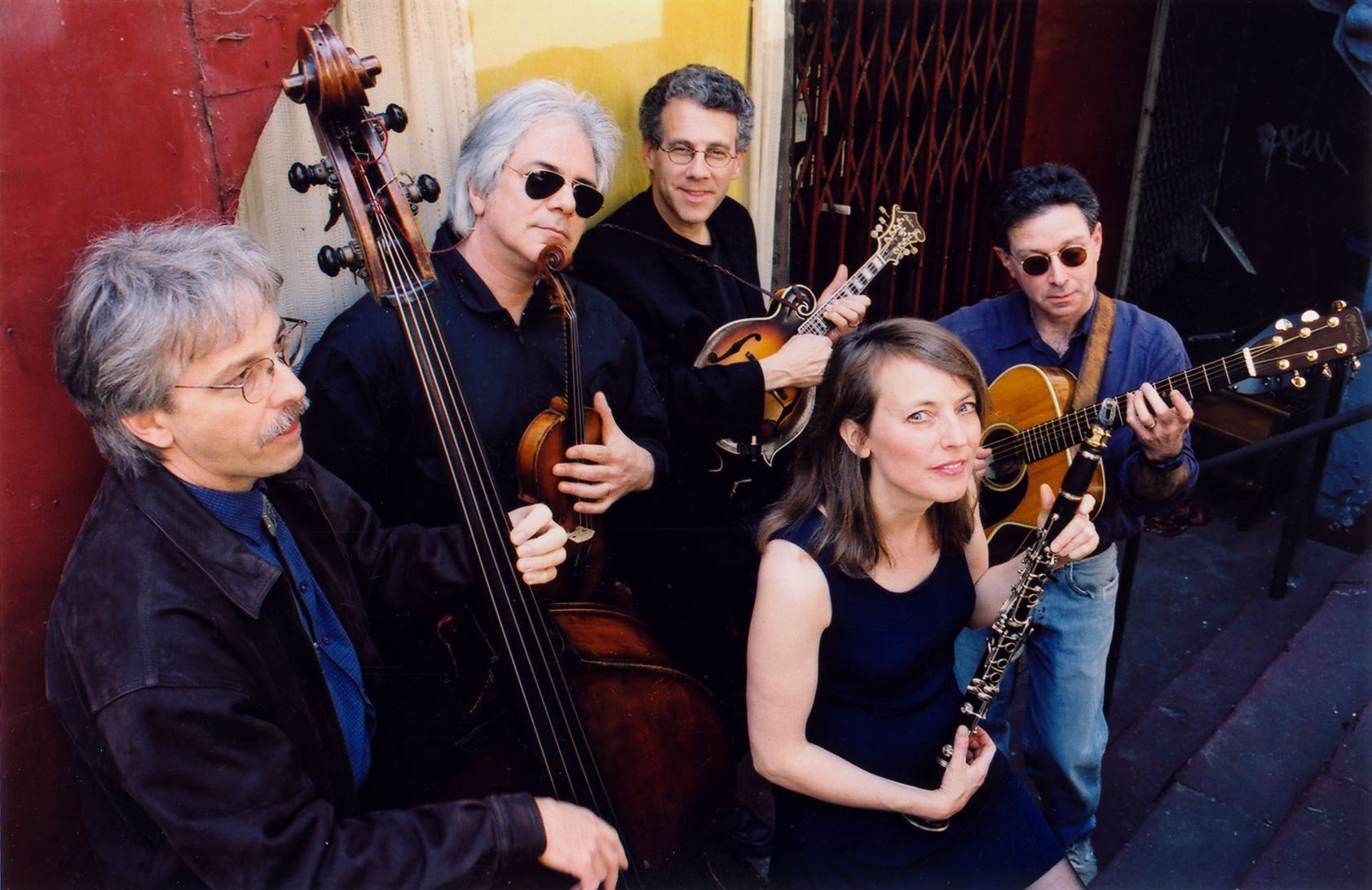
Klezmer Mountain Boys with Margot Leverett

Margot Leverett is a New York City-based clarinettist. Born in Ohio, she lived in Pittsburgh, Pennsylvania and Buffalo, New York before studying at Indiana University School of Music. At Indiana University, she was classically trained. Leverett later became interested in klezmer, a traditional musical style of the Jews of Eastern Europe. She studied with klezmer clarinettist Sidney Beckerman and was a founding member of The Klezmatics in 1985. The Klezmatics, a band associated with the Klezmer revival would later become the first klezmer band to win a Grammy Award.

In 1999, Leverett was a founding member of another klezmer band of all women musicians called Mikveh. They released a self-titled album in 2001, described by Rambles magazine as "a potent and heady mix of passion and power." Leverett left the band when she began her solo career and founded "Margot Leverett and the Klezmer Mountain Boys".

Leverett's solo album, called The Art of Klezmer Clarinet, was released in 2001. The 17-track album was favorably reviewed—Klezmershack.com called it a "tribute to greats of the American Klezmer clarinet" and a "tremendous leap in skill and soulfulness." "She achieves the nearly impossible feat of rendering the music with authenticity and respect, while simultaneously making a highly personal statement about the art of klezmer clarinet- the instrument and its history."

In 2001, Leverett founded the group Margot Leverett and the Klezmer Mountain Boys, which fuses the styles of klezmer and bluegrass. The group was filled with outstanding musicians, Barry Mitterhoff, Kenny Kosek, Joe Selly and Marty Confurius. Margot Leverett and the Klezmer Mountain Boys released two albums: a self-titled album in 2002 and an album called Second Avenue Square Dance. The group was featured by the Paul Taylor Dance Company in a piece entitled "Klezmerbluegrass".

Leverett has been a guest soloist for the Philadelphia Orchestra. She has taught at many klezmer camps, including KlezKamp, KlezKanada and KlezmerQuerque. She continues to teach, guest lecture, and perform.

== See also ==
- Andy Statman
- Klezmer Conservatory Band
