= Veretski Pass (band) =

American Klezmer band

Veretski Pass is a klezmer trio using traditional instrumentation of accordion, violin, cimbalom and bowed double bass. They are based in the United States, and are named after Verecke Pass, the mountain pass through which Magyar tribes crossed into the Carpathian basin to settle what later became the Austro-Hungarian Empire. Members of this group have previously played in other Klezmer groups such as Budowitz and Brave Old World.

The band's music has a mix of Carpathian, Jewish, Romanian, Ottoman, Moldavian, Bessarabian, and Polish influences, amongst others.

They performed at the Concertgebouw Concert Hall in Amsterdam in March 2006.

== Band members ==
- Cookie Segelstein (violin, viola)
- Stuart Brotman (bass, basy, baraban, Carpathian flute)
- Joshua Horowitz (tsimbl, accordion)

== Discography ==
- 2004 Veretski Pass (Golden Horn Records)
- 2008 Trafik (Golden Horn Records)
- 2011 The Klezmer Shul (Golden Horn Records)
- 2015, with Joel Rubin Poyln, A Gilgul (Golden Horn Records)
- 2019, with Joel Rubin The Magid Chronicles (Golden Horn Records), based on the work of Sofia Magid

== See also ==
- Klezmer
- Budowitz
- Verecke Pass
- Anthony Russell (American singer)
