= Budowitz =

Klezmer band

- Origin: Hungary
- Genres: Klezmer

Budowitz are a klezmer band incorporating 19th century instruments and themes from the folk music of Bessarabia, Galicia and Bukovina, into their music. Its members live in Hungary, Germany and the United States. The band is named after 19th Century accordion maker Karl Budowitz , who built the accordion played by Joshua Horowitz in the group.

They have won a number of awards including BBC's Critics Circle award for best CD and the British Songlines Magazine's "Top of the World" award.

== Members who have played at various times ==
- Christian Dawid - Clarinet
- Tamas Gombai - Violin
- Joshua Horowitz - Cimbalom (Tsimbl) and Accordion
- Walt Mahovlich - Clarinet
- Michael Winograd - Clarinet
- Steven Greenman - Violin
- Lothar Lasser - Accordion
- Geza Penzes - Cello and Bass
- Zsolt Kurtosi - Cello and Bass
- Cookie Segelstein - Violin and Viola
- Sandor Toth - 3-stringed Contra Viola
- Merlin Shepherd - C and E♭ clarinets

== Discography ==
- Mother Tongue (1997)
- Wedding without a Bride (2000)
- Budowitz Live (2007)

== See also ==
- Veretski Pass (band)
