= Hillel Noah Maggid =

Historian

Hillel Noah Maggid (1829-1903) (also known as Hillel Steinschneider) was a Russian-Jewish genealogist and historian.

== Biography ==
A descendant of Rabbi Saul "Wahl" Katzenellenbogen; he was born at Vilna in 1829. His father, Rabbi Shalom Israel Maggid, was also a bibliographer. His grandfather, Phinehas [Pinchas, "Maggid Tzedek"] was rabbi at Polotsk and Vilna, and the emissary of Elijah of Vilna in his struggle with the Hasidim, and the author of nine exegetical works. Having lost his father at the age of eighteen, Maggid learned the calling of a lapidary, but not content with cutting epitaphs on tombstones and monuments, he occasionally composed inscriptions.

He early joined the Progressionists of Vilna, among whom were Samuel Joseph Fuenn, Lebensohn, and M. A. Günzburg. He indulged his taste for general literature and published various articles and bibliographical papers in the current Hebrew periodicals. Among these may be noted his biography of David Oppenheim, rabbi of Prague (in "Gan Peraḥim", 1882), and his notes on the history of the Jewish community of Lemberg (in "Anshe Shem", 1895). Maggid also collaborated with Fuenn in the latter's history of the Jewish community of Vilna ("Ḳiryah Ne'emanah"). Maggid's most important work was "Ir Wilna", the first volume of which appeared in Vilna in 1900; it contains the biographies of more than three hundred prominent rabbis, preachers, and communal workers. The notes alone, referring to genealogical literature, show that the author was familiar with responsa literature as well as with general rabbinical and historical works in Hebrew literature. Maggid left in manuscript two other volumes, containing biographies of the important scholars and communal workers of Vilna in more recent times. The third volume contains also new material for the history of the Jews in Vilna and Lithuania, and includes numerous documents hitherto unpublished. A sketch of his life was written by Ben 'Ammi in his "Ocherki o Litvye" (in "Voskhod"). Maggid's son was David Maggid of St. Petersburg, author of "Toledot Mishpat", and his granddaughter Sofia Magid was an ethnographer and folklorist in the Soviet era.

Maggid died in Vilna on October 29, 1903.

== Bibliography ==
- Halpern, in Sbornik Budushchnost, iv. 249, St. Petersburg, 1904;
- Voskhod, Nov., 1903.
