= Man of Grease =

2000 Canadian documentary film

- Directed by: Ezra Soiferman
- Written by: Ezra Soiferman
- Produced by: Ezra Soiferman
- Starring: Tony Koulakis
- Edited by: Mika Goodfriend
- Music by: Josh Dolgin
- Release date: August 28, 2000 (MWFF)
- Running time: 50 minutes
- Country: Canada
- Language: English

Man of Grease is a Canadian documentary film, directed by Ezra Soiferman and released in 2000. The film is a portrait of Tony Koulakis, a Greek immigrant who was the longtime owner of the Cosmos diner in the Notre-Dame-de-Grâce borough of Montreal, Quebec, as he begins his preparations to retire and hand over ownership of the restaurant to his son Nikos and daughter Niki.

The film's title was selected as a pun, referencing both Koulakis's Greek heritage and the grease associated with cooking food in a diner.

== Distribution ==
The film premiered at the Montreal World Film Festival on August 28, 2000, and was screened at other film festivals before having a brief commercial run in 2001.

It was later released on DVD in 2011.

A sequel film, with the working title The Holy Grill, was in the works at the time of Koulakis's official retirement in 2002, although there is no known record of its completion or release.

== Awards ==
The film was a Jutra Award nominee for Best Documentary Film at the 3rd Jutra Awards in 2001.

== Followup ==
Several years after Tony Koulakis's retirement, he was stabbed to death in 2013, with his son Yannis convicted of murder and sentenced to nine years in prison in 2016.

Nikos and Niki Koulakis retained ownership of the restaurant until putting it up for sale in 2020.
