= Sofia Magid =

Soviet ethnographer

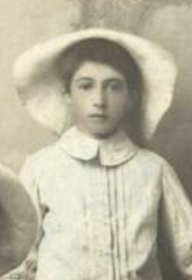
Image of Sofia Magid

Sofia Magid (София Давидовна Магид-Экмекчи Sofiya Davidovna Magid-Ékmekchi, c. 1892–1954) was a Soviet Jewish ethnographer and folklorist whose career lasted from the 1920s to the 1950s. Among the materials she collected were folksongs of Volhynian and Belarusian Jews and among the only prewar field recordings of European klezmer string ensembles, as well as the music of Russians and other ethnic groups of the USSR. Although she was largely unknown abroad during her lifetime, in recent years she has been seen alongside Moshe Beregovski and other Soviet Jewish ethnographers as an important scholar and collector of Jewish music.

== Biography ==
=== Early life ===
Sofia Magid was born on December 22, 1892 (January 3, 1893 New Style) to a Jewish family in Saint Petersburg, Russian Empire. Her mother, Chana Tzivia (née Dorman) was a dentist and her father, David Gilelevich Magid, was a writer and librarian. Her grandfather Hillel Noah Maggid was a genealogist and historian. In 1909, Sofia graduated from secondary school in Saint Petersburg and entered the Saint Petersburg Conservatory in 1912 to study piano. She graduated in 1917 and started to work as a music teacher.

=== Academic career ===
In 1922 Magid pursued further studies in musicology and started to work as an assistant in folklore research. In 1928 she was in a small working group, along with Susman Kiselgof and other veterans of the pre-Soviet Society for Jewish Folk Music, to establish a more organized body to collect and study Jewish folklore. She made her first folklore collecting expedition to the Volhynia region in 1928, and revisited the region again in 1930 and 1931. After 1931 she worked as a sound archive assistant in the Folklore department of the Academy of Sciences of the Soviet Union. That same year, she prepared a song anthology for publication titled "Folksongs and Instrumental Music of the Ukrainian Jews," but it was never published.

After 1932 she stopped working as a music teacher and dedicated herself completely to folkloric field work, not only of Jewish music, but also of the music of Azerbaijan, Kurdistan, Armenia, and other areas. She was collecting Jewish folk music at the same time as her more well-known counterpart Moshe Beregovski, but apparently the two never met. After gaining a high profile for her work, she was given a permanent position in 1934 as a senior research assistant in the Folklore section of the Institute of Anthropology and Ethnography. That year she prepared another song anthology for publication, consisting of Russian Revolutionary songs from 1890 to 1905, but it too was never published.

In the winter of 1936 she started to prepare to write her dissertation about Ballads in Jewish folklore, and she visited Belarus and Ukraine to do research. She finished writing it in 1938 and successfully defended it in 1939.

In 1941 she managed to publish an anthology of songs of Belarusian Jews. After the Nazi invasion of Russia, she was dismissed from her academic position due to budget cuts, and spent time aiding in the defense of Leningrad before being evacuated to Kazakhstan in 1943. While there, she did research on Kazakh music.

In 1944, she was able to return to Leningrad, and resumed her academic position in 1946. By May 1948 she was promoted to main research assistant in the area of Russian Folklore.

After 1950 she left her academic post and spent her last years doing research for the Union of Soviet Composers in Leningrad. There, she did research into the use of Russian folk materials in composition and into field research which had been done in Leningrad Oblast in 1951–2.

Magid died in 1954. She was buried in the Preobrazhénskoye Jewish cemetery in Saint Petersburg.

== Legacy ==
Many of the materials collected by Magid are now preserved in the Vernadsky National Library of Ukraine, although some are in the collections of the Pushkin House in Saint Petersburg.

Although she was little known outside of the Soviet Union during her lifetime, in recent years Magid has increasingly received attention from scholars of Jewish music. The field recordings collection at the Pushkin House, including those of Magid, were assessed and digitized by a Dutch academic team led by Tjeerd de Graaf from 1999 to 2002. In 2006, scholar Leonid Guralnik used Magid's unpublished work on Yiddish ballads, as well as her audio recordings and transcriptions, to further develop an analysis of Yiddish vocal folklore. Much of her collected material was published as part of a German book in 2008, titled "Unser Rebbe, unser Stalin - ": jiddische Lieder aus den St. Petersburger Sammlungen von Moishe Beregowski (1892-1961) und Sofia Magid (1892-1954). And in 2020, Michael Lukin used parts of her collected material to once again examine the Yiddish ballad.

Her field work have also been interpreted by klezmer musicians in recent years. Zisl Slepovitch, who is originally from Belarus and now based in New York City, included material collected by Magid in his bands Minsker Kapelye and Litvakus. And in 2019 Joel Rubin and the group Veretski Pass released an album interpreting work Magid collected, called The Magid Chronicles.

The band WAKS from Hamburg, Germany (Inge Mandos, Klemens Kaatz, Hans-Christian Jaenicke) has incorporated original voices from Sofia Magid's wax cylinder recordings into new arrangements. These recordings were sourced from Elvira Grözinger’s book Unser Rebbe unser Stalin . Across all three albums so far, Inge Mandos sings together with the historical voices. The two albums WAKS and OVES (2015, 2019) are based on ten Yiddish songs recorded by Sofia Magid. The third album, "Sofias Reisen – di Rayzes fun Sofia" (2026), contains 13 songs from the Magid collection and is a tribute to Magid’s work.
