= Wolf Krakowski =

Canadian musician (born 1947)

- Born: 1947 (age 78–79); Saalfelden Farmach, Austria
- Origin: Toronto, Canada
- Genres: Blues
- Occupations: Musician, carpenter, luthier
- Instruments: Singing, guitar
- Label: Kame'a Media
- Website: kamea.com

Wolf Krakowski (born 1947) is a Polish-Canadian Yiddish-speaking songwriter, singer, and guitarist. He was born at Saalfelden Farmach, an Austrian camp for displaced persons, where his parents, who were Polish Jews who survived the Holocaust in Russia, lived for a short while after World War II. Soon afterwards they moved to Sweden, and the small town of Eskilstuna, where the family stayed until 1954 when they moved to Toronto, Ontario, Canada.

As a young man Krakowski took to the road, working with the Conklin and Garrett Shows carnival and later toured for some time with blues-singer Big Joe Williams. He worked with street theatre, and as a carpenter and guitar-builder for many years. In 1994-1995 he worked as a videographer for the Survivors of the Shoah Visual History Foundation, documenting the testimonies of over one hundred Holocaust survivors. In 1996 he released the CD Transmigrations/Gilgul on his own record label, Kame'a Media. On this record he presented traditional Yiddish songs in a blues–rock–reggae vein. Among the traditional songs and credited compositions Krakowski reshaped here were: Shabes, Shabes, Friling (Springtime) and Zol Shoyn Kumen Di Geule (Let the Redemption Come), all sung by Krakowski in his first language, Yiddish. On this record, and on those that followed, he was accompanied by The Lonesome Brothers, starring roots-rock veterans, multi-instrumentalist Jim Armenti and bass guitarist Ray Mason.

Krakowski made a considerable impact in world music circles with this record, and the rights to it were taken over some years later by the well-known avant-garde recording company Tzadik, led by saxophonist John Zorn, who in 2002 released Krakowski's second CD in Yiddish: Goyrl: Destiny.

Between these records, Krakowski himself also released the CD Unbounded (on Kamea Media), on which he sings some of his own songs in English. In 2006, Krakowski and Jim Armenti produced the CD "Di Alte Kashe" (The Eternal Question: Fraidy Katz Sings Yiddish), also on Kame'a Media.

Krakowski lives in Northampton, Massachusetts, United States.
