= Basy =

Basy Басы
- Selo
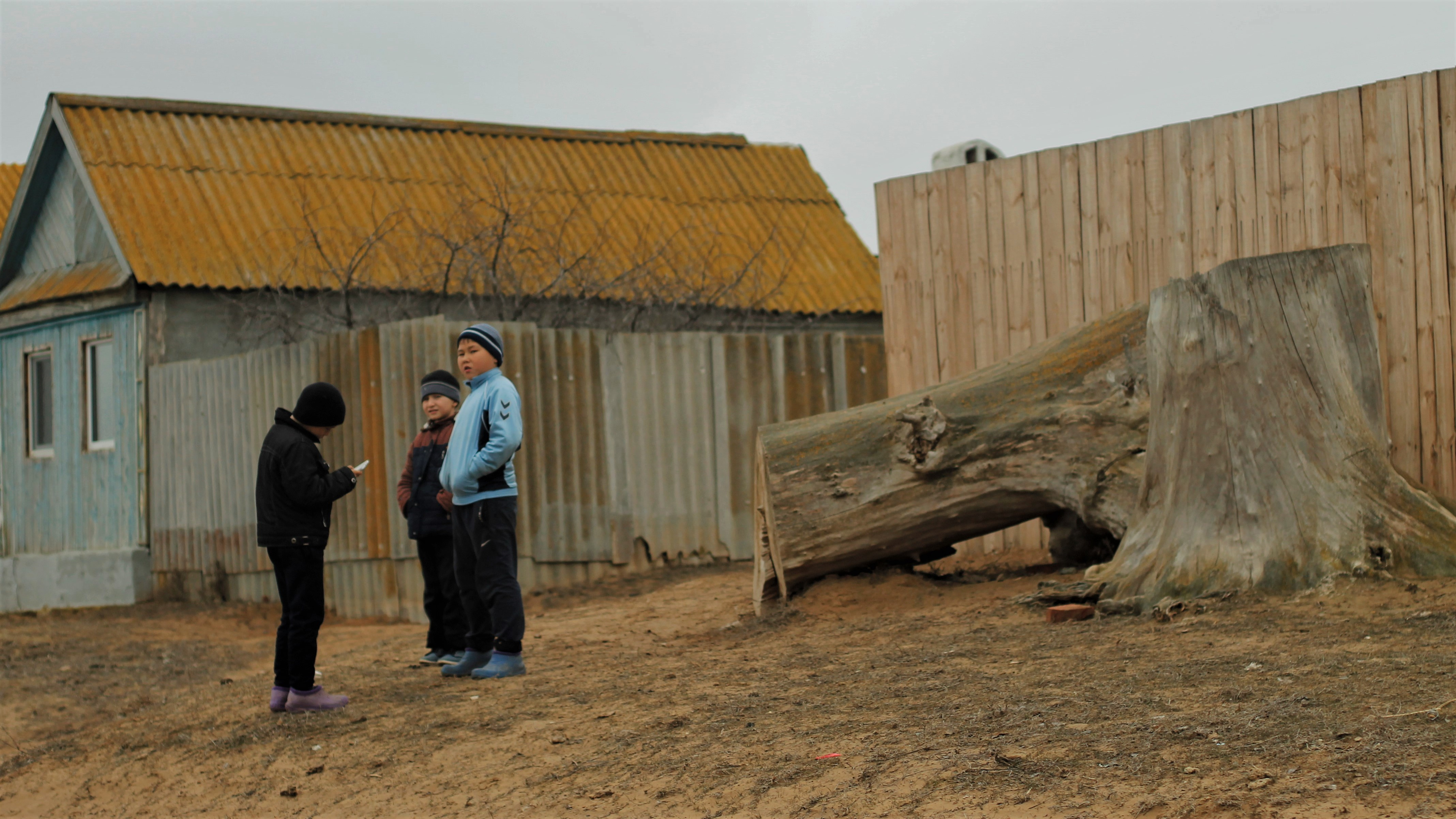

- Location within Astrakhan Oblast Location within Russia
- Coordinates: 46°07′N 47°08′E
- Country: Russia
- Region: Astrakhan Oblast
- District: Limansky District
- Time zone: UTC+4:00

Basy (Russian: Басы) is a rural locality (a selo) and the administrative center of Basinsky Selsoviet, Limansky District, Astrakhan Oblast, Russia. The population was 997 as of 2010. There are 19 streets.

== Demographics ==
=== Ethnic composition ===
As of 2002, ethnic Russians and Chechens were the two largest groups in the village.

Ethnicity	Number	Percentage
Russians	592	47,4%
Chechens	397	31,79%
Dargins	91	7,29%
Kazakhs	89	7,13%
Kalmyks	41	3,28%
Kumyks	16	1,28%
Nogais	12	0,96%
Mari	4	0,32%
Germans	4	0,32%
Ukrainians	3	0,24%
Total	1249	100%

== Geography ==
Basy is located 45 km north of Liman (the district's administrative centre) by road. Basinsk is the nearest rural locality.
