= Alan Bern =

American musician and educator

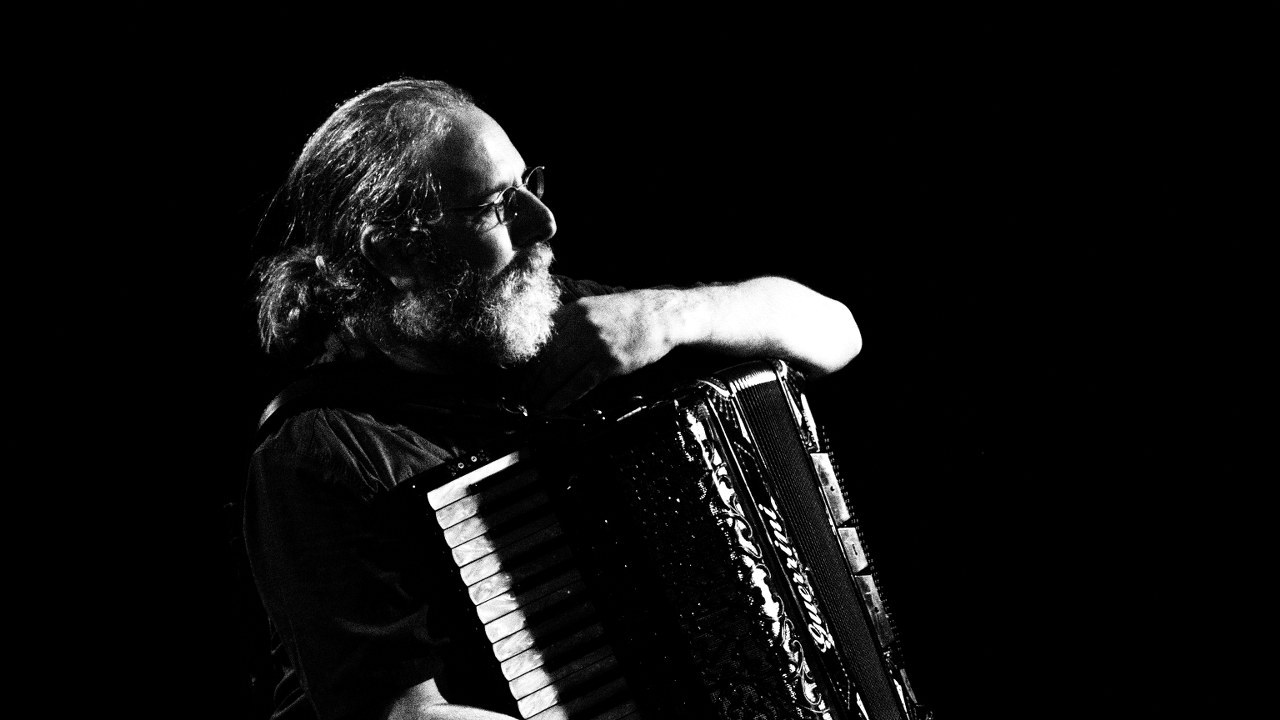
- Alan Bern 2018 by Andreas Welskop

Background information
- Born: 1955 (age 70–71); Bloomington, Indiana, United States
- Genres: klezmer
- Occupations: Musician, educator, composer, activist
- Instruments: accordion, piano

Alan Bern (Bloomington, Indiana, 1955) is an American composer, pianist, accordionist, educator and cultural activist, based in Berlin since 1987. He is the founding artistic director of Yiddish Summer Weimar and the Other Music Academy (OMA). He is internationally recognized for his contributions to the research, dissemination and creative renewal of Jewish music with Brave Old World, The Other Europeans and the Semer Ensemble, among others. He is the creator of Present-Time Composition, a musical and educational approach informed by cognitive science that integrates the methods of improvisation and composition. In 2016 he received the Weimar Prize in recognition of major cultural contributions to the city of Weimar. In 2017 he was awarded the Order of Merit of the Free State of Thuringia, and in 2022 he was awarded the Order of Merit of the Federal Republic of Germany.

== Education ==
Bern attended University High School. He received a B.A. cum laude in Religious Studies from Indiana University Bloomington (1976), an M.A. in Philosophy under Daniel Dennett from Tufts University (1983) and a D.M.A in Music Composition under Joel Hoffman from the College-Conservatory of Music, University of Cincinnati (2006).

In addition to his formal education, Bern studied classical piano with Sidney Foster, Paul Badura-Skoda and Leonard Shure and chamber music with Josef Gingold and György Sebök. He studied jazz with David Baker at Indiana University Bloomington and Improvisation with Ran Blake at the New England Conservatory. At the Creative Music Studio in Woodstock, New York, he studied contemporary music with John Cage, Frederic Rzewski, Anthony Braxton, the Art Ensemble of Chicago, Carla Bley and Karl Berger, among many others.

== Music projects ==
As a musician and band leader, Bern is best known as co-founder of Brave Old World, founder of Diaspora Redux, The Other Europeans, and the Semer Ensemble. He has also performed and recorded with the Klezmer Conservatory Band, Andy Statman, Bern, Brody & Rodach, Guy Klucevsek, the Accordion Tribe, The Klezmatics, Itzhak Perlman, Alpen Klezmer and Voices of Ashkenaz, among many others.

In 2016-17 he composed a song cycle based on children’s poems by the Polish-Jewish poet, Kadya Molodovsky. The song cycle was the centerpiece of the Kadya Choir project (www.kadya.eu), which brought together a girls choir from Weimar (Schola Cantorum Weimar) with a girls choir from Tel Aviv-Jaffa (Voices of Peace Choir) and is the subject of a feature-length documentary film The Young Kadyas that has been shown in German theaters and at international film festivals (https://www.1meter60-film.de/film-detail/die-jungen-kadyas/).

== Weimar-based projects ==
Beginning in 1999, Bern’s activities have increasingly been centered in Weimar, Germany. He is artistic director of Yiddish Summer Weimar, the Other Music Academy (OMA), the OMA Improvisation Project, the OMA Middle Eastern Music & Cultures Project, and Weimar klingt!, among others, as well as chair of Other Music Academy e.V., the non-profit organization responsible for those projects.

=== Yiddish Summer Weimar (YSW) ===
Bern is founding artistic director of Yiddish Summer Weimar, a five-week summer institute and festival in Weimar, Germany. Currently, it is the longest and most intensive program for the research, dissemination and creative renewal of Yiddish culture in the world. YSW annually attracts students, artists, educators and audiences from more than 20 countries to its workshops, concerts, lectures and symposia, new music, dance and theater projects, jam sessions and more.

Bern’s artistic direction gives equal weight to subject matter and pedagogical approach. YSW explores the subject of Yiddish culture as an ongoing, fundamentally intercultural process that is part of a complex matrix of European and non-European cultures. Its pedagogical approach emphasizes experiential learning, embodied knowledge, diversity and social interaction, and the complementarity of artistic, scientific and social creativity. Bern’s vision of YSW as a non-authoritarian, international and diverse learning community has been strongly influenced by the principles of Ted Sizer and the Coalition of Essential Schools.

Yiddish Summer Weimar has received awards from the European Union, the European Commission, the German Music Council, the German Federal Cultural Foundation, among others.

=== Other Music Academy e.V. ===
Bern is founding chair of Other Music Academy e.V., a non-profit organization with more than 100 members worldwide. Founded in 2006 to carry out Yiddish Summer Weimar, its mission has expanded to include the Other Music Academy and all of its projects.

=== The Other Music Academy (OMA) ===
In 2009, the city of Weimar gave Other Music Academy e.V. a 33-year lease on an abandoned school building in Ernst-Kohl-Strasse 23 to be a base for the organization's projects and activities. Bern envisioned for the building a new kind of institution dedicated to the inclusion and empowerment of widely diverse social groups, through cooperative participation in transdisciplinary projects that combine artistic, scientific and social/political practices.

The OMA is also the home for all of the current projects of Other Music Academy e.V., including Yiddish Summer, the Improvisation Project, the Open Café, the Middle Eastern Music and Cultures Project, and more.

The OMA building is undergoing renovation parallel to the development of the OMA organizational structure. Presently, the OMA physical space comprises artist ateliers, workshop spaces, a music café and a small concert space. The OMA organizational structure will eventually comprise three, interlocking parts: i) a Creation Tank, where projects are conceived and managed, ii) a Curriculum of learning goals and tasks which flow directly from the projects, and iii) a Social Center, including the OMA Café, which encourages interaction among all project participants. A 300 m^{2} space is currently being developed as a larger workshop and performance space.

The OMA has received recognition and support from the German Federal Cultural Foundation, the City of Weimar and the State Chancellery of Thuringia, among others.

== Present-Time Composition (PTC) ==
Bern is the creator of Present-Time Composition, a musical and educational approach informed by cognitive science that integrates the methods of improvisation and composition. He has taught workshops in PTC at the University of Cincinnati, the Conservatory of Music Franz Liszt (Weimar), to members of the Pittsburgh Symphony and members of the Lyon Symphony, at the University of Arnhem, the Royal Conservatory of Antwerp, the University of Virginia, the Joseph Haydn Conservatory (Eisenstadt), at the Exploratorium Berlin, through the International Yehudi Menuhin Foundation, in the context of Winter Edition (Weimar) and the OMA Improvisation Project, among many others. The fundamental principle of PTC is that highly complex musical decisions, normally thought to be the domain of composition, can be improvised in real time and communicated within a group, to produce a collectively improvised composition that is aesthetically comparable with music composed traditionally by individuals. This involves extensive training with step-by-step exercises that teach the musician how to reduce increasingly complex musical perceptions to apparently simple and immediate impulses. Currently, Bern is in the process of developing a certification program for PTC.

== Activities in theater and dance ==
Bern is active as a composer and music director for theater and dance productions. Between 1994-96 he was Music Director at the Bremen Municipal Theater, where he composed and directed music for productions of Angels in America, The Threepenny Opera and Midsummer Night's Dream, among others. As a free-lancer, he has composed and directed music for theater productions at the Grillo Theater (Essen), the Maxim Gorki Theater (Berlin), the German National Theater (Weimar), the Municipal Theater of Dortmund, and the Luzern Municipal Theater, among others. He has worked with directors Josha Sobol, Silvia Armbruster, Constanza Lauterbach, Charlie Risse and Christian Friedrich, among others. In 1992, he created a score based exclusively on music composed in the Vilnius Ghetto for Josha Sobol’s own production of his play "Ghetto" in Essen. In 2001, he directed music for the first production of The Threepenny Opera in Yiddish translation by Michael Wex, directed at the Saidye Bronfman Center for the Arts in of Montreal by Bryna Wasserman.

Bern also composes music for contemporary dance, including for the Eliza Miller Dance Company production of "Sideways" and "Märchen" in New York (2002), for which he was given an award by the Mary Flagler Carey Trust.

In 2019 he composed and co-wrote the libretto with Yuri Vedenyapin for Di megile fun Vaymar, an original music theater work that confronts Itzik Manger’s Megile lider with texts by Goethe and other authors, and the work was performed that year during Yiddish Summer Weimar (https://vimeo.com/687612210). In 2022 he composed Glikl-oratorye (Glikl Oratorio: A HerStory) to a libretto in four languages (Old Yiddish, Eastern Yiddish, German and English) by Diana Matut, based on the memoirs of Glikl of Hameln. The oratorio was created in cooperation with the Hochschule für Musik Franz Liszt Weimar and performed by music students from throughout Germany in late April and early March 2022 in Weimar, Erfurt and Halle (https://www.glikl.eu).

== Other professional activities ==
Bern has been on the faculty of Tufts University, the New England Conservatory and the College-Conservatory of Music, University of Cincinnati. He has been a guest lecturer at Indiana University, the University of Virginia, Pittsburgh University, Carnegie Mellon University, the Conservatory of Music Franz Liszt (Weimar), the School of Oriental and African Studies (University of London), the University of Arnhem, the University of Mainz, and the Belvedere Musik Gymnasium (Weimar), among others.

He was Music Director for London KlezFest in the mid 2000s, and has taught on the faculty of Klezkanada, Klezkamp (New York), Moscow KlezFest, the International Klezmer Festival Fürth, the Jewish Culture Festival in Kraków, the Singer Festival in Warsaw, and many others.

== Recordings and films ==
Bern has been featured on many audio recordings and films. The list below represents a selection:

- Brave Old World
  - Klezmer Music
  - Beyond the Pale
  - Blood Oranges
  - Bless the Fire
  - Dus gezang fin geto Lodz/Song of the Lodz Ghetto
  - Hoffman's Doina, with Alex Jacobowitz single work released as CD in 2019
  - Live in Concert (Film/DVD, directed by David Kaufman)
  - Song of the Lodz Ghetto (Film/DVD, directed by David Kaufman)
  - The New Klezmorim (Film/DVD, directed by David Kaufman)
- The Other Europeans
  - Splendor
  - The Broken Sound (Film/DVD, directed by Yvonne & Wolfgang Andrae
- The Semer Ensemble
  - Rescued Treasure
- Guy Klucevsek & Alan Bern
  - 'Accordance'
  - Notefalls
- With Itzhak Perlman, Brave Old World, Andy Statman Trio
  - In the Fiddler’s House
  - Live in the Fiddler’s House
  - In the Fiddler’s House (Film/DVD)
- Bern, Brody & Rodach
  - Triophilia
- The Klezmer Conservatory Band
  - Klez!
- Alpen Klezmer
  - Alpenklezmer
  - Zum Meer
- Voices of Ashkenaz
- The Kadya Choir
  - The Young Kadyas CD (2022)
  - Featured in Die jungen Kadyas Documentary Film (2022)

== Awards (selected) ==
- Order of Merit of the Federal Republic of Germany (2022)
- Thuringia Order of Merit (2017)
- Weimar Prize (2016)
- General Project Support, German Federal Cultural Foundation, for Yiddish Summer Weimar (2016)
- New States Funding, German Federal Cultural Foundation, for the Other Music Academy (2014–15)
- German Record Critic’s Prize for "Splendor," The Other Europeans (2012)
- German Record Critic’s Prize for "Sol Sajn," (2009)
- European Commission Award for Best Practices for the Roma Community (2009)
- TFF Rudolstadt Ruth Lifetime Achievement Award (2009)
- “Compass” Award for Best Practices, Jewish Music and Culture (2009)
- German Music Council, 1st Prize for Intercultural Music
- German Record Critic’s Prize for “Blood Oranges” Brave Old World (1998)

== Publications ==
- Think Fast: An Introduction to Present-Time Composition, in Researching Improvisation, 2016, Transcript Verlag
- Klezmer Duets for Clarinet and Accordion, with Christian Dawid, 2016, Universal Edition
- Klezmer Accordion for Intermediate Accordion, 2015, Universal Edition
- Liner notes to 12-CD collection Sol Sajn: Jewish Music in Germany 1953-2009, 2009, Bear Family
- Who is Weiskopf? Joshua Sobol’s Ghetto on East & West German Stages, 2003 Paul Lecture, Indiana University Press
- Representing Jewish Identity, 2001, La Rasegna Mensile, Spring
- From Klezmer to New Jewish Music, 1998, Mens en Melodie
- Remarks on “Ghetto” and "ghettos", 1993, Maxim Gorki Theater publication
