= Socalled =

Canadian rapper (born 1976)

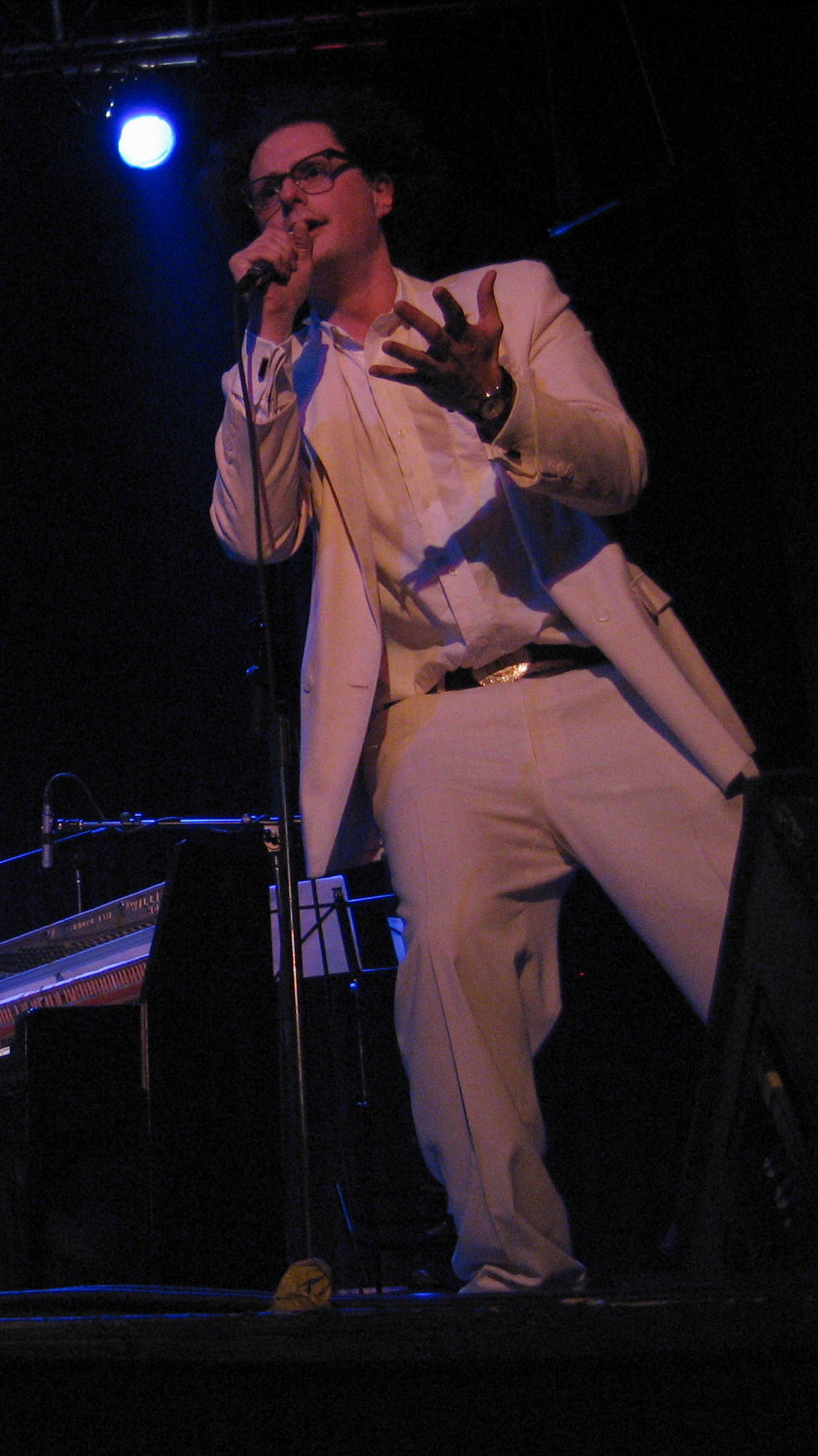
- Socalled performing in Montreal, October 2005

Background information
- Born: Joshua Dolgin; December 28, 1976 (age 49); Ottawa, Ontario, Canada
- Origin: Montreal, Quebec, Canada
- Genres: Jewish hip-hop, klezmer
- Occupations: Rapper, record producer
- Instruments: Piano, accordion
- Years active: 2003–present
- Labels: Piranha Musik, Label Bleu, Dare to Care Records
- Website: socalledmusic.com

Joshua Dolgin (born December 28, 1976), better known by his stage name Socalled, is a Canadian rapper and record producer known for his eclectic mix of hip-hop, klezmer, and other styles such as drum & bass and folk music. A pianist and accordion player, he has taught the latter at Klezfest London, where he has also run workshops in "hiphopkele". He has played with clarinetist David Krakauer's Klezmer Madness!, Michael Winograd and has also worked with artists such as rappers C-Rayz Walz, Chilly Gonzales, funk trombonist Fred Wesley, and Sophie Solomon. Dolgin has Ukrainian, Romanian and Russian roots.

== Life and career ==
In 2000 he composed music for the documentary film Man of Grease.

Dolgin's Socalled collective and guests celebrated the Jewish Festival of Lights with the seasonal concert "Hip Hop Hanukkah" in 2007. He is the subject of The "Socalled" Movie, a documentary released in 2010 by Garry Beitel for the National Film Board of Canada, which also features Krakauer and Wesley. The documentary includes footage of the first "Klezmer Cruise", in which a boatload of klezmer fans sailed down the Dnieper River in Ukraine.

In 2013, his remix of Moe Koffman's "Curried Soul" became the new theme music for CBC Radio One's As It Happens.

His 2011 recording "Work With What You Got" was co-written by and features vocals by calypso musician The Mighty Sparrow.

Recipient of the Adrienne Cooper Dreaming in Yiddish Award.

== Discography ==
=== Albums ===
- HiphopKhasene (with Solomon) (2003)
- Consensus: Live in Concert (with Beyond the Pale) (2005)
- The So Called Seder: A Hip Hop Haggadah (2005)
- Ghettoblaster (2007)
- SleepOver (2011)
- The Season (A musical presented during the Pop Montreal festival with Yves Lambert, Katie Moore, Rich Ly, Josh Goldman, Yassin "The Narcicyst" and Josh Dolgin) (2013)
- Peoplewatching (2015)
- Isaac Babel's Tales From Odessa: A Socalled Yiddish Musical (2017)
- Di Frosh (with Kaiser Quartett) (2018)
- The 2nd Season (2019)

=== Singles ===
- "(These Are The) Good Old Days" (2007)
- "You Are Never Alone" (2007)
- "(Rock The) Belz" (2007)

=== Self ===
- The Socalled Movie (2010)
