= Brave Old World =

International klezmer band

Brave Old World is an American and German klezmer band. It formed in 1989. Members hail from the US and Germany. The Washington Post called Brave Old World "the revival's first supergroup. Every player is a virtuoso.” In 1992, the group won first prize at the International Klezmer Festival in Safed, Israel. Clarinetist Joel Rubin was a founding member.

The final members were:

- Michael Alpert (vocals, accordion, guitar, violin, percussion)
- Alan Bern (musical director, piano, accordion)
- Kurt Bjorling (clarinet, bass clarinet, saxophone. accordion, tsimbl)
- Stuart Brotman (double bass, tsimbl, tilinca, percussion, trombone)
- Christian Dawid (associate clarinetist)

The group's albums include

- Klezmer Music (1990; Flying Fish Records)
- Beyond the Pale (1994; Rounder Records)
- Blood Oranges (1999; Red House)
- Bless the Fire (2003, Pinnorekk Musikverlag, Germany)
- Dus Gezang Fin Geto Lodzh / Song of the Lodz Ghetto (2005; Winter and Winter)
- Hoffman's Doina (2019, Laurel Records, with solo marimbist Alex Jacobowitz) was released as a single.

The group has also been featured on two albums by violinist Itzhak Perlman.

A DVD "Brave Old World--Live In Concert" (Sun-Street Inc., Toronto, Canada) was released in 2006.
