= Michael Alpert =

American klezmer musician and educator (born 1954)

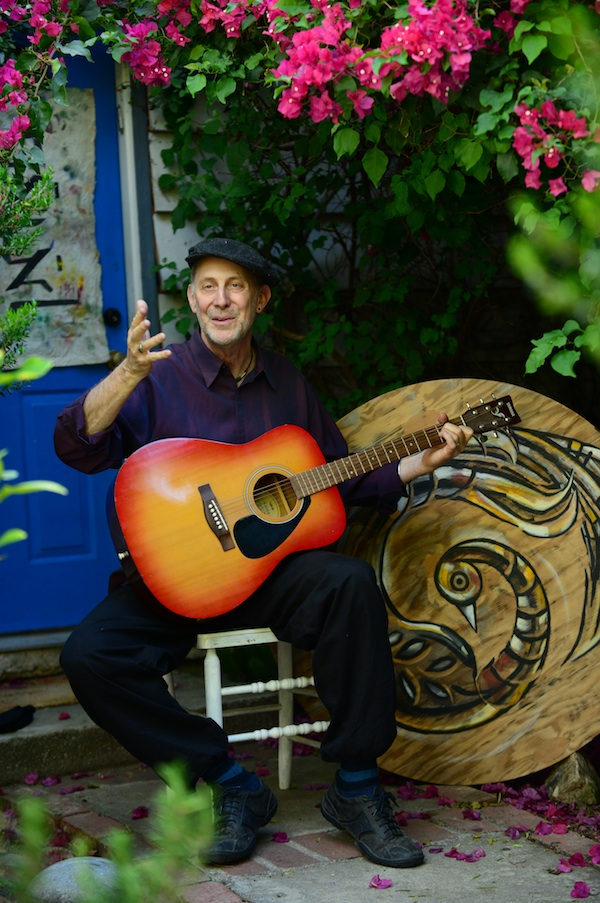
- Alpert in 2016

Background information
- Born: Michael Alpert; 1954 (age 70–71); Los Angeles, California, U.S.
- Genres: Klezmer
- Occupations: Musician, singer, scholar
- Instruments: Guitar, violin, accordion, percussion, vocals
- Years active: 1970s–present

Michael Alpert (born 1954, Los Angeles, California) is a klezmer musician and Yiddish singer, multi-instrumentalist and educator. Ethnomusicologist Mark Slobin referred to him as "a key figure in the modern klezmer revitalization". He is a recipient of the 2015 National Heritage Fellowship, awarded by the National Endowment for the Arts, a lifetime honor presented to master folk and traditional artists in the United States.

== Career ==
As a teenager in the early 1970s, Alpert lived in Yugoslavia, researching traditional music and dance and learning the languages of the western Balkans, particularly the former Serbo-Croatian and Macedonian.

Alpert has performed solo and in a number of ensembles since the 1970s, including Brave Old World, Kapelye, Khevrisa, The Brothers Nazaroff, Voices of Ashkenaz and The An-Sky Ensemble, and has collaborated with clarinetist David Krakauer, hip-hop artist Socalled, singer/songwriter/actor Daniel Kahn, bandurist Julian Kytasty, violinist Itzhak Perlman, ethnomusicologist and musician Walter Zev Feldman, trumpeter/composer Frank London and numerous others.

As former research associate at New York's YIVO Institute for Jewish Research, Alpert has worked on documentation of traditional Jewish music and Yiddish dance. He has also organized workshops on restoring Yiddish dance.

In addition to performance and teaching, Alpert has travelled throughout Eastern Europe, the Americas, Australia, Israel and Palestine conducting ethnographic research and documentation of Jewish and other traditional musicians and singers. His audio and video fieldwork archive of over 1,000 hours of interviews and field recordings was acquired by the American Folklife Center of the U.S. Library of Congress, and his scholarly publications include articles in:

- American Klezmer: Its Roots and Offshoots (University of California Press, 2002, ed. Mark Slobin) on Warsaw-born klezmer drummer Ben Bazyler (1922-1990),
- Jewish Instrumental Folk Music: The Collections and Writings of Moshe Beregovski (Moisei Beregovsky), translated and edited by Alpert, Mark Slobin and Robert Rothstein (Syracuse University Press, 2001)

Alpert can be credited with initiating the revival of rhythmic and harmonic sekund violin playing in klezmer music, a key technique and voice in traditional European klezmer ensembles that had fallen out of use prior to the klezmer revitalization. He was among the first figures of the klezmer and Yiddish culture revitalization to reintroduce, perform and teach the traditional solo a capella style of Yiddish folksong and folksinging worldwide.

Alpert was musical director of the 1995 PBS Great Performances special Itzhak Perlman: In the Fiddler's House (1996 Emmy Award for Outstanding Cultural Music-Dance Program and Golden Rose (Montreux) for same) and co-producer of the two Perlman klezmer CDs on the Angel Records/EMI label.

As of 2023, Alpert continues to teach and perform worldwide from his home in Scotland as a soloist and in various collaborations, including duos with Scottish fiddler Gica Loening and American fiddler Craig Judelman.

== Discography ==
- Night Songs from a Neighboring Village (2014) with Julian Kytasty (Oriente Musik)
- In Der Heym (2023) with Craig Judelman (Borscht Beat)
