= Daniel Kahn & the Painted Bird =

German klezmer band

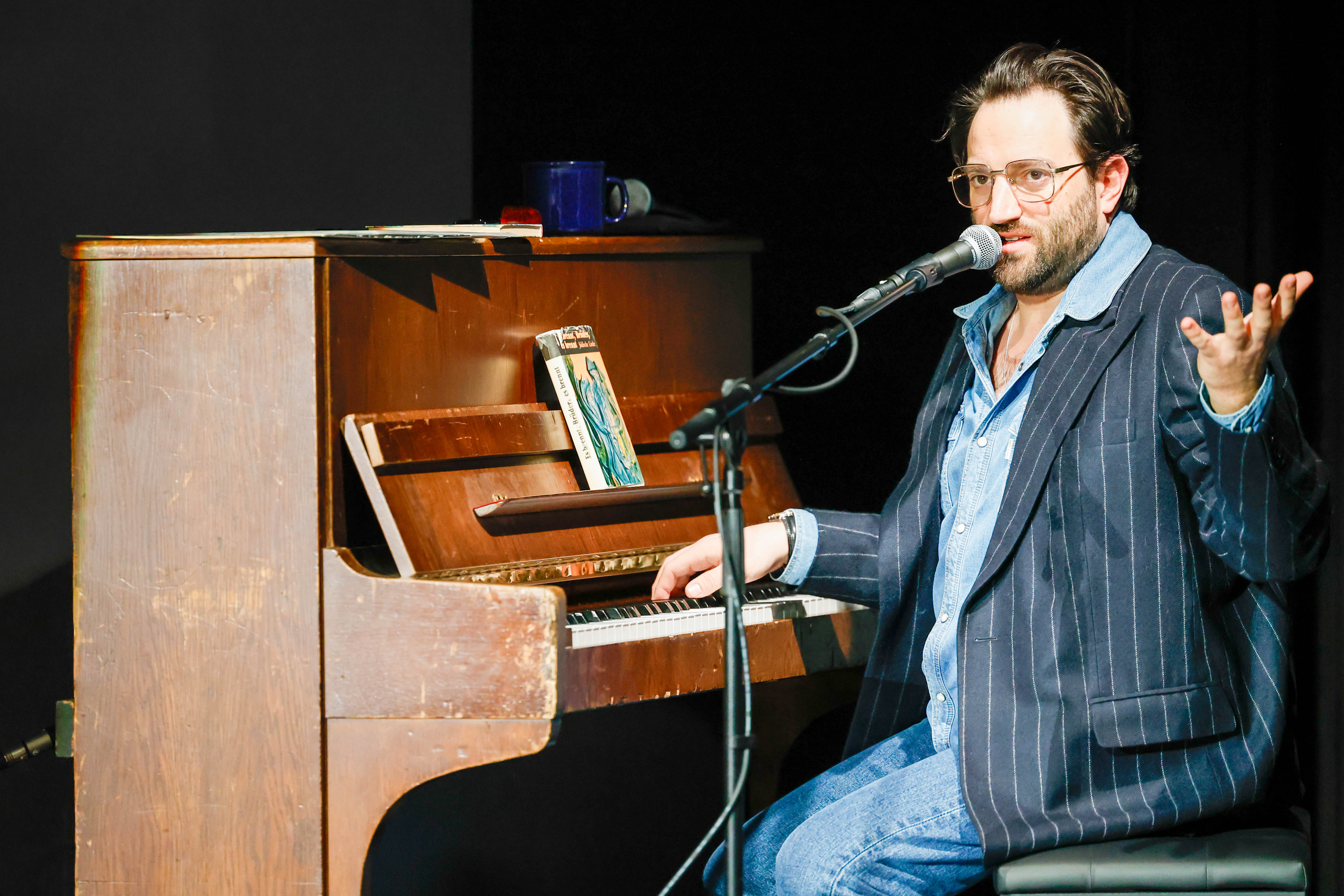
- Daniel Kahn in 2023

Background information
- Origin: Berlin, Germany
- Genres: Klezmer, punk rock, folk
- Years active: 2005–present
- Labels: Oriente Musik, Earthwork Music
- Members: Daniel Kahn; Hampus Melin; Michael Tuttle; Jake Shulman-Ment; Christian Dawid; Dan Blacksberg
- Past members: Michael Winograd; Johannes Paul Gräßer; Detlef Ebeneow; Bert Hildebrandt
- Website: www.paintedbird.de/index.php

Daniel Kahn & the Painted Bird is a German klezmer band founded by Jewish-American singer-songwriter and actor Daniel Kahn, originally from Detroit, Michigan. The band was formed in 2005 and is based in Berlin. They have released five albums through German world music label Oriente Musik.

== History ==
Daniel Kahn was born on September 11, 1978, in Detroit, Michigan. He studied theatre and writing at the University of Michigan. After graduating, Kahn moved to New Orleans where he worked as a bar pianist and was first introduced to modern Jewish music. The name of the band comes from the title of the novel The Painted Bird by Jerzy Kosiński.

== Musical style ==
Daniel Kahn coined the word "Verfremdungsklezmer", meaning "alienation klezmer", to describe their music, in reference to Bertolt Brecht's theory of Verfremdungseffekt. The group describes their music as "a mixture of Klezmer, radical Yiddish song, political cabaret and folk punk", and it has been compared to the music of Tom Waits and Woody Guthrie.

Many of the songs are written by Kahn, but some are adaptations of poems and songs by Jewish authors such as Mordechaj Gebirtig, frequently with socio-political themes. The Painted Bird have had songs about varied political topics, such as Nakam, a group of Holocaust survivors led by Abba Kovner who conspired to kill six million Germans in revenge for the Holocaust, and the government response to Hurricane Katrina, set to the tune of Dos Lid fun Titanik, a 1912 Yiddish song originally about the sinking of the Titanic. Kahn also sings songs by Franz Josef Degenhardt, David Edelstadt, and Mark Warshawsky. In 2016 he translated Leonard Cohen's "Hallelujah" into Yiddish, which garnered some attention on YouTube.

He sings in English, German, Russian and Yiddish, often mixing several languages in one song. Translating lyrics has been an interest and source of inspiration.

== Political activism and views ==
Daniel Kahn has stated that he is very politically engaged, including having concerns over women's rights, rights of refugees, rights of migrants, prisoners' rights, islamophobia, antisemitism, racism, authoritarianism, police brutality. He sees these issues as global, having lived in many different countries.

He is a fan of the author Rebecca Solnit.

His work has dealt the issue of memory around both the Nazi Regime, and of the DDR (especially Ostalgie and the Berlin Wall) in Germany. He believes the country's culture of remembrance is a positive thing (compared to a lack of such a culture in the USA, where "the atrocities of American history that are swept under the rug on a national scale"). He has stated that he would like "all the separation walls in the world" to become "lines of brick in the pavement... like the Berlin Wall".

He has been involved in events celebrating Bundist organisations, playing music for the anniversary of the Jewish Labour Bund in Melbourne, and for Bundists in Tel Aviv.

Kahn has said that he opposes the governments of Donald Trump, Viktor Orbán, Theresa May, and Benjamin Netanyahu, although he considers them "symptoms of the problem" rather than just problems in of themselves.

In 2023, he received the Adrienne Cooper Dreaming in Yiddish Award.

He is a supporter of the revitalisation of the Yiddish language.

== Discography ==
- Pegboard Blues (Unknown, 2002; re-released Earthwork Music, 2004)
- River Mouth (Earthwork Music, 2003)
- Uprooted Oak (Earthwork Music, 2005)
- The Broken Tongue (Chasma Records, 2006; re-released Oriente Musik, 2009)
- The Unternationale: The First Unternational (Auris Media, 2008)
- Partisans & Parasites (Oriente Musik, 2009)
- Lost Causes (Oriente Musik, 2010)
- Bad Old Songs (Oriente Musik, 2012)
- The Butcher's Share (Oriente Musik, 2017)
- Bulat Blues (Oriente Musik, 2019)
- The Unternationale: The Third Unternational (Oriente Musik, 2020)
- The Unternationale: The Fourth Unternational (Oriente Musik, 2020)
- Word Beggar (Oriente Musik, 2021)
- The Building and Other Songs (Oriente Musik, 2023)
- UMRU - unrest (Oriente Musik, 2025)
