= KlezKamp =

Klezmer music and Yiddish culture festival

KlezKamp was a yearly klezmer music and Yiddish culture festival in New York State.

Produced by ethnomusicologist and award-winning record and radio producer Henry Sapoznik from 1985 - 2015, the program created an innovative and intensive environment where senior practitioners of the Yiddish folk arts—klezmer music, Yiddish song, Yiddish language, literature and poetry, the culinary and visual arts passed on their life skills to newer generations.

First held every December at the Hudson Valley Resort, a hotel in New York's Catskill region, and later at the Ashokan Center in Olivebridge, NY (also in the Catskills), it attracted people from around the world to study with a veritable "who's who" of contemporary Yiddish life and culture.. A final year of the program was held in New York City.

Similar programs, such as KlezKanada, have emerged from it and have continued to grow.
