= Chaim-Meir Gegner =

Russian Jewish musician

Chaim-Meir Gegner or Gegna (Yiddish: חײם מאיר געגנער, c. 1860 – 1916) was a Russian Jewish violinist, klezmer bandleader and composer from Bila Tserkva. He was one of the celebrity Jewish violinist-composer-bandleaders of 19th century Ukraine, which included such figures as Pedotser, Stempenyu and Alter Chudnover. Several of his sons emigrated to the United States and become professional musicians, including the violinists Naum and Jacob Gegna and the cellist Max Gegna.

== Biography ==
Gegner was born in around 1860 in Bila Tserkva, Kiev Governorate, Russian Empire (now located in Kyiv Oblast, Ukraine). He was born into a family of Jewish klezmer musicians; his father was called Nachum Gegner (1820–1890) and his grandfather Moshko. Chaim-Meir had four sons who became professional musicians; the best known two were Jacob (Jascha), a violinist, and Max (Mischa), a cellist.

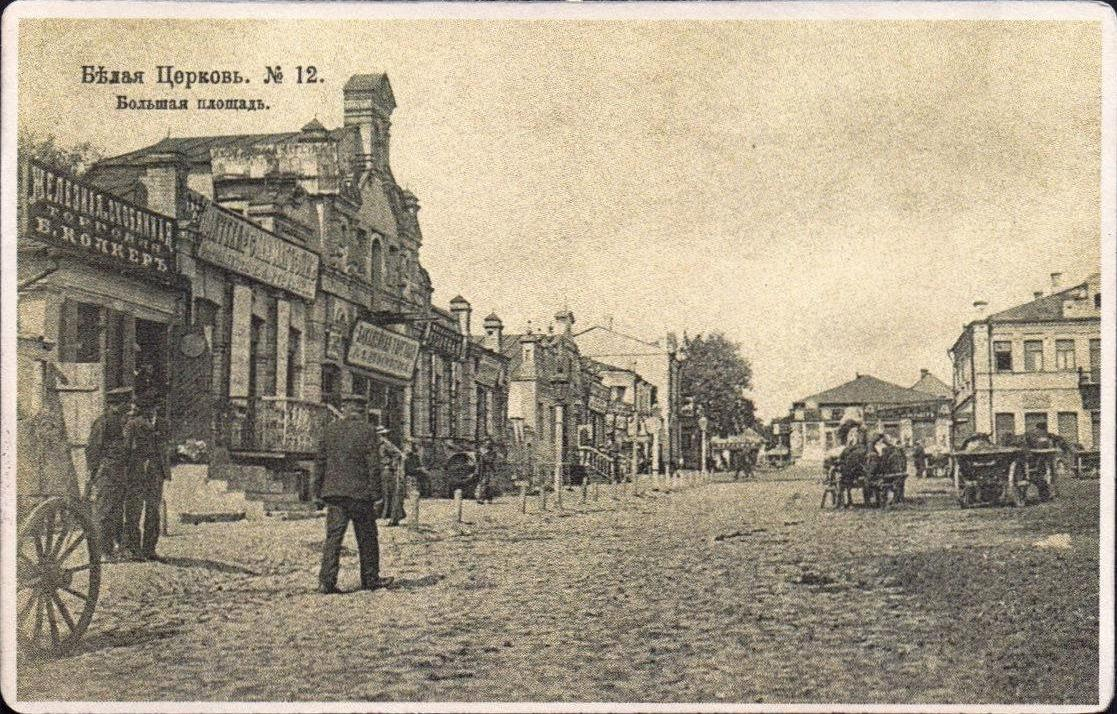
Jewish stores in Bila Tservka circa 1910

The ethnomusicologist Moisei Beregovsky, writing during the Soviet period, mentioned Gegner as one of the "Jewish professional musicians" who "became famous as exceptional performers, some even for their many compositions." One of the compositions in the manuscripts of Avraham-Yehoshua Makonovetsky, a major informant of Beregovsky, is credited to a Gegner and may be one of Chaim-Meir's. Chaim-Meir also seems to have crossed over into the classical world and been an orchestra leader and violinist.

Having raised his 4 sons as professional musicians, and having them sent all to study under some of the best teachers, he wanted them to form a family string quartet. However, the outbreak of the war canceled this plan; Max and Jacob emigrated to the United States in 1914. Chaim-Meir remained in Europe, and he died in Bila Tserkva on 3 November 1916. He was 56 years old.
