= List of Klezmer bands =

Klezmer (Yiddish: כלזמיר, from Hebrew: k'li zemer כלי זמר, lit. "vessels of song", meaning "musical instruments" in Hebrew; in Yiddish, "klezmer" refers to a professional Jewish instrumentalist) is a genre and type of music originating in Eastern Europe. It was originally played by Jews, but now, since a revival starting in the 1970s, it has become popular in the United States, among bands who have brought it back to Europe.

== Modern Klezmer bands ==
- Austin Klezmorim
- Beyond the Pale
- Amsterdam Klezmer Band
- Brave Old World
- Budowitz
- The Cracow Klezmer Band
- Daniel Kahn & the Painted Bird
- Di Naye Kapelye
- Dobranotch
- Ensemble DRAj
- Flying Bulgar Klezmer Band
- Giora Feidman
- Golem
- The Kabalas
- Kharkov Klezmer Band
- The Klezmatics
- Klezmer Conservatory Band
- Klezmofobia
- The Klezmorim
- Kleztory
- Kolsimcha - The World Quintet
- Kroke
- Kruzenshtern & Parohod
- Mames Babegenush
- Maxwell Street Klezmer Band
- Metropolitan Klezmer
- Moishe's Bagel
- New Klezmer Quintet
- Nu Haven Kapelye
- Veretski Pass
- Yale Strom & Hot Pstromi

== Historical Klezmer bands ==
- Belf's Romanian Orchestra
