= Beckerman =

Beckerman is a surname. Notable people with the surname include:

- Alyssa Beckerman (born 1981), American gymnast
- Bernard Beckerman (contemporary), American Shakespeare scholar and theater director
- Ilene Beckerman (born 1935), American writer
- Jon Beckerman (born 1969), American television producer, director, and writer
- Kyle Beckerman (born 1982), American soccer player
- Marty Beckerman (born 1983), American alternative journalist, humorist, and author
- Michael Beckerman(contemporary), American trade association President
- Sandra Beckerman (born 1983), Dutch archaeologist and politician
- Shloimke (Sam) Beckerman (1883–1974), American klezmer clarinetist
- Sidney Beckerman (musician) (1919–2007), American klezmer clarinetist

== See also ==
- Beckermann
