= Kholodenko =

Kholodenko or Holodenko (Russian: Холоденко) is a gender-neutral Slavic surname that may refer to

- Aron-Moyshe Kholodenko, (1828–1902) known by the stage name Pedotser, a violin virtuoso
- Boris Kholodenko, Russian biologist
- Vadym Kholodenko (born 1986), Ukrainian pianist
- Shifra Kholodenko (1909–1974), Soviet Jewish poet

== See also ==
- Cholodenko
