= Sidney Beckerman =

Sidney Beckerman may refer to:

- Sidney Beckerman (movie producer) (1920–2008), American film producer
- Sidney Beckerman (musician) (1919–2007), American clarinettist

== See also ==
- Beckerman (surname)
