= Pedotser =

Russian Klezmer musician (1828–1902)

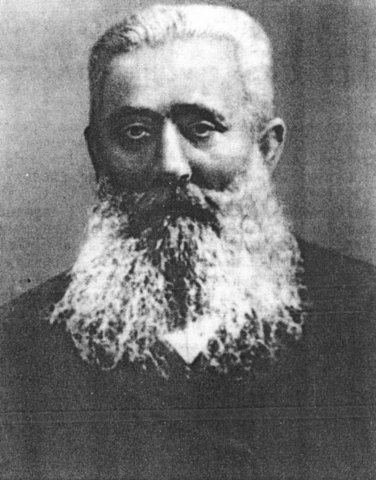
Pedotser (A.M. Kholodenko), klezmer violin virtuoso

Pedotser (Yiddish: פדהצור or פּעדאָצור, 1828–1902), pronounced Pedutser in most Yiddish dialects, was the popular name of Aron-Moyshe Kholodenko, a nineteenth century Klezmer violin virtuoso, composer and bandleader from Berdychiv, Russian Empire. He was one of a number of virtuosic klezmers of the nineteenth century, alongside Yosef Drucker "Stempenyu", Yehiel Goyzman "Alter Chudnover" and Josef Gusikov.

According to Moisei Beregovsky, Pedotser's ensemble was the best in Berdychiv and his compositions were among the most popular pieces at Jewish weddings in Ukraine in the late nineteenth century. The composition style of his virtuosic display pieces combined the techniques and aesthetics of nineteenth century Russian classical violinist such as Ivan Khandoshkin and of Jewish and Bessarabian folk violinists. Although he did not publish or record any music during his lifetime, a number of klezmer compositions and dances still being played in the twentieth century were attributed to him.

== Biography ==
Pedotser was born in 1828, probably in Berdychiv, Kiev Governorate, Russian Empire (today located in Zhytomyr Oblast, Ukraine). He was associated with the Kartshever Hasidim.

His klezmer ensemble gradually came to be the most popular in Berdychiv, and his compositions started spreading to other cities. He himself often introduced sophisticated variations into his compositions and tailored them to the mood of the crowd. He could also read music notation and had some familiarity with popular and classical repertoire. For example, he could play opera arias and pieces by Tchaikovsky, Vieuxtemps, Wieniawski, Waldteufel and Strauss, and knew how to adapt these pieces to be played by his orchestra. The normal size of his orchestra was twelve musicians, but it could be expanded to fifteen for rich weddings or eighteen for a ball.

At the height of his fame, he played not only for Jewish weddings, but for the Russian nobility and became a household name among both Jews and Christians in Ukraine. He is also said to have taught basic music notation to the chazzan and composer Zeidel Rovner in the 1870s.

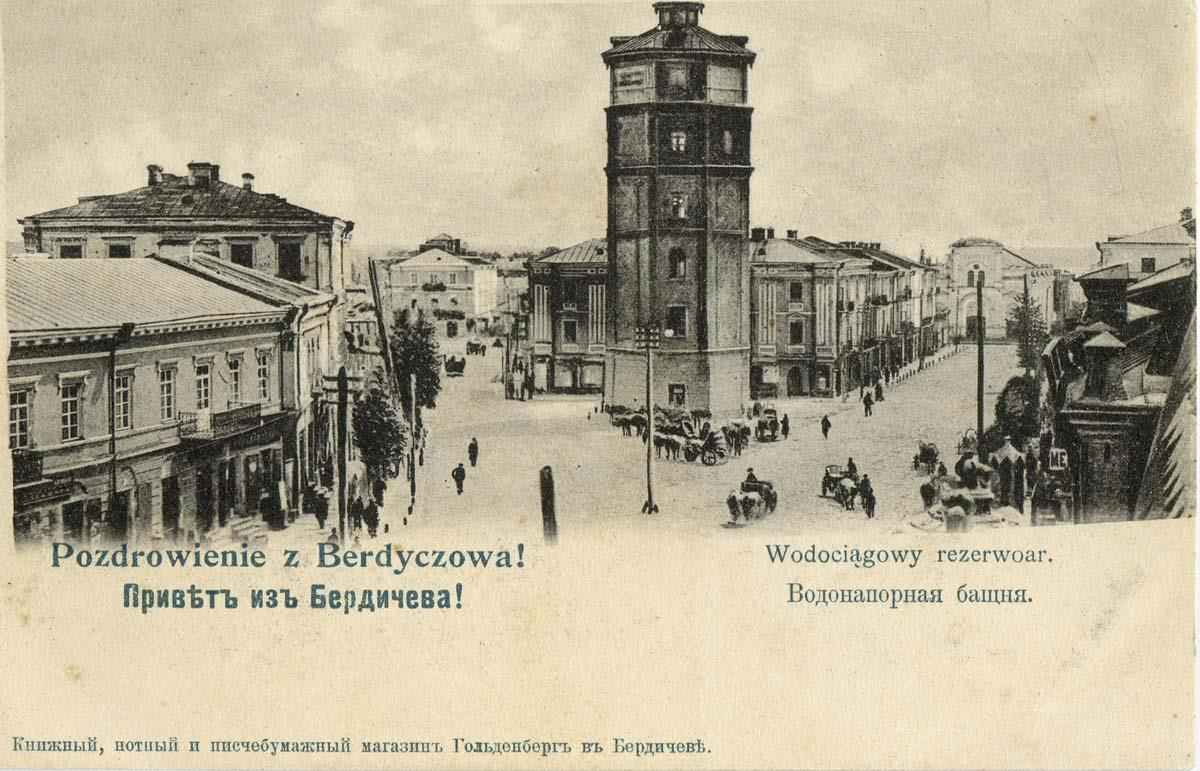
Berdychiv with Choral synagogue

He died in 1902 in Berdychiv. Among his well-known descendants were the Yiddish language poets Shifra Kholodenko and her brother David Hofstein.

== Legacy ==
After his death Pedotser's most famous compositions continued to circulate in Ukraine and were passed down in the repertoire of klezmer ensembles, or written down in manuscripts of bandleaders or musicians who learned them. Among these were the second violinist of his ensemble, Nathan Sapir; Motl Shteyngart of Bogopol, whose manuscript ended up in the collection of Susman Kiselgof; and Nokhum Noten of Bershad, whose manuscripts ended up in the hands of Soviet researcher of Jewish music Moisei Beregovsky. (Most of the Kiselgof and Beregovski collections are now held by the Vernadsky National Library of Ukraine.) Beregovski included some of these elaborate compositions in his klezmer collection, and noted that a large number of interesting klezmer violin pieces are linked to Pedotser, although he regretted that he had never seen any written down directly by the composer. Joachim Stutschewsky also included a virtuosic "lullaby" attributed to Pedotser in his 1959 book on klezmers.

His compositions also made it into early recordings of klezmer music, although they were rarely credited. One melody which is commonly ascribed to him was recorded by Belf's Romanian Orchestra in around 1910 as Tanets Rabina, by Harry Kandel's Orchestra in 1921 as Flaskadriga and by Art Shryer's Orchestra in 1929 as Dem Rebens Tanz. And the Zimro Ensemble, a modern sextet drawing on Jewish folk music sources which toured the world in 1918–21, played some of his pieces (a taxim and another called "Gahit") as part of their repertoire.
