= Kharkov Klezmer Band =

Ukrainian klezmer band

The Kharkov Klezmer Band (Russian: Харьков Клезмер Бенд), also known as the Kharkiv Klezmer Band (Ukrainian: Харків Клезмер Бенд), is a klezmer band from Kharkiv, Ukraine.

The band was founded in 1999, under the leadership of Stanislav Raiko (Станіслав Райко), and comprises a group of conservatory-educated musicians.

According to the "Cradle of Klezmer" website, dedicated exclusively to Klezmer music, it is one of the most successful klezmer bands not only in Ukraine, but also throughout the countries comprising the former Soviet Union. The ensemble won the Best Klezmer Music Band award at the First Regional Jewish Cultural Festival in Kharkiv in June 2000, and was named the Best Klezmer Band at the Jewish Cultural Festival in Kyiv, also in June of the same year. They were awarded the Best Klezmer Band award at the 4th All-Ukrainian Jewish Arts Festival "Shalom Ukraïna" in November 2000.

The band has performed in a number of national and international festivals, including the Klezfest 2000, in Saint Petersburg, Russia, where the violinist, Stanislav Raiko, won the Jury’s Special Prize for Mastery and the "Klezmer Es Irodalom" (Klezmer and Literature) Festival in Budapest in 2000, along with the renowned Hungarian klezmer bands Tikva and Odesa Klezmer Band, as well as at the KlezFest in Ukraine ("Клезфест в Україні") regularly since 2000, a Klezmer festival that takes place every year since 1999 in Kyiv, the capital of Ukraine. They are also regular guests at the Klezfest in London, starting with the 2001 edition, and have participated in other London events, such as the 2003 "Ex-Bloc Reunion. They participated as well in the Toronto Ashkenaz Festival in 2006, at the 5th Helsinki Klezmer Festival in 2007 with a concert and a klezmer master course, at the in 2008, the LvivKlezFest in July 2010, as well as many other festivals and concerts.

The Kharkiv Klezmer Band is known for its fine, classical technique and its "old-style" playing. In 2001, the ensemble was chosen to give the official welcoming concert for the Israeli President, Moshe Katzav, on his visit to Ukraine in 2001.

== Band members ==
In 2007, the band was essentially composed of the following four musicians:

- Stanislav Raiko (Станіслав Райко) - fiddle
- Gennadi Fomin (Геннадій Фомін) – clarinet
- Yuri Khainson or Heinson (Юрій Хаінсон) – accordion
- Artem Kolenchuk (Артем Коленчук) – double bass

whereas it has also included:

- Mykhailo Krupnikov (Михайло Крупніков) - voice
- Abbas Zulfuharov (Аббас Зульфугаров) - double bass

== Discography ==
- 2004: Ticking Again (Music & Words/Fréa Records)
- 2007: Radio-Chanson: Eight Stories about Jura Soyfer, a cabaret performance/play created by the Arabescs Theater-Studio (Театр-студію “Арабески”) of Kharkiv in honor of the Ukrainian-Austrian Jewish playwright and cabaret lyricist Jura Soyfer, published as a CD with booklet. Music by the Kharkiv Klezmer Band, lyrics by the Ukrainian poet Serhiy Zhadan.

== See also ==
- Klezmer
- List of Klezmer bands
