= Ensemble DRAj =

German Klezmer group

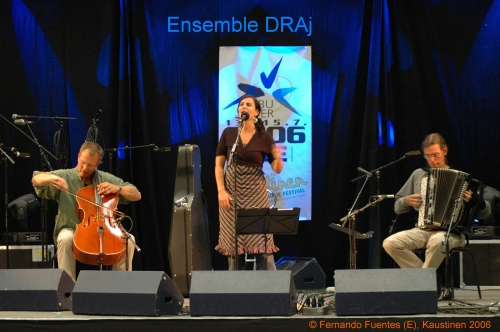
- Ensemble DRAj at the EBU-Festival 2006 Kaustinen (Finland)

Background information
- Origin: Germany
- Genres: Klezmer
- Years active: 2000–2004; 2006–present
- Labels: EthnoArt Essen (Germany) (2000); Laika-Records Bremen (Germany) (2006)
- Members: Manuela Weichenrieder (vocal) (since 2003); Ralf Kaupenjohann (accordion); Ludger Schmidt (violoncello)
- Past members: Anette Krüger (1996-2003)
- Website: www.draj.de

Ensemble DRAj is a German Klezmer group dedicated to arranging and presenting songs in Yiddish. The term “draj” is the Yiddish translation of the German word “drei” (i.e.: “three”).

== Genre and style ==
Ensemble DRAj focuses their work on the interpretation of Yiddish lyrics. But still, the style of their songs does not correspond to traditional Klezmer music. The musicians rather apply a special composition technique, very similar to the art of composing chamber music. Their main intention is to express their own individual feelings integrating their experience with classical music, modern music and jazz.

== History ==
Ensemble DRAj was founded in 1996 by Anette Krüger (vocals), Ralf Kaupenjohann (accordion), and Ludger Schmidt (violoncello). But it was not until a year later - after a period of arduous rehearsals that the group considered the songs to be mature enough to be presented to a public audience. The first program, “Lieder aus den Ghettos” (“Songs from the ghettoes”) was first performed in Essen (Kunstschacht Katernberg).

In 2000 the first CD Lieder aus den Ghettos was produced (EthnoArt/Essen). In 2001 Ensemble DRAj was invited to perform at the 1. Buenos Aires Klezmer Festival in Argentina. But due to the terrorist attacks on September 11 the concert was cancelled. A year later, the group was invited by the Goethe-Institut of Lisbon to play at the Festival Europa.

In 2003 singer Anette Krüger left Ensemble DRAj and Manuela Weichenrieder joined the group. Her first performance with the two instrumentalists took place in the same year at the 1. Klezmer Festival of Bremen. In 2005 German radio station WDR 3 broadcast a special feature about Ensemble DRAj. At the beginning of 2006 the second album Kinderjorn was published (Laika/Bremen). It was characterized as “CD of the week” by the magazine bluerhythm.

It was also WDR (Westdeutscher Rundfunk) that invited the group to perform at the EBU Folk Music Festival 2006 in Finland (Kaustinen) as the only German representative. Some time later Ensemble DRAj took part in the music contest Creole – 1. Preis für Weltmusik aus NRW (Creole – First Prize for World Music in NRW) and achieved the recognition as one of the best groups. In November 2006 the group started a new project in Essen together with Jürgen Wiersch, a well-known German lyric poet.

In 2007 WDR transmitted a live concert given in Dortmund in the famous domicil in Dortmund.

In 2008 Ensemble DRAj was invited to perform at the International Yewish Music Festival Amsterdam as the only German group.

== Discography ==
- Lieder aus den Ghettos (2000; EthnoArt)
- Carnival der Kulturen 1. Weltmusik - Made im Ruhrgebiet (2001; EthnoArt), Sampler
- Kinderjorn (2006; Laika)
- O bittre Zeit. Lagerlieder 1933-1945. (2006; Dokumentations- und Informationszentrum (DIZ) Emslandlager, Papenburg), Sampler
- nube de nanas para aspace (2010; producciones efímeras), Sampler
- Ale shvestern (2011; Laika)
