= Nu Haven Kapelye =

American klezmer ensemble

- Klezmer Ensemble
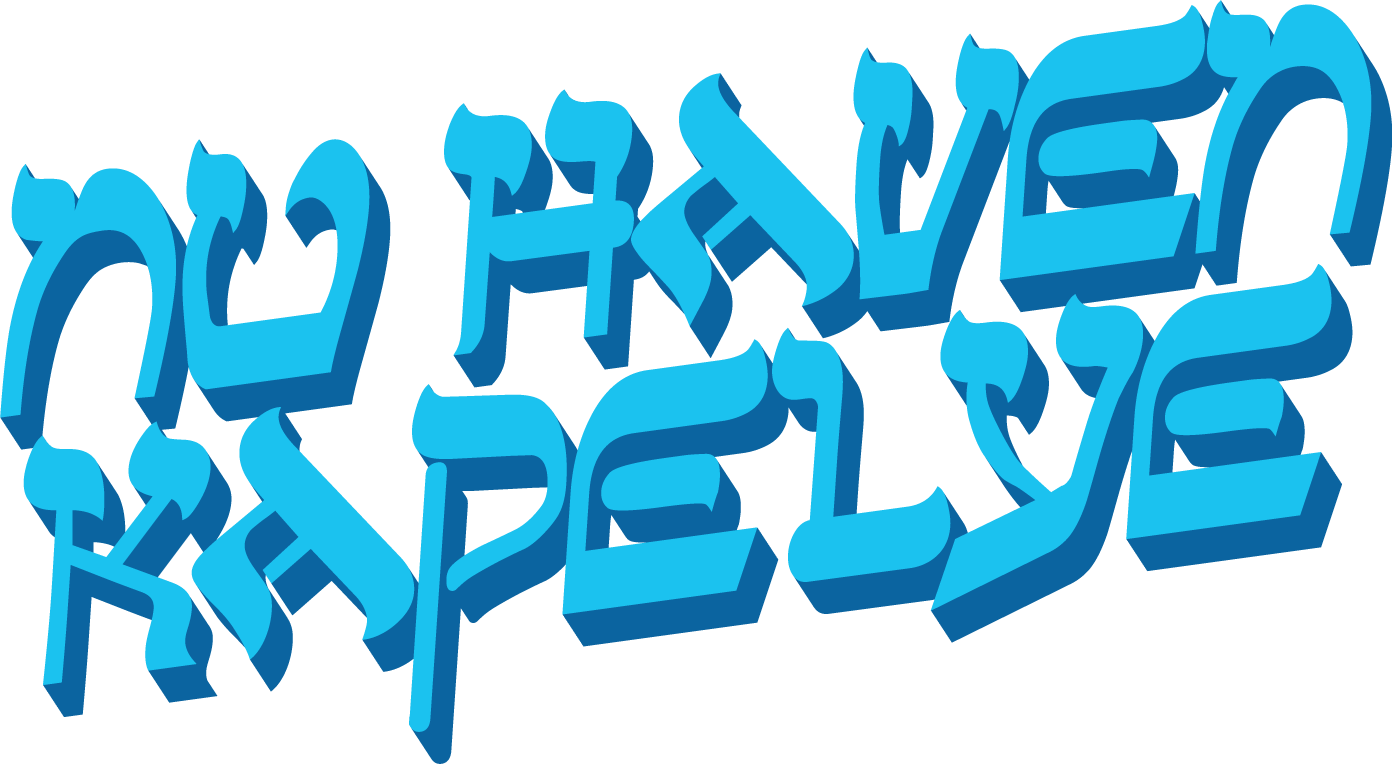
- Founded: 1998; 27 years ago
- Location: New Haven, Connecticut, U.S.
- Music director: David Chevan
- Website: www.nuhavenkapelye.com

The Nu Haven Kapelye is an American organization of musicians located in New Haven, Connecticut, that is dedicated to the performance and cultural preservation of klezmer.

== History ==
The ensemble was founded in 1998. Its first performance was that year, as part of Congregation Mishkan Israel’s annual December 25 concert. The group is led by bassist/arranger David Chevan. The string section was led by Grammy Award winner Stacy Phillips until his death in 2018.

The group is Southern New England’s largest klezmer ensemble. It incorporates traditional elements of klezmer from Eastern Europe, drawing as well on modern interpretations, big band, jazz, and rhythm and blues. The roster and number of players changes frequently.

A subset of the ensemble composed of professional musicians performs as the Nu Haven Kapelye All Stars.

In February 2019, the Nu Haven Kapelye obtained 501(c)(3) nonprofit status as an educational organization.

== Live shows ==
A tradition since 1998 has been the annual December 25 concert at Congregation Mishkan Israel in Hamden, Connecticut. In 2020 and 2021, the concert was broadcast online rather than in person, due to the COVID-19 pandemic.

The group plays throughout the greater New York/New England region, from clubs and music festivals to synagogues and assisted living facilities to weddings and other celebrations. It made its New York City debut December 22, 2016, at the Jalopy Theatre, a club in Brooklyn. In 2015 and 2019, the group played on the New Haven Green as part of the International Festival of Arts & Ideas. On December 31, 2021, the group performed in The Yiddish New York Klezathon: The World’s First-Ever 24-Hour Yiddish Concert. Other notable venues played by the New Haven Kapelye include the Katharine Hepburn Cultural Arts Center (The Kate), The State House, Connecticut’s Old State House, and Shoreline Jewish Festival.

== Mazel ==
In 2020, the Nu Haven Kapelye produced a music video for their remote recording of “Mazel”, featuring Frank London on trumpet. Mazel was an official selection of several film festivals. Among the honors, it was an official selection finalist in Beyond the Curve International Film Festival. It was awarded Best Music Video by the LA Sun Film Fest and Kansas Arthouse Film Festival, and Best Video by the Bubbe Awards.

== Discography ==
- What’s Nu? (2016)
- Nu Haven Style (2023)
