= Internet Association =

The Internet Association
- Formation: 2012; 14 years ago
- Dissolved: 2021
- Type: Trade association
- Location: Washington, D.C.
- Key people: Michael Beckerman; Founder and former President & CEO
- Website: internetassociation.org

The Internet Association (IA) was an American lobbying group based in Washington, D.C., which represented companies involved in the Internet. It was founded in 2012 by Michael Beckerman and served several companies, including Google, Amazon, eBay, and Facebook, and was most recently headed by president and CEO K. Dane Snowden before shutting down.

Prior to shuttering, IA lobbied Congress, the courts, foreign governments, federal and state agencies, and state and local governments on a range of regulatory issues. The group also published economic research on the internet economy.

Group members had included companies such as Airbnb, Dropbox, Etsy, Expedia, LinkedIn, Microsoft, Netflix and PayPal. Internet Association had offices in Washington, DC; Albany, New York; Chicago, Illinois; Seattle, Washington; Sacramento, California; and London, UK.

== History ==
On July 25, 2012, news outlets reported that several internet companies, including Google, Amazon, eBay and Facebook, were founding a new lobbying group. Michael Beckerman was appointed president and CEO of the new Internet Association, which was set to publicly launch in September of that year.

In December 2021, following financial difficulty and waning relevance after companies such as Microsoft and Uber pulled support, as well as key staff departures due to internal dysfunction, Politico reported that the organization planned to dissolve.

== Advocacy ==
The Internet Association was a lobbying group and shut down at the end of 2021.

=== Net neutrality ===
The association contested the FCC's initial net neutrality proposal in July 2014, advocating stronger neutrality rules. It later praised the newer rules that surfaced in early 2015, advocating for net neutrality rules to apply equally to wireless and wired internet connections, and applauded the development of net neutrality legislation by the Republican Party in the US Congress, which was developed as an alternative to the FCC reclassification proposal.

The association supported the 2015 Open Internet Order, lobbying for it in the press, Congress and the courts. It opposed FCC Chairman Ajit Pai's Restoring Internet Freedom Order.

It participated in the "Day of Action to Save the Internet" during the summer of 2017. It created a micro-site and video directing Americans to send comments to the FCC opposing the Restoring Internet Freedom Order, and stated plans to participate in lawsuits to overturn the Order as an intervenor.

=== Intellectual property ===
The association advocated patent reform legislation, to make it more difficult for patent trolls to sue for patent damages.

=== Privacy ===
In September 2018, Internet Association called for federal privacy legislation and released policy principles for a federal privacy law.

=== Sharing economy ===
In 2015, Internet Association president and CEO Michael Beckerman criticized the Seattle authorities for allowing vehicle for hire drivers to form unions, claiming that it would "undermine the ability of for-hire and ride-sharing companies to operate".

In 2017, the Internet Association opposed California AB 375, a data privacy bill that would require Internet service providers to obtain customers' permission to collect and sell their browsing history, citing desensitization and security as the basis for their opposition.

IA opposed Assemblywoman Lorena Gonzalez Fletcher's "tipping bill", arguing that the market, not the state, should dictate company decisions in the sector. The group similarly opposed an FCC vote on net neutrality in December 2017.

=== Trade ===
In 2015, the Internet Association submitted a public comment regarding the U.S. Department of Commerce's Bureau of Industry and Security (BIS)'s proposal to implement additional export controls regarding intrusion and surveillance software. The public comment was strongly opposed to the BIS proposal on several grounds: that the proposed rules lacked an intra-company exception; that the rules were broad, ambiguous, and burdensome; and that they would leading to a chilling effect on information sharing and limiting companies' ability to improve security. These concerns were shared by many cybersecurity researchers and individuals, small and large cybersecurity companies, coalitions and representation groups, and even other U.S. government organizations.

During negotiations over NAFTA in 2017, the IA supported a strong "safe harbor" protection, similar to the DMCA provision, for cases such as internet firms whose users post pirated content.

=== Intermediary liability ===
IA backed intermediary liability protections when opposing FOSTA and supporting Airbnb in its case against the city of San Francisco. IA also sponsored an advertising campaign in support of Airbnb in Chicago during the company's negotiations with the Emanuel administration regarding additional regulation and taxes.

=== Global internet governance ===
In 2016, IA led the coalition behind an amicus brief opposing an attempt to block the transition of internet domain oversight from the U.S. to an international governing body. The group then participated in the IANA transition which privatized the organization’s function at ICANN. The Hill listed it among the “Top 10 Lobbying Victories in 2016.”
