= Shifra Kholodenko =

Shifra Kholodenko (Russian: Шифра Наумовна Холоденко, Yiddish: שפרה כאלאדענקא; 1909–1974) was a Russian- and Yiddish-language poet, writer and translator from the Soviet Union.

== Biography ==
She was born in 1909 as Shifra Hofshteyn (Yiddish: שפרה האָפשטיין, Russian: Шифра Наумовна Гофштейн) in Bartkova Rudniya, Volhynian Governorate, Russian Empire (today Bartukha, Zhytomyr Oblast, Ukraine; Ukrainian: Бартуха). Her father, Nechemya Menakhem Hofshteyn, was in the timber trade. Her mother, Alte Chasya (née Kholodenko) was descended from A. M. Kholodenko, a famous Klezmer violin virtuoso, and it was that name that she would later use as her pen name. Her brother, Dovid Hofshteyn, also became a well-known Yiddish poet and literary figure later in life. Her primary education was received in Yasnohorod, Volhynian Governate. After that she received a degree in Mathematics from Moscow State University.

Her first poems were published in 1922 in the Yiddish-language literary magazine Shtrom, which was edited by her brother Dovid. Among the topics she developed in her poetry were themes about the natural world and biology, including Menstruation and its link to the cycles of nature.

For a time she was also a Yiddish-language teacher with Yaacov Reznik, a Yiddish-language pedagogue in Kyiv.

In 1940 she became a member of the Union of Soviet Writers. During the Nazi invasion of the Soviet Union in 1941, her mother, father and brothers (excepting Dovid) were killed at Babi Yar.

Vera Inber translated her poems into Russian.

In 1952 Dovid Hofshteyn was killed by Soviet authorities in the Night of the Murdered Poets. The death of her last brother was very difficult on her and greatly affected her work. She continued to live in Moscow in the 1960s.

She died in Moscow in July 1974.

== Selected works ==
- Lebn (1937)
- Lider (poems, 1940)
- Gants fri (short stories, 1940)
- Undzer kraft (1941)
- Blizkiy chelovek: Stikhi (1960)
- Dos vort (also known as Slovo) (1974)
