= Belf's Romanian Orchestra =

Russian Jewish music recording ensemble

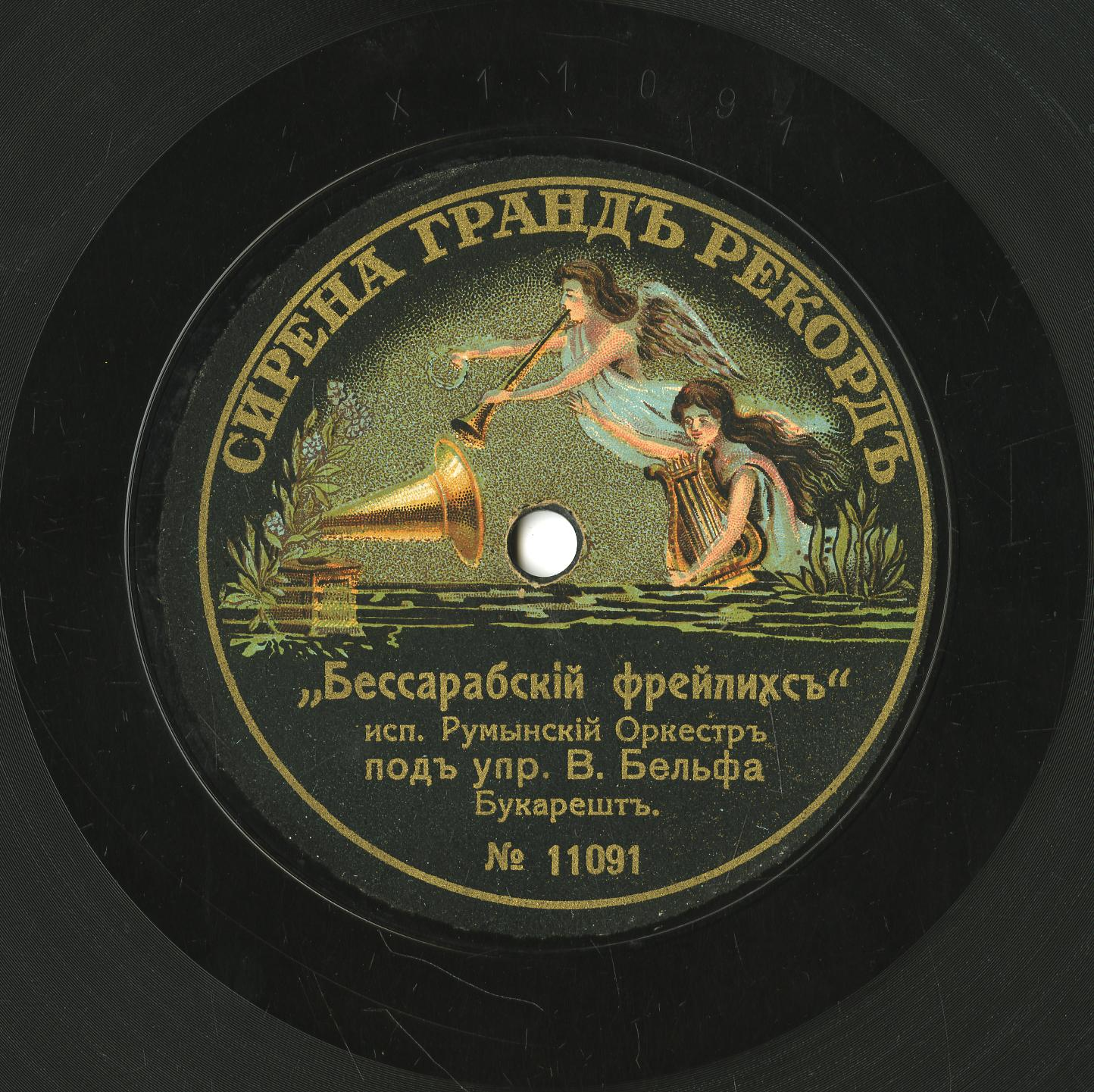
Cover of Belf's Romanian Orchestra disc, c.1912

Belf's Romanian Orchestra (Russian: Румынскiй оркестръ подъ упр. В. Бельфа, Romanian orchestra under the direction of V. Belʹf) was a Jewish music recording ensemble from the Russian Empire. Although little is known about them, their numerous recordings for Syrena Rekord during the period of 1911 to 1914 are among the earliest documented examples of recorded klezmer music and are played in a style very different from the better-known American klezmer recordings of the 1910s and 1920s.

== History ==
This small klezmer ensemble, which performed under the leadership of a bandleader known only as V. Belf, was recorded on 78-rpm discs for the Warsaw-based Syrena Rekord company starting in 1911. The recordings typically featured a clarinet playing the lead, a violin loosely following the melody, and a piano and second violin playing chords. Despite being labeled as a Romanian orchestra, with "Bucharest" often added to the disc labels and Romanian titles often given to sides (e.g. Chaban, Sirba, Zhok, Ruminskiy Motiv and Moldovanskaya Dudochka), their style was Jewish rather than Romanian, even when they played Romanian tunes. Belf’s repertoire consisted mainly of Jewish instrumental dance music, Hasidic music and some Yiddish theatre music played in a klezmer style. "Romanian" was apparently a euphemism for "Jewish"; most researchers agree that the ensemble probably came from Southwestern Ukraine, possibly from Podolia. As well, a number of their disc titles refer to places in Southwestern Ukraine, such as Lipovetskaya (Липоветская), Svirskaya (Свирская), and Khotinskaya (Хотинская) which are named after Lypovets, Skvyra, and Khotyn.

The period of recordings by this group began when the director of Sirena, Philip Lazarevich Tempel, was expanding the company aggressively in 1911 and attempting to enter "ethnic" markets. In that year he hired Belf and his ensemble to record what were apparently the label's first klezmer (instrumental Jewish) recordings. The records were marketed with titles that alluded to Hasidic rabbis, wedding rituals, or klezmer dance genres. Despite the fact that Belf was not a celebrity klezmer like Pedutser or Stempenyu, the records were extremely successful, and the company claimed that thousands of discs were shipped south to markets in Ukraine and Bessarabia. Hence Tempel continued to have Belf record more discs, eventually totaling around 30 or 40; Belf also recorded for other labels such as Amour Gramophone (Pishushchii Amur) and Extraphone in 1914. In addition, their popularity inspired another ensemble to record "Belf-style" recordings for Stella Grand Records during the same time period, although the identity of this group (or groups) is unknown. Sirena's boom in production was cut short by the start of World War I in August 1914; the owners of the record label were imprisoned in Germany during the war, and after their release they never reached their prewar level of success. It is not clear what happened to the Belf ensemble during or after the war, but they do not seem to have recorded again.

== Legacy ==
Because the Belf recordings were mass-produced and sold widely, copies were still circulating by the 1970s and attracted the interest of Klezmer revivalists. The tracks began to appear on reissue albums, including Klezmer music (1910-1927): early Yiddish instrumental music (Folklyric, 1983), Klezmer pioneers: European and American recordings, 1905-1952 (Rounder Records, 1993), Yikhes (Lineage): early klezmer recordings, 1911-1939, from the collection of Prof. Martin Schwartz (Trikont, 1995), Klezmer music: early Yiddish instrumental music, 1908-1927 (Arhoolie, 1997), Warsaw's Jewish mermaid: Syrena recordings from the Orvomaa archive 1909-1933 (Renair Records, 2018), and a number of others. The richly ornamented style of the recordings and the interplay of the instruments in a smaller ensemble have influenced revival groups in recent decades. Currently the largest collection of Belf recordings is available in the Mayrent Collection of Yiddish Recordings at UW-Madison.
