= Alter Chudnover =

Russian empire violinist

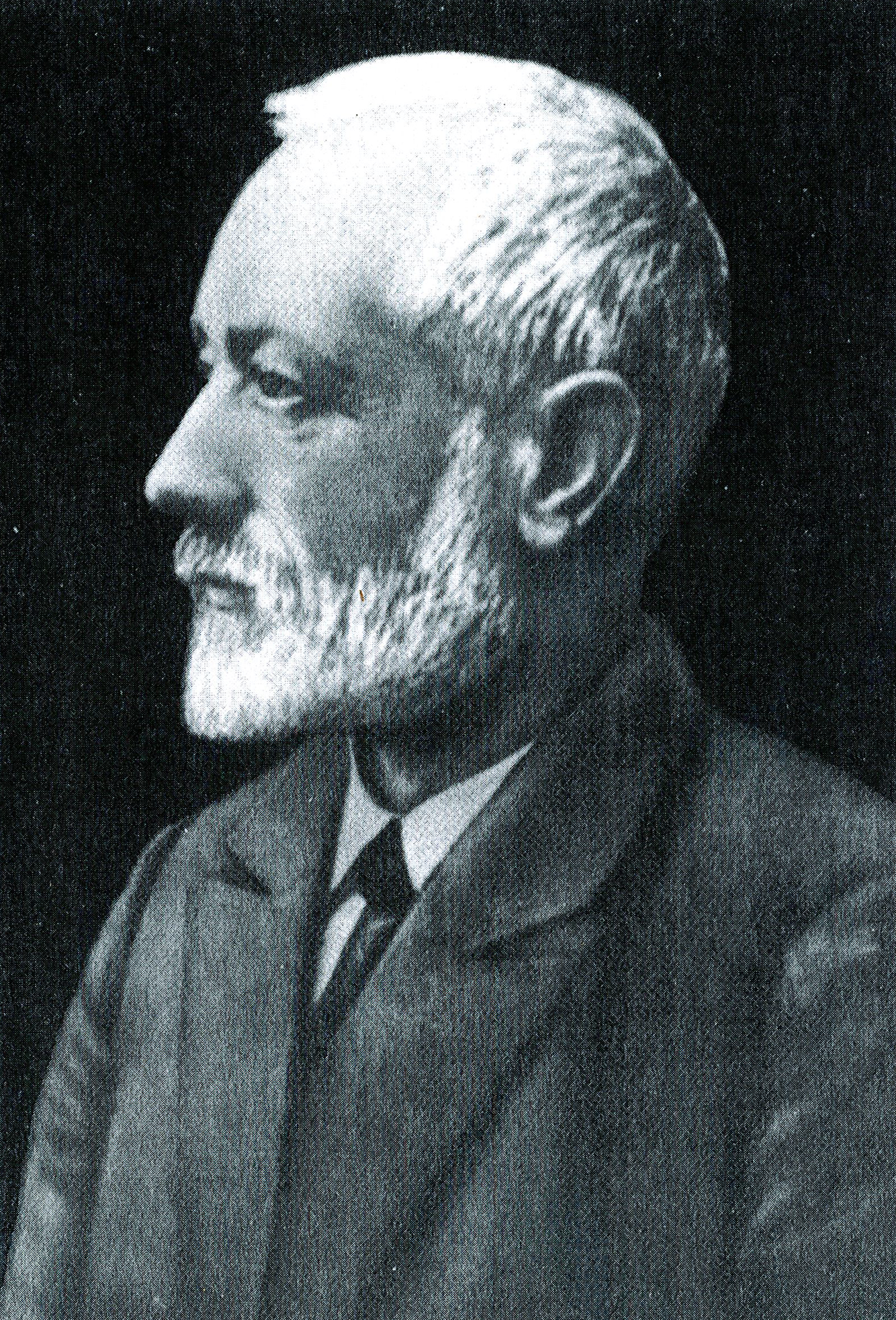
Yehiel Goyzman, also known as Alter Chudnover

Alter Chudnover (Yiddish: אלטער טשודנאָװער, c. 1846–1913), whose real name was Yehiel Goyzman or Hausman (יהיאל גױזמאַן or הױזמאַן), was a nineteenth century Klezmer violinist from the Russian Empire. He was one of a number of virtuosic klezmers of the nineteenth century, alongside Yosef Drucker "Stempenyu", A. M. Kholodenko "Pedotser" and Josef Gusikov. He was also an early teacher to the violinist Mischa Elman.

== Biography ==
Yehiel Goyzman was born in Chudniv, Volhynian Governorate, Russian Empire (now in Zhitomir Oblast, Ukraine) in the 1840s; some sources give the year as 1846, and others as 1849. He was born into a Klezmer family; his father Leyb Goyzman was also a violinist. Yehiel showed musical talent at an early age and was apparently sent to Warsaw to study violin; when he returned to Chudniv he joined his father's orchestra.

Yehiel soon became famous as a lead violinist and teacher, and gained a reputation as a very modern instructor who required his students to be able to read sheet music and to learn modern musical technique. He also became popular among Russian aristocrats, as was his contemporary Pedotser; and would travel to distant parts of the Russian Empire, Romania and Austria-Hungary to perform at weddings or other events. There was also a competing klezmer ensemble in Chudniv led by Baruch Beckerman, father of the American klezmer Shloimke Beckerman.

He tried emigrating to the United States in around 1902, accepting the invitation of his brother who had been there since 1888. But he soon returned to Europe when he found his status was much lower in America.

Although some sources say he died in 1912, it seems he actually died on 27 March, 1913.

== Legacy ==
Some of Alter Chudnover's sons, who were also professional musicians, met with Soviet ethnomusicologist Moisei Beregovsky in Kyiv in 1934. They donated some manuscripts of his compositions to Beregovsky, which ended up in the collection of the Vernadsky National Library of Ukraine. Other manuscripts apparently survived in Chudniv in Goyzman's former house until they were destroyed during World War II. Beregovski included one extended composition by Alter Chudnover in his Jewish Instrumental Folk Music volume.
