= Klezmofobia =

Danish klezmer band

Klezmofobia is a klezmerband from Denmark with Bjarke Kolerus on clarinet, Ole Reimer on trumpet, Andreas Ugorskij on guitar, Jesper Lund on bass balalaika, Jonatan Aisen on drums and Channe Nussbaum as lead singer. The band was established in 2004 and has released three albums: Tantz! (2006), Ganze Welt (2008) and Kartushnik (2012). Klezmofobia was given the award Årets Danske World Album 2007 (2007 Danish World Album) for their first album at Danish World Awards 2006.
