= Jacob Gegna =

Jacob Gegna יעקב געגנער
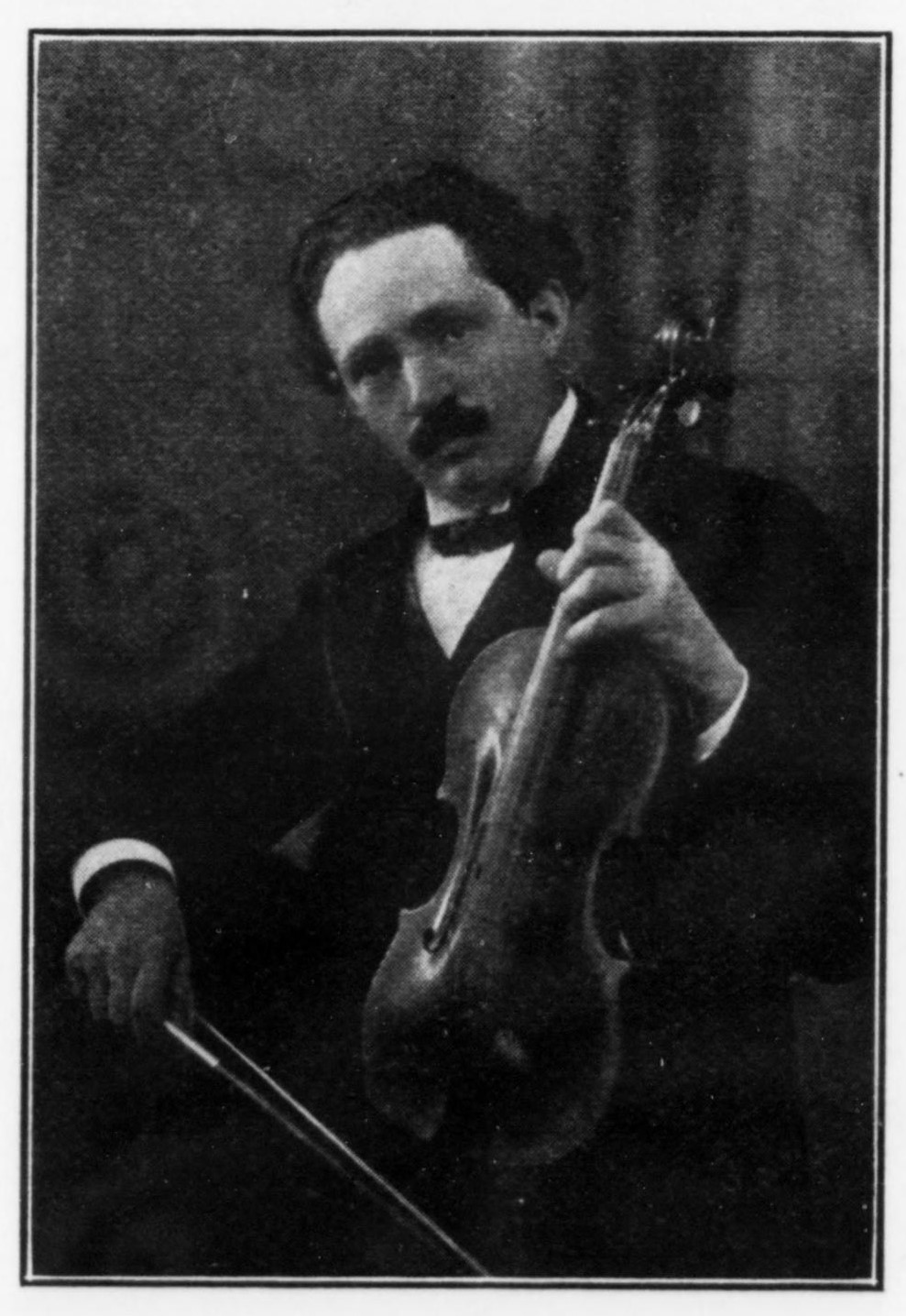

Background information
- Also known as: Jascha
- Born: December 17, 1879 probably Poltava, Russian Empire
- Died: September 11, 1944 (aged 64) Los Angeles, California, U.S.
- Genres: Klezmer, classical
- Occupations: Orchestral violinist; violin teacher; recording artist; composer
- Instrument: Violin
- Years active: 1899–1942
- Labels: Amour, Extraphon, Columbia
- Spouse(s): Slava Gegna, Blanche Brazinsky

Jacob M. "Jascha" Gegna or Gegner (Yiddish: יעקב געגנער, 1879–1944) was an American violinist, teacher, composer and recording artist. Today he is mainly remembered for his work as a teacher in New York and Los Angeles, as well as his early twentieth century 78 rpm recordings of solo klezmer violin music which are among the only of their type to have been preserved. Gegna is also one of the few historical klezmer musicians to have recorded both in Europe and in the United States.

== Biography ==
Jacob Gegna was probably born in Poltava, Poltava Governorate, Russian Empire (today in Poltava Oblast, Ukraine) on 17 December 1879. Some sources give his birth year as 1883 or Kyiv or Bila Tserkva as a possible birthplaces. He came from a hereditary klezmer musician family; his father Chaim Meyer Gegner was a violinist and composer from Bila Tserkva who the ethnomusicologist Moisei Beregovsky listed among the great klezmer violinists of the 19th century. His mother was called Anna Pikaskaya. Jacob's father was his first teacher, and he later claimed to have started his music career in 1899. At that time, the Russian Empire classical music world was opening up to Jewish musicians and Meyer sent his sons to study under professionals with the intention of having them form a quartet in Leipzig; Jacob studied under Kolokovsky at the Kiev Conservatory. He also claimed to have studied with Leopold Auer in Saint Petersburg in 1903-4, although it hasn't been proven independently. It was at around this time that Jacob married his wife Slava. Apparently at Auer's recommendation, he was appointed head violin teacher at the Poltava school of music by around 1910, and became a soloist in the Poltava symphony.

It was in this era, in around 1913, that Jacob made about twelve 78 rpm recordings for the Amour and Extraphon labels, including a handful of solo klezmer pieces, which were mostly recorded in Poltava. The last place Jacob lived in Europe was in Kyiv; in 1913, while living there, he attended the trial of Menahem Mendel Beilis. Beilis' testimony during the trial made an impression on Jacob, who would later compose a violin piece in his honor. Jacob and his brother Max (Mischa) fled Russia at the outbreak of the First World War and emigrated to the United States, sailing from Antwerp and arriving in New York City in June 1914. Their father died in Bila Tserkva in 1917.

By the fall of 1914, Jacob was already being noticed in New York. A Forverts article about him from November was headlined "A great artist in New York." In those early years the brothers performed as a trio with a pianist, Weber. Jacob played recitals on small stages in New York, but it was Max who soon became well known as a concert cellist. Meanwhile, Jacob became better known as a violin teacher than as a performer and opened a studio on the Upper East Side. Another early appearance of the brothers was in the ensemble accompanying Joseph Rosenblatt at a benefit concert in 1915. Jacob also toured as a soloist with Modest Altschuler's Russian Symphony Orchestra in 1917. Partly on the strength of that tour, he had his debut in New York at the Aeolian Hall in March 1918. In 1920 he made a test recording of a Taxim for Victor Records, but it was never released; the following year he recorded it at Columbia Records alongside another solo klezmer violin piece, his elegy for Menahem Mendel Beilis.

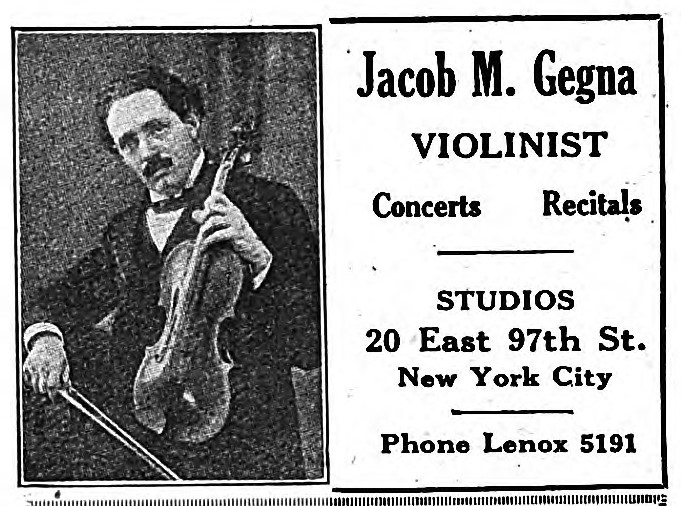
Advertisement for Gegna from 1918

Gegna had plenty of students in this era who were considered to be interesting or promising violinists. He toured with one of these in 1920, a seven-year-old child prodigy named Sammy Kramar. In September 1924 he was honored by a 25th anniversary concert at Carnegie Hall; this featured his daughter Jenny (a soprano) and a number of his students, including Max Melti, Gabriel Engel, Helen de Witt Jacobs, Issay Lukashevsky, Olcott Vail and Benjamin Steinberg. He opened a new studio in Far Rockaway, Queens. In 1924 he also performed a concert of his own compositions at the Aeolian Hall alongside Thomas Vincent Cator. Gegna also edited published version of some of Cator's compositions. He continued to play occasional solo concerts, including a high-profile one at the Aeolian Hall in April 1927. In 1928 he remarried, this time to Blanche Brazinsky.

In 1929 he visited the west coast and made his Los Angeles debut at Hazard's Pavilion. After that he played a benefit concert for displaced Russian Jews; the event was headlined by Joseph Cherniavsky, who had recently arrived in the city and was presenting his "Chassidic Jazz Band" vaudeville act. Gegna followed in a trio performing arrangements of the Zimro Ensemble, Cherniavsky's old art music group. He decided to settle in Los Angeles; he opened a teaching studio in Hollywood and played in the Los Angeles Philharmonic. In 1932 he was appointed head of the violin department at the Institute of Musical Education; the string orchestra he founded there debuted in 1933. In 1935 Jacob and Max's brother Naum, who had been living in Germany, emigrated to the United States and joined them in California.

In 1942, while still living in Los Angeles, Jacob contracted tuberculosis. He spent his final two years living at the Duarte Sanitorium. He died on September 11, 1944 and was buried in the Beth Olam Cemetery of Hollywood.

== Legacy ==
One of Gegna's legacies are his students, some of whom went on to distinguished careers as musicians or conductors. His klezmer recordings also gained new interest during the Klezmer revival of the 1970s. The Klezmorim recorded his Taxim on their 1973 album Streets of Gold. The original 78 disc of Taxim was also remastered and released on the 1999 reissue cd Oytsres: Klezmer music 1908-1996. A handful more of Gegna's European recordings were reissued in 2015 on the CD "Chekhov's Band."
