= Thomas Vincent Cator =

American composer (1888–1931)

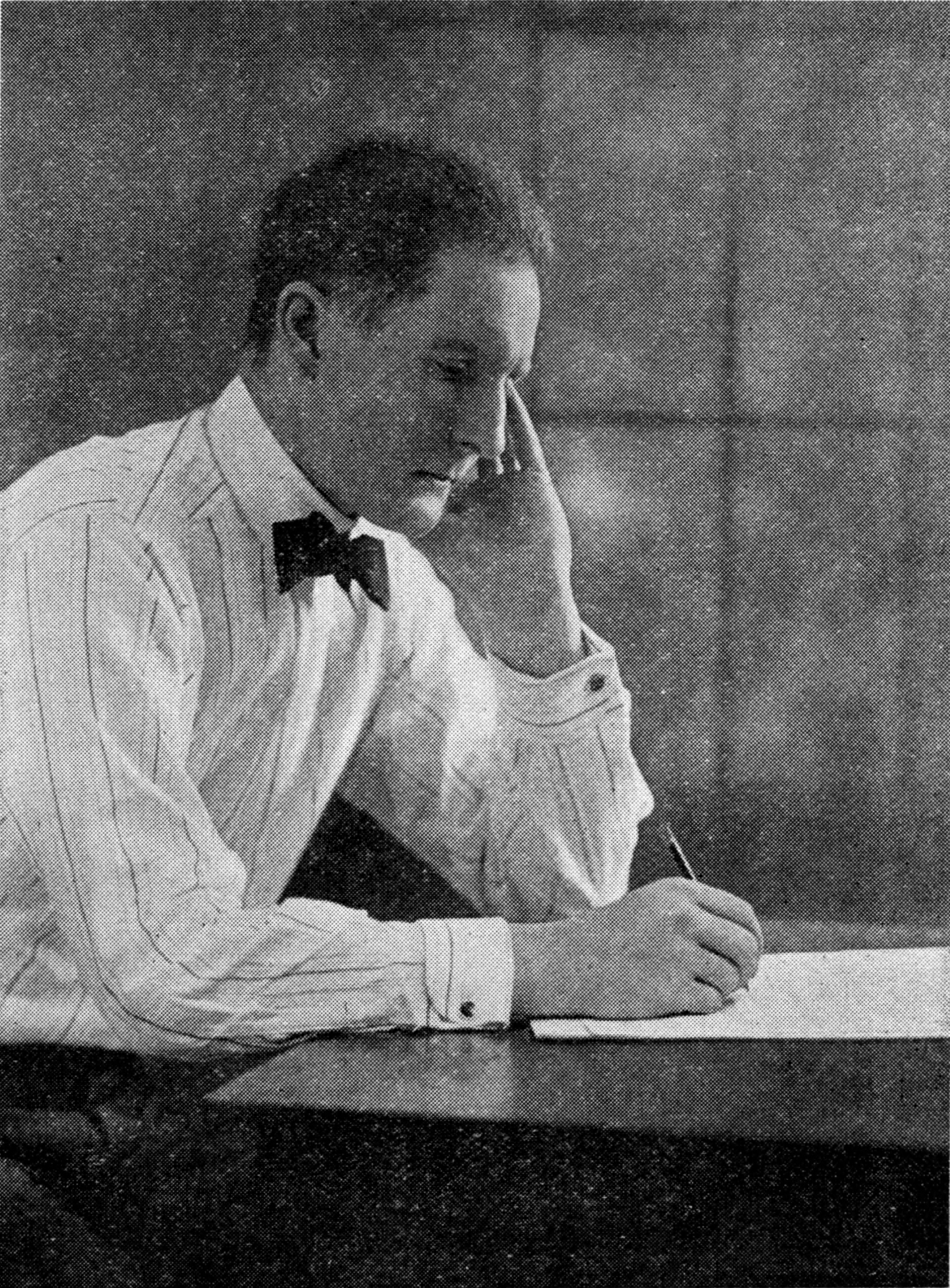
- Thomas Vincent Cator
- Born: March 23, 1888; Jersey City, New Jersey, US
- Died: April 9, 1931 (aged 43); Carmel-by-the-Sea, California, US
- Occupation: Composer
- Spouse: Irene V. Campbell
- Children: 4

Thomas Vincent Cator (23 March 1888 – 9 April 1931) was an American composer. His most significant achievement was the discovery and use of what he called the aura-modal scale.

== Biography ==
Thomas Vincent Cator was born in Jersey City, New Jersey on March 23, 1888. He was the son of Thomas Vincent Cator Sr. (1851-1920), a lawyer and politician who ran for office for the Populist Party in California in the late 19th century. He had a sister Marie (1883-1968), who became a writer and poet and first married Max Wardall (from 1902 to 1912) and later the famous figure skating couch Gustave Lussi (from 1921 to around 1930).

Cator became popular in the late 1910s and 1920s with his songs. A notable story was when renowned singer Eleonora de Cisneros sang his song "The Kiss" in a Liberty Bonds sale in New York City in early 1919 and received 43 million dollars for 43 kisses to bankers. He also invented the Aura-Modal Scale, in which he composed several piano pieces.

In 1922, Cator wrote the composition operetta for the play Inchling, written by Ira Mallory Remsen, that was a story of an inch worm and its struggle for wings, which captured the fantasies of young children.

The music of theatre, church, children, radio and phonograph has been made lovelier by his compositions. Had made voices in Carmel and has been one. The newest musical scale in existence is his creation: Aura-Modality.

— Carmel Pine Cone

== Death ==
Cator died of a heart attack on April 9, 1931, in Carmel-by-the-Sea, California at the age of 45.

== Compositions ==
- The Kiss, for voice and piano
- To Ramona, for voice and piano
- The pool of quietness, for voice and piano
- St. Moritz, for voice and piano
- One Day, for voice and piano
- Zamboanga, for voice and piano
- Clorinda sings, for voice and piano
- Three melodies for violin and piano (arranged by Jacob Gegna)
- Operetta Inchling (text by Ira Mallory Remsen)
- Violin sonata (1929)
