= Systems Biology Ireland =

Irish research centre

Systems Biology Ireland (SBI) is a Science Foundation Ireland-funded centre for science, engineering and technology research. It is an initiative between University College Dublin (UCD) and University of Galway (UCG). It is based on the Belfield campus of UCD, and works in the areas of systems biology, systems medicine and personalised medicine.

SBI designs new therapeutic approaches to cancer, its research enabling the development of technologies that can be used for early identification of responsive patient groups and accelerated discovery of new combination therapies.

People associated with SBI include its director Prof. Walter Kolch and deputy director Prof. Boris Kholodenko
