= Boris Kholodenko =

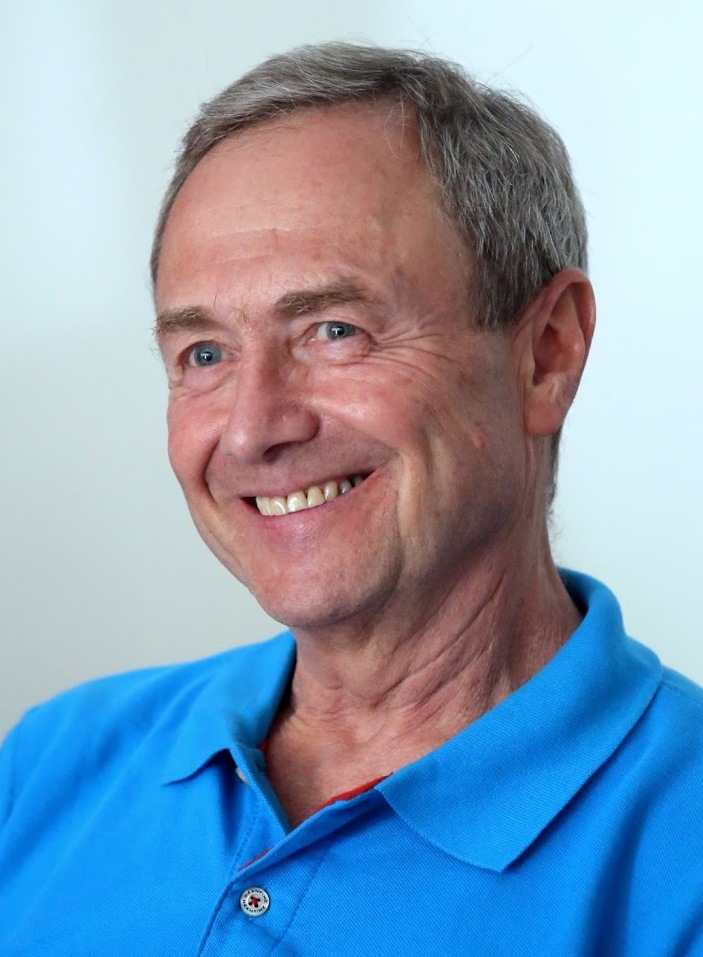
Boris Kholodenko, 2014

Boris N. Kholodenko is a Russian professor of Systems Biology at Systems Biology Ireland and Conway Institutes at University College Dublin, Ireland. He is also an adjunct professor at Thomas Jefferson University, Philadelphia where his group was behind the development of the first model of Epidermal growth factor receptor.

== Biography ==
Boris Kholodenko graduated from Institute of Physics and Technology from Moscow, Russia where he got his Ph.D. He used to be a professor and director of Computational Cell Biology at Thomas Jefferson University in Philadelphia.

In 2018 he was admitted as a member of the Royal Irish Academy.
