= Dovid Hofshteyn =

Yiddish poet

- Born: June 12, 1889; Korostyshiv, Kiev Governorate, Russian Empire
- Died: August 12, 1952 (aged 63); Lubyanka Prison, Moscow, Russia
- Occupation: Poet
- Writing career
- Language: Yiddish
- Literary movement: modernism

Dovid Hofshteyn (Yiddish: דוד האָפשטיין Dovid Hofshteyn, Russian: Дави́д Нау́мович Гофште́йн; June 12, 1889 in Korostyshiv – August 12, 1952), also transliterated as David Hofstein, was a Yiddish poet. He was one of the 13 Jewish intellectuals executed on the Night of the Murdered Poets.

== Biography ==
He was born in Korostyshiv, near Kyiv, and received a traditional Jewish education; his application to the Kiev University was declined. Hofshteyn began to write in Yiddish, Hebrew, Russian, and Ukrainian. His sister Shifra Kholodenko also became a poet.

After the October Revolution, which he welcomed, Hofshteyn wrote only in Yiddish. He was coeditor of the Moscow Yiddish monthly Shtrom, the last organ of free Jewish expression in the Soviet Union. The poems in which he acclaimed the communist regime established him as one of the Kiev triumvirate of Yiddish poets, along with Leib Kvitko and Peretz Markish.

Hofshteyn's elegies for Jewish communities devastated by the White movement pogroms appeared in 1922, with illustrations by Marc Chagall. Both had worked together as teachers at shelter for Jewish boys in suburban Malakhovka, which housed and employed boys orphaned by Ukrainian pogroms.

Hofshteyn protested the banning of Hebrew and the persecution of Hebrew writers, arousing the suspicion of the authorities. He therefore emigrated first to Germany and then to Palestine in 1923. In Palestine, he wrote both in Hebrew and Yiddish and published in Yiddish the dramatic poem Sha'ul–Der Letster Meylekh fun Yisroel (Saul–The Last King of Israel, 1924) and an expressionistic drama Meshiekhs Tsaytn (Messianic Times, 1925). He returned to Kyiv in 1926 only to find himself compelled to write poems adulatory of the Communist Party. In 1939, Hofshteyn became a member of the Communist Party. Hofshteyn hailed the establishment of the State of Israel in 1948; however, in the same year, when Joseph Stalin withdrew his support for Israel, Hofshteyn was arrested, together with Kvitko, Markish and other members of the Jewish Anti-Fascist Committee, first transported to Moscow and then to Siberia. He was executed on the Night of the Murdered Poets (August 12–13, 1952), together with twelve other Yiddish writers and artists. After the death of Stalin, they were posthumously rehabilitated, and Hofshteyn's selected works reappeared in a Russian translation in 1958.

== See also ==
- History of the Jews in the Soviet Union
