= Michael Beckerman =

American businessman and lobbyist

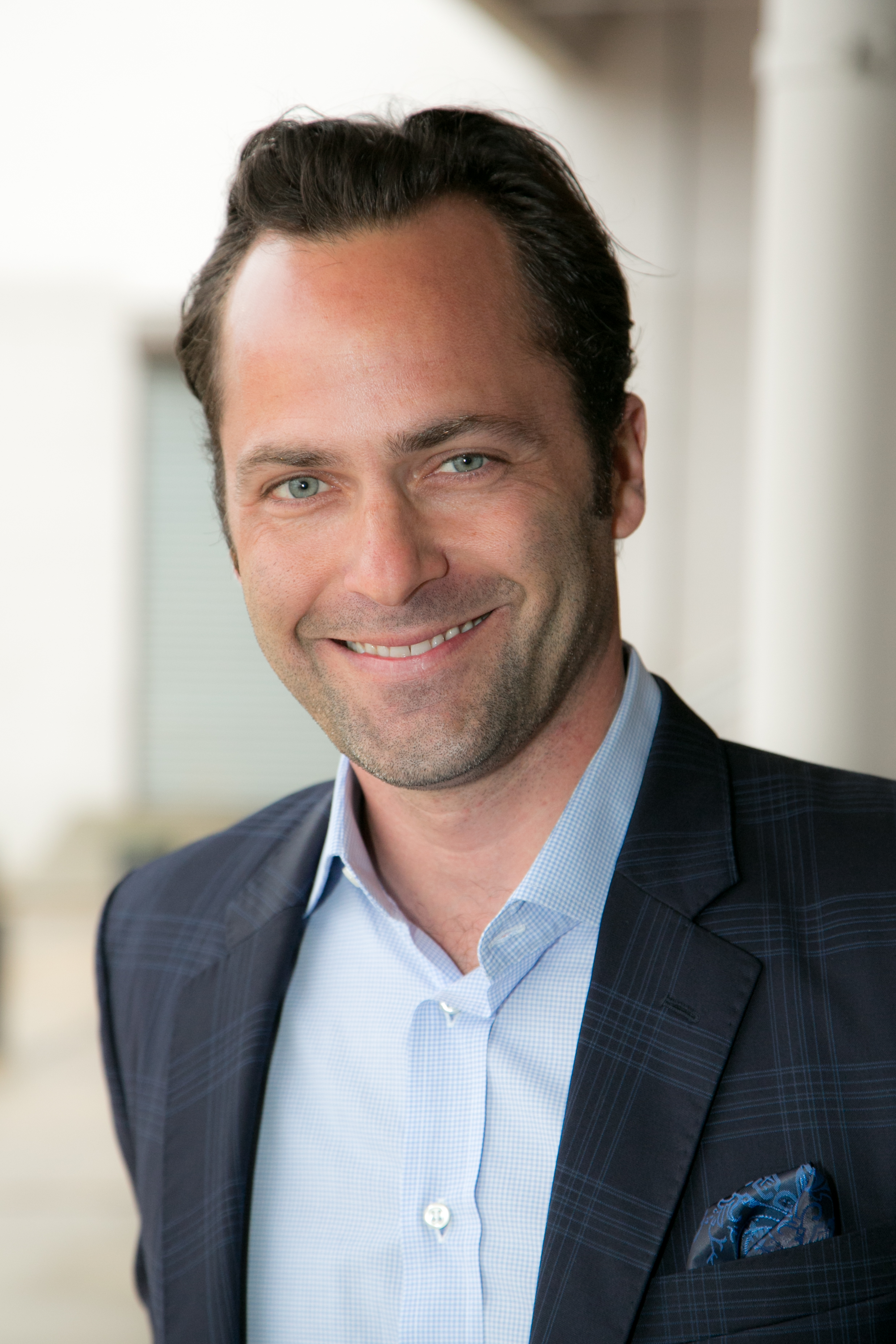
- Education: George Washington University
- Occupation: Lobbyist
- Known for: Net neutrality advocacy

Michael Beckerman is an American lobbyist who is vice president at TikTok. Beckerman joined the short-form video app in February 2020, and leads its government relations office in Washington, DC.

Beckerman was the founding president and CEO of the Internet Association (2012–2021), a Washington, DC–based trade association representing Internet companies. During his tenure as CEO, association membership grew from 14 member companies at its founding to over 40 internet companies.

Beckerman is an expert on internet policy. He appears in the media to offer the industry's perspective on topical policy issues.

== Education ==
Beckerman received his BBA with honors from George Washington University in May 2001.

== Career ==
Beckerman was appointed as president and CEO of Internet Association in July 2012. Prior to his appointment as head of IA, he served for 12 years as the deputy staff director and chief policy advisor to the chairman of the U.S. House Committee on Energy and Commerce, which oversees America's internet policies.

Beckerman also is active in the local angel investing community in Washington, DC, where he has invested in local startups.

Beckerman has testified before Congress on issues relevant to internet use, including privacy, the sharing economy, and social media.

In February 2020, TikTok hired Beckerman to lead its Washington policy operations amidst mounting pressure in Washington over its ties with China.

== See also ==
- Internet Association
- List of industry trade groups in the United States
