= Shloimke Beckerman =

Klezmer clarinetist and bandleader

Shloimke Beckerman (Yiddish: שלומקע בעקערמאַן, c. 1884–1974) also known as Samuel Beckerman, was a klezmer clarinetist and bandleader in New York City in the early twentieth century; he was a contemporary of Dave Tarras and Naftule Brandwein. He was the father of Sid Beckerman, also a klezmer bandleader.

== Biography ==
=== Early life ===
Beckerman was born around May 14 or 15, 1884 in Chudniv, Russian Empire, although on some documents he gave the year as 1886. He was descended from a klezmer family which had a presence in numerous cities in Poland and Ukraine including Chudniv, Proskuriv, Rozhyshche, Rovno, Klevan, Brody, Zamość, and Berdychiv. The musician family originated with his grandfather Solomon (Shloyme) Beckerman, a self-taught violinist and multi-instrumentalist who had led his own klezmer ensemble in Chudniv. (Chudniv was also home to a competing klezmer ensemble led by the famous violinist Alter Chudnover.)

He married his wife Sophia Messer while still in Europe and they had their first four children (Minnie, Tillie, Bessie, and Isidor) before emigrating. For a time they lived in Zamość where Shloimke (pronounced Shlumke by the family) worked. Members of his immediate family emigrated to New York City between 1909 and 1920, including his father Boruch and his five siblings, saxophonist Arye [Harry], Moshe, Elka (Ferman), Freitka (Grynszpan), and trumpeter Motl [Max], while many other members of the extended family relocated to take up orchestra posts in various European capitals. Shloimke himself emigrated in May 1909, sailing to New York City via Hamburg.

=== Music career ===
According to klezmer researcher Joel Rubin, Shloimke was already known on the Lower East Side when he arrived, due to his family connections, and immediately began work as a full-time musician. In the 1910 census, he listed his occupation as "Musician, Theatre". He could read music, play the saxophone, and improvise readily and so quickly found success in both klezmer and mainstream orchestras. Among his regular gigs in the 1910s were the Castles by the Sea dancehall in Long Beach, New York, and in the dance band at Reisenweber's Cafe, as well as in silent film orchestras and at Jewish weddings.

By the early 1920s many of Beckerman's family were working musicians in the New York area, including not only his father, several of his brothers, but his daughter Minnie and various others. In that era, Shloimke recorded some Jewish and other ethnic recordings and was a soloist as well as a member of Paul Whiteman's Orchestra at the Little Club. He also played for a time in Abe Schwartz's orchestra in the mid-1920s, when Naftule Brandwein left that orchestra to found his own at a competing record label. He also recorded a small number of klezmer and Slavic music records together with his longtime collaborator Harry Raderman, a trombone player better known for playing Jazz music.

With the passing of the Immigration Act of 1924 which greatly restricted Jewish immigration from Europe, and then the onset of the Great Depression by 1930, the market for Yiddish and klezmer recordings in the United States saw a steep decline, which essentially ended the recording career of many of the popular bandleaders of the 1910s and 1920s. It does not seem that Shloimke made any more commercial recordings after the mid-1920s. He continued to play gigs well into the 1950s, when he retired to California.

Shloimke Beckerman died in Los Angeles on May 12, 1974.

=== Legacy ===
Joel Rubin notes that Beckerman is less well remembered than his contemporaries Dave Tarras and Naftule Brandwein because he spent much more of his career playing mainstream American music and only recorded a handful of klezmer pieces. Klezmer researcher Hankus Netsky describes Shloimke as playing clarinet with a "heavily ornamented and rhythmically propulsive style", while Rubin and Wollock describe him as being known for his "lebedike finger (lively fingers) and his ability to continually ornament the melodic line, injecting incredible variety and subtlety into his playing." Henry Sapoznik, describing the playing on A Galitzianer Tentsl, says that it "is an intricate melody masterfully played [...] Beckerman's phrasing is breathtaking".

His son Sidney Beckerman was a well known klezmer clarinet player in his own right; he taught many members of the klezmer revival at KlezKamp and died in 2007. His nephew Sammy Beckerman was also a klezmer pianist and accordionist who is best known today for having been a longtime accompanist of Dave Tarras.

In 2007, an audiocassette recording of a live klezmer performance by an elderly Shloimke Beckerman was discovered. There has been discussion of issuing it in some form because he made so few klezmer recordings.

== Selected recordings ==
- Yismehu/Hot azoy (as soloist with Abe Schwartz orchestra, Columbia Phonograph Company, 1923–24)
- T'kies "Shofer blosen"/A Galitziane tentzil (as soloist with Abe Schwartz orchestra, Columbia Phonograph Company, 1924)
- A Europaische Kamaryska/A Europaische Kolomyka (as Raderman's and Beckerman's Orchestra featuring Alex Fiedel, Emerson Records)
- Langsam und Lustig/Sis Freilech Bei Yidden (as Raderman's and Beckerman's Orchestra, Emerson Records)
