= Beckermann =

Beckermann is a German surname. Notable people with the surname include:

- Ansgar Beckermann (born 1945), German analytic philosopher and professor at the University of Bielefeld
- Christoph Beckermann (born 1960), German mechanical engineer and professor at the University of Iowa
- Ruth Beckermann (born 1952), Austrian film producer

== See also ==
- Beckerman
