= Stempenyu =

Klezmer violinist

Stempenyu (Yiddish: סטעמפּעניו; 1822–1879) was the popular name of Iosif Druker (יוסף דרוקער), a klezmer violin virtuoso, bandleader and composer from Berdychiv, Russian Empire. He was one of a handful of celebrity nineteenth century Jewish folk violinists from Ukraine; others included Aron-Moyshe Kholodenko "Pedotser" (also from Berdychiv) and Yechiel Goyzman "Alter Chudnover" from Chudniv. Sholem Aleichem loosely based his 1888 novel Stempenyu: A Jewish Novel on the real-life Stempenyu; it was adapted into various stage and film versions in the twentieth century.

== Biography ==
Iosif (Yossele) Druker was born in Berdychiv, Kiev Governorate, Russian Empire in 1822 (now located in Zhytomyr Oblast, Ukraine). His father, Sholem Druker, was a musically literate klezmer clarinet player and bandleader; according to Joachim Stutschewsky their family may have come from somewhere else in Kiev Governorate, possibly Hornostaipil or Radomyshl. Iosif was sent to Kiev to study violin as a youth. He then returned to Berdychiv and rejoined his father's klezmer orchestra at the age of twelve, although at age fifteen he is thought to have left and spent several years developing his craft in various other towns. When he returned to Berdychiv he eventually took over his father's orchestra. He was said to have masterful control over the violin and to be able to deliver a wide range of emotions and interpretations to his performances. Berdychiv was a large enough to have several competing klezmer ensembles in the late nineteenth century, all with a high level of musicianship: Stempenyu's, Pedotser's, and that of another bandleader named Moyshe-Abe.

Stempenyu is generally said to have died in 1879, although the details are not specified anywhere.

== Legacy ==
The most recognizable legacy of Stempenyu, which has made him a household name for the past century, is that he was fictionalized in Sholem Aleichem's novel Stempenyu: A Jewish Novel, a work rich in ethnographic detail about the klezmer world. Sholem Aleichem traveled to Berdychiv in the 1880s (after Stempenyu had already died) to collect information for his novel. He claimed to have been mostly faithful to the facts he gathered about Stempenyu from older people and fellow musicians in Berdychiv. However, Stutschewsky and others have said that it is difficult to know which parts of the novel were true to the historical figure and which were artistic license. Even Moisei Beregovsky, who visited Berdychiv during the Soviet period, found that Druker's grandchildren took the novel as a factual account of their ancestor's life.

After Druker died, his klezmer ensemble was led by his relative Wolf Cherniavsky (himself a relative of Joseph Cherniavsky and other American musicians). Although his compositions were never published in his lifetime, and Druker died before the age of sound recording, some of his works were passed on and written down by other musicians. A number of these manuscripts have ended up in the collection of the Vernadsky National Library of Ukraine.

== See also ==
- Stępień (surname), pronounced as "Stempien"
