= Joachim Stutschewsky =

Musician and composer

- יהויכין סטוצ'בסקי
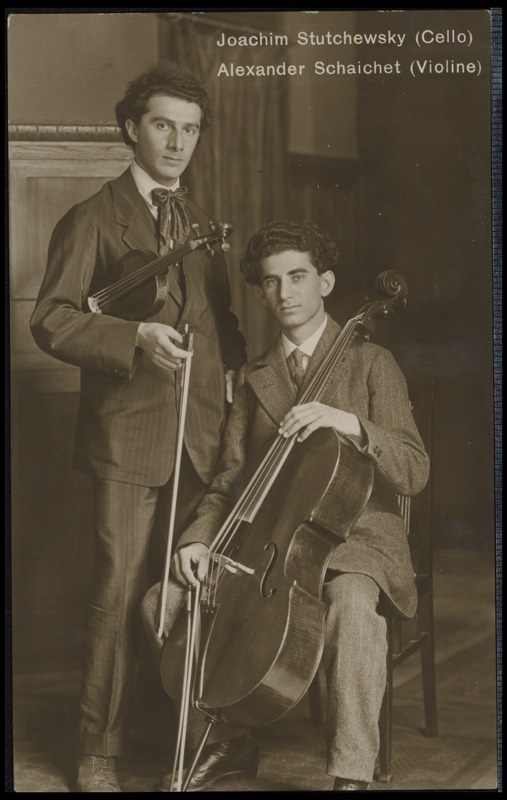
- Joachim Stutschewsky with Alexander Schaichet
- Born: February 7, 1891; Romny, Russian Empire
- Died: 14 November 1982 (aged 91); Tel Aviv, Israel
- Era: 20th century

Joachim-Yehoyachin Stutschewsky (Hebrew: יהויכין סטוצ'בסקי, Russian: Иоахим Стучевский; 7 February 1891, Romny, Russian Empire – 14 November 1982, Tel Aviv, Israel) was a Ukraine-born and Israeli cellist, composer, musicologist.

== Biography ==
Joachim-Yehoyachin Stutschewsky was born on 7 February 1891 in Romny (Ukrainian: Ромни), guberniya of Poltava, Russian Empire, in a family of klezmer musicians. His father, Kalmen-Leyb Stutschewsky was a clarinetist. Stutschewsky started playing the violin at the age of five but soon started playing the cello. He studied at the Royal Conservatory of Music of Leipzig from 1909 to 1912.

He returned to Russian Empire, but after he was smuggled across the border to avoid forced conscription. He then tried to earn his livelihood for a short period of time as a cellist, in Paris and Jena.

He moved to Vienna in 1924 where he joined the Kolisch Quartet. He was spending a lot of time studying Jewish folklore and wrote several musical pieces. He moved to Palestine in 1938.

Throughout his life he was collecting examples of Jewish folklore, especially hasidic melodies. He has written multiple musical pieces for cello and piano. He has also adapted numerous piano pieces for the cello. Many of his compositions directly adapted, or were influenced by, his studies of Jewish music, in the spirit of the Russian-Jewish school.

Stutschewsky was married twice. His first wife was the Swiss cellist Rewekka (Regina) "Wecki" Schein] (1908 - 1999).

Stutschewsky died in Tel Aviv, Israel. His archive can be found in the Felicja Blumental music library (Hebrew: הספרייה במרכז פליציה בלומנטל למוזיקה).
