= Sidney Beckerman (musician) =

Klezmer clarinet player

Sidney Beckerman (1919–2007) was an influential klezmer clarinet player. He learned the style from his father Shloimke, who was himself a well known klezmer soloist. Sidney played Jewish weddings and celebrations in New York City and the Catskills throughout the 1930s. After World War II ended, he returned to New York and started working for the US Postal Service.

Upon his retirement in 1982, he was convinced by fellow klezmer musician Pete Sokolow to join the band Klezmer Plus!. A recording of this band in 1989 (with Howie Leess) was named an Outstanding Folk Recording by the Library of Congress

Sidney was also a founding member of the klezmer music camp Klezkamp.

He was inducted into the People's Hall of Fame in February 1994.
