= Josef Gusikov =

Klezmer musician (1806 - 1837)

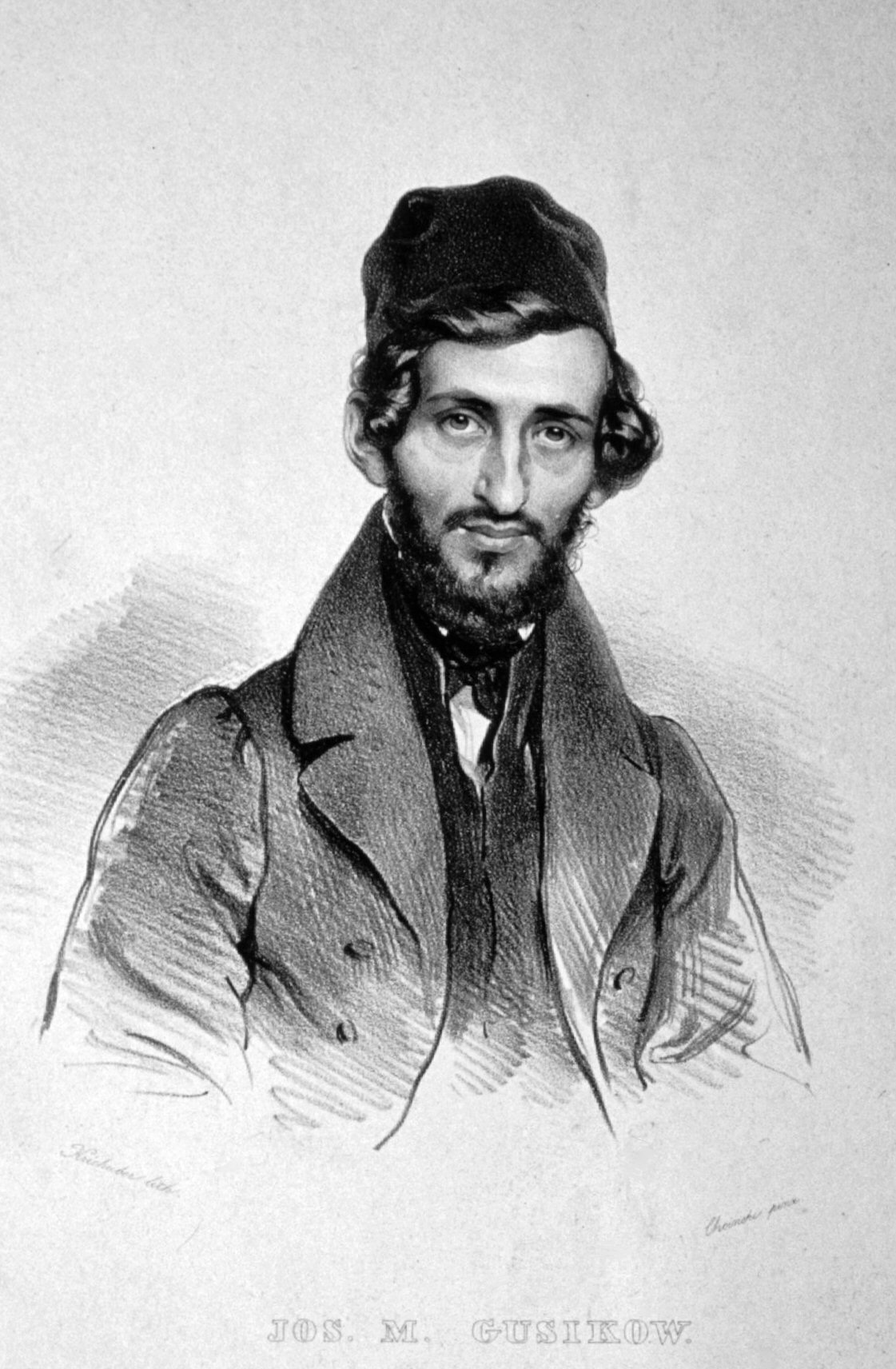
Joseph Gusikov, engraving by Josef Kriehuber

Michal Josef Gusikov (born Yehiel-Michiel, also spelt Guzikow or Gusikow) (2 September 1806 – 21 October 1837) was a Belarusian-Jewish klezmer who gave the first performances of klezmer music to West European concert audiences on his 'wood and straw instrument'.

== Gusikov and his instrument ==
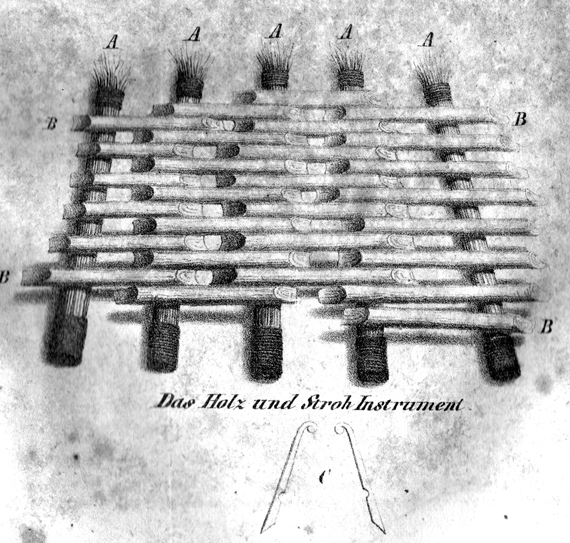
Gusikow's 'wood and straw instrument', from Lewald's 'Europa'

Gusikov was born to a family of klezmer musicians in Shklow (now in Belarus). Originally brought up to play the flute, like his father, a weakness of the lungs forced him to seek a different specialisation. In 1831 he constructed what he called a wood and straw instrument, essentially a xylophone laid out like a cimbalom on a soundboard made from rolls of straw which allowed a loud resonance. There is debate whether this instrument was invented by Gusikov himself, or by his contemporary Samson Jakubowski. On this instrument Gusikov developed an extraordinary virtuosity, and in 1834 gave concerts in Moscow, Kiev and Odessa.

He was heard in a concert in Odessa by the Polish violinist Karol Lipinski, and with the support of Lipinski and the poet Lamartine undertook a concert tour of Western Europe, from 1835 onwards. The concerts, at which Gusikov appeared in traditional Jewish gabardine and was generally accompanied by his relatives on bass and violins, were an extraordinary success; in Paris he was so popular that a coiffure was named after him, imitating his payot. Gusikow played improvisations both on traditional Jewish and klezmer melodies and also on the popular opera tunes of the time. Other locations where he played included Prague, Frankfurt and Vienna.

== Opinions of his music ==
Many professional Jewish musicians were highly impressed by Gusikov. Ferdinand Hiller wrote him a recommendation to Giacomo Meyerbeer. Felix Mendelssohn wrote to his family in 1836:

'I am curious to know whether Gusikow pleased you as much as he did me. He is quite a phenomenon; a famous fellow, inferior to no virtuoso in the world, both in execution and feeling; he therefore delights me more with his instrument of wood and straw than many with their pianofortes.'

Franz Liszt, on the other hand, was more dismissive, calling Gusikov a 'Paganini of the Boulevards' whose 'gift, one might say his genius' would have been better applied to 'inventing an agricultural instrument' whereas his 'talent, being misguided, has produced nothing but musical inanities.'

Gusikov attracted the admiration and friendship of the musicologist François-Joseph Fétis, who wrote a long article about him, based on their discussions in Brussels, in his musical dictionary.

== Death ==
Exhausted by his tour, Gusikov died of tuberculosis in Aachen, his last days embittered by the alleged theft of his precious instrument from his lodgings.

Only one piece of music written by Gusikov has survived, a setting of the Jewish hymn Shir Hama’alot (Psalm 126).

== Sources ==
- The New Grove Dictionary of Music and Musicians ed. Stanley Sadie (1980), ‘Guzikow, Michal Jozef’
- Conway, David. Jewry in Music: Entry to the Profession from the Enlightenment to Richard Wagner. Cambridge University Press, 2011. ISBN 978-1-107-01538-8
- Francois-Joseph Fétis, ‘Biographie universelle des musiciens’ (in French), 2nd edition, Paris, 1870.
- Alex Jacobowitz, Gusikov , articles in his website
- Franz Liszt, ‘Lettres d’un bachelier ès musique’, tr. Charles Suttori, London, 1989
- Felix Mendelssohn, ‘Letters of Felix Mendelssohn Bartholdy’, tr. Lady Wallace, London, 1883
- Rita Ottens and Joel Rubin, 'Klezmer-Musik' (in German), Munich, 1999.
- Joachim Stuschewsky, ‘Haklezmorim, toledotayhem, orekh hahayim. v’yistrotayhem’ (in Hebrew), Jerusalem, 1959.
- Janet Wasserman, Michael Joseph Guzikow (1806-1837): Iconography, article in her website
