= Klezmer =

Style of Jewish music

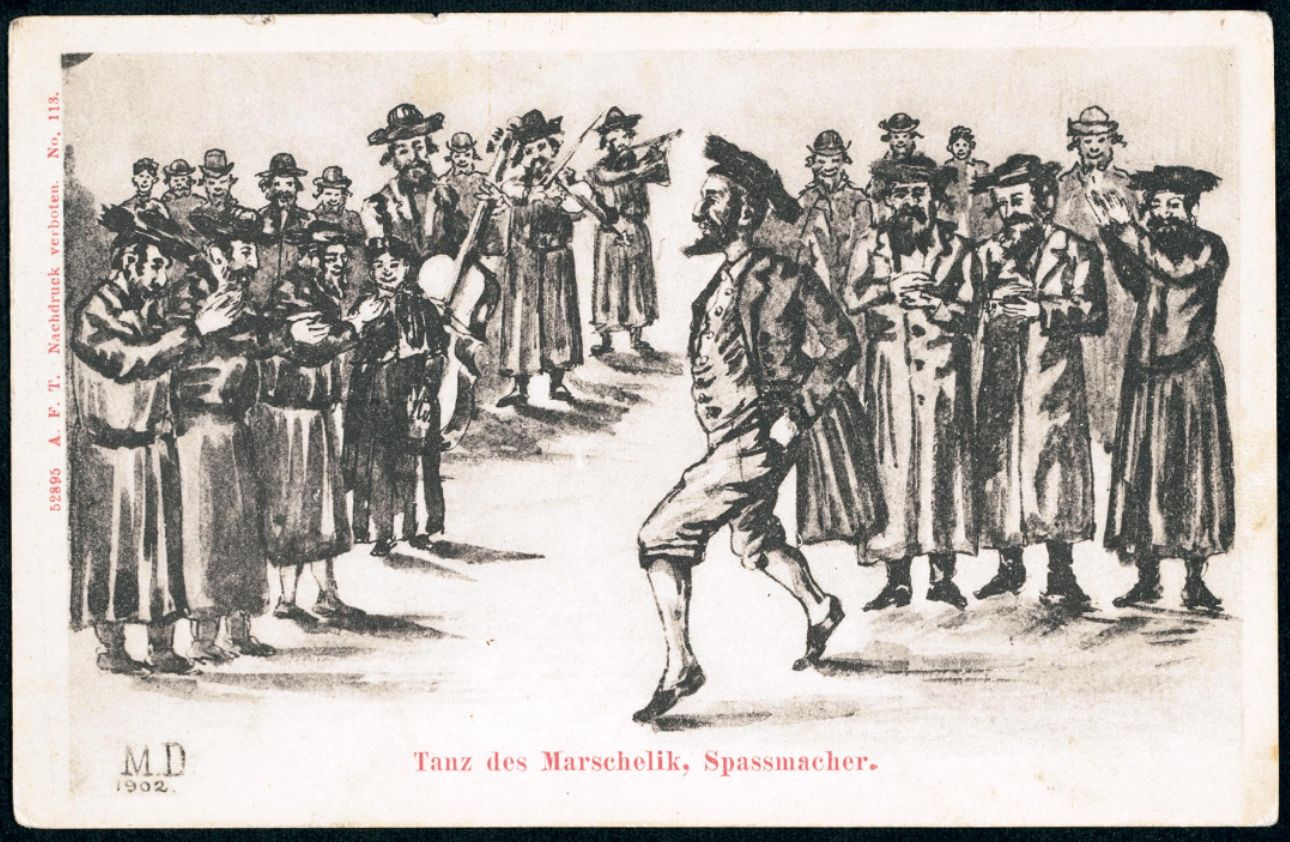
- Native name: קלעזמער
- Other names: Jewish instrumental folk music, Freylekh music
- Stylistic origins: Old European dance music; religious Jewish music; Romanian music; Moldovan music; Ukrainian music; Polish music; Baroque music; Ottoman music; Greek music
- Cultural origins: Ashkenazic Jewish ceremonies, especially weddings, in Eastern Europe
- Typical instruments: Standard orchestra instruments, accordion, cimbalom

Klezmer (Yiddish: כּלי־זמר or קלעזמער, klezmer) is an instrumental musical tradition of the Ashkenazi Jews of Central and Eastern Europe. The essential elements of the tradition include dance tunes, ritual melodies, and virtuosic improvisations played for listening; these would have been played at weddings and other social functions. The musical genre incorporated elements of many other musical genres including Ottoman (especially Greek and Romanian) music, Baroque music, German and Slavic folk dances, and religious Jewish music. As the music arrived in the United States, it lost some of its traditional ritual elements and adopted elements of American big band and popular music. Among the European-born klezmers who popularized the genre in the United States in the 1910s and 1920s were Dave Tarras and Naftule Brandwein; they were followed by American-born musicians such as Max Epstein, Sid Beckerman and Ray Musiker.

After the destruction of Jewish life in Eastern Europe during the Holocaust, and a general fall in the popularity of klezmer music in the United States, the music began to be popularized again in the late 1970s in the so-called Klezmer Revival. During the 1980s and onwards, musicians experimented with traditional and experimental forms of the genre, releasing fusion albums combining the genre with jazz, punk, and other styles. By the 1980s and 1990s the American revival spread to Europe and inspired a new interest in the genre in places such as Germany, France, Poland and Russia. A parallel tradition has also continued in Israel with such figures as Moussa Berlin.

== Etymology and usage ==
The term klezmer, as used in the Yiddish language, has a Hebrew etymology: klei, meaning "tools, utensils or instruments of" and zemer, "melody"; leading to k'lei zemer כְּלֵי זֶמֶר, meaning "musical instruments". Over time the usage of "klezmer" in a Yiddish context evolved to describe musicians instead of their instruments, first in Bohemia in the second half of the sixteenth century and then in Poland, possibly as a response to the new status of the musicians who were at that time forming professional guilds. Previously the musician may have been referred to as a lets (לץ) or other terms. After the term klezmer became the preferred term for these professional musicians in Yiddish-speaking Eastern Europe, other types of musicians were more commonly known as muziker or muzikant. Twentieth-century Russian scholars sometimes used the term "klezmer"; Ivan Lipaev did not use it, but Moisei Beregovsky did when publishing in Yiddish or Ukrainian.

It was not until the late 20th century that the word "klezmer" became a commonly known English-language term. During that time, through metonymy it came to refer not only to the musician but to the musical genre they played, a meaning which it had not had in Yiddish. Early 20th century recording industry materials and other writings had referred to it as Hebrew, Jewish, or Yiddish dance music, or sometimes using the Yiddish term Freilech music ("Cheerful music"). The term 'klezmer' to refer to a genre of music was popularized as a marketing term in the late 1970s by Revival bands; Walter Zev Feldman, whose 1979 LP with Andy Statman used the term, claims credit for this shift in usage.

== Musical elements ==
=== Style ===
The traditional style of playing klezmer music, including tone, typical cadences, and ornamentation, sets it apart from other genres. Although klezmer music emerged from a larger Eastern European Jewish musical culture that included Jewish cantorial music, Hasidic Niguns, and later Yiddish theatre music, it also borrowed from the non-Jewish folk musics of Central and Eastern Europe and from cosmopolitan European musical forms. Therefore it evolved into an overall style which has recognizable elements from all of those other genres.

Few klezmer musicians before the late nineteenth century had conservatory musical training, but they generally learned through apprenticeship and inherited a rich tradition with its own advanced musical techniques. Each musician had their understanding of how the style should be "correctly" performed. The usage of these ornaments was not random; the matters of "taste", self-expression, variation and restraint were and remain important elements of how to interpret the music.

Klezmer musicians apply the overall style to available specific techniques on each melodic instrument. They incorporate and elaborate the vocal melodies of Jewish religious practice, including the vocal style of the Hazzan, Jewish prayer, and paraliturgical song, extending the range of human voice into the musical expression possible on instruments. Among those stylistic elements that are considered typically "Jewish" in klezmer music are those which are shared with cantorial or Hasidic vocal ornaments, including imitations of sighing or laughing. Various Yiddish terms were used for these vocal-like ornaments such as קרעכץ (Krekhts, "groan" or "moan"), קנײטש (kneytsh, "wrinkle" or "fold"), and קװעטש (kvetsh, "pressure" or "stress"). Other ornaments such as trills, grace notes, appoggiaturas, glitshn (glissandos), tshoks (a kind of bent notes of cackle-like sound), flageolets (string harmonics), pedal notes, mordents, slides and typical klezmer cadences are also important to the style. In particular, the cadences which draw on religious Jewish music identify a piece more strongly as a klezmer tune, even if its broader structure was borrowed from a non-Jewish source. Sometimes the term dreydlekh is used only for trills, while other use it for all klezmer ornaments. Unlike in Classical music, vibrato is used sparingly, and is treated as another type of ornament.

The accompaniment style varies depending on instrumentation and context, ranging from playing in octaves without harmonization, to partial chords played by a second violinist, to very elaborate harmonized brass bands arrangements in the twentieth century.

=== Historical repertoire ===
The repertoire of klezmer musicians was very diverse and tied to specific social functions and dances, especially of the traditional wedding. These melodies might have a non-Jewish origin, or have been composed by a klezmer, but only rarely are they attributed to a specific composer. Generally klezmer music can be divided into two broad categories: music for specific dances, and music for listening (at the table, in processions, ceremonial, etc.).

==== Dances ====
Given that Ashkenazic Jewish weddings have taken place in many countries and historical contexts, the dances preserved in klezmer music show a variety of ritual and cultural origins:

- A Freylekhs is the simplest and most widespread type of klezmer dance tunes are those played in 2/4 and intended for group circle dances. Depending on the location this basic dance may also have been called a Redl (circle), Hopke, Khosid, Karahod (round dance, literally the Belarusian translation of the Russian khorovod), Dreydl, Rikudl, etc.
- A bulgar, bulgarish or bolgar is a circle dance originating in Moldavia dance with a recognizable syncopated rhythm in 2/4 or 4/4. It became the most popular klezmer dance form in the United States in the early twentieth century.
- Sher is a contra dance in 2/4, typically arranged for four couples who move together and trade places during the dance. Musically, it sounds like a Freylekhs, but the total number of sections allows the particular dance to be performed. Beregovsky, writing in the 1930s, noted that despite the dance being very commonly played across a wide area, he suspected that it had its roots in an older German dance. This dance continued to be known in the United States even after other complex European klezmer dances had been forgotten.
- Kosher-tants (kosher dance) or mitsve-tants (mitzvah dance) are ritual dances dating back hundreds of years, often in 3/4 and borrowing the form and melodies of a polonaise or a gavotte. Incorporating themes of purity, piety or commitment, the dance sees the bride dancing with the groom or other community members separated by a handkerchief or belt. A Broygez-tants is a related type of dance which involves pantomimes of anger and reconciliation.
- Khosidl, or Khosid, named after Hasidic Jews, is a more dignified embellished dance in 2/4 or 4/4. The dance steps can be performed solo, or in a circle or in a line. Stutschewsky notes that it can contain elements of irony or self-parody.
- Hora or Zhok (from the Romanian Joc) is a circle dance in 3/8 which entered the klezmer repertoire from Romanian and Moldavian music. In the United States, it came to be one of the main dance types after the Bulgar.
- Kolomeike is a fast and catchy dance in 2/4 time, which originated in Ukraine, and is prominent in the folk music of that country.
- Skotshne is generally thought to be a more elaborate Freylekhs which could be played either for dancing or listening. The name, which is of Slavic origin, is thought by some to refer to a hopping movement in the dance.
- Nigun, a very broad term which can refer to melodies for listening, singing or dancing. Usually a mid-paced song in 2/4.
- Waltzes were very popular, whether classical, Russian, or Polish. A padespan was a sort of Russian/Spanish waltz known to klezmers.
- Mazurka and polka, Polish and Czech dances, respectively, were often played for both Jews and Gentiles.
- Kozak or Kozatshke is a dance of Ukrainian origin in 2/4 popular among klezmer musicians.
- Sirba – a Romanian dance in 2/2 or 2/4 (Romanian sârbă). It features hopping steps and short bursts of running, accompanied by triplets in the melody.

==== Non-dance repertoire ====
Historically, klezmer musicians also performed a variety of ritual and listening music which may have been rhythmic or freeform depending on the type. As with dances, these often borrowed from Jewish or non-Jewish folk melodies, religious music, and so on.

- There were a variety of non-metrical, semi-improvised listening genres. The best known is the Doyne borrowed from the Romanian doina. Other lesser known types include the Volekhl, also coming from a Romanian-Moldavian tradition; the Taksim, whose name is borrowed from the Ottoman/Arab Taqsim; and a Fantasia where klezmers would compose variations on a simple musical theme.
- Forms centering on bridal rituals, including the Kale-bazetsn (seating of the bride) or Kale-bazingn (singing to the bride). In these freeform pieces the badchen would sing to the bride as the soloist accompanied with a freeform piece.
- Other more rhythmic listening pieces drew on the Hasidic Nigun. A Tish-nign (table tune) was a melody played for listening at the table; a Moralish (or called Devekut in Hebrew) inspired spiritual arousal or a pious mood. Many of these melodies were sung at the Hasidic table and also performed instrumentally by klezmer musicians.
- A Vals (Waltz), pieces in 3/4 especially in the Hasidic context, may be slower than non-Jewish waltzes and intended for listening while the wedding parties are seated at their tables.
- Processional melodies could have a variety of musical forms or even borrow non-Jewish melodies, and were used to lead wedding parties or other groups as they walked. These include Gas-nigunim (street tunes), Tsum tish (to the table) were used to lead the wedding party around the neighborhood or between different stages of the wedding. According to Beregovski the Gas-nign was always in 3/4 time. Similarly, Marsh (March) could be non-Jewish march melodies adapted into joyful singing or playing contexts. Parting melodies played at the beginning or end of a wedding day, such as the Zay gezunt (be healthy), Dobriden (good day), Dobranotsh or A gute nakht (good night) etc. are closely related.
- Other types of listening music borrowed from the forms and melodies of neighboring cultures, either from folk melodies or non-Jewish dances. A Terkisher is a type of virtuosic solo piece in 4/4 in an Ottoman or "oriental" style, and melodies may incorporate references to Greek Hasapiko into an Ashkenazic musical aesthetic.

=== Orchestration ===
Klezmer music is an instrumental tradition, without much of a history of songs or singing. In Eastern Europe, Klezmers did traditionally accompany the vocal stylings of the Badchen (wedding entertainer), although their performances were typically improvised couplets and the calling of ceremonies rather than songs. (The importance of the Badchen gradually decreased by the twentieth century, although they still continued in some traditions.)

As for the klezmer orchestra, its size and composition varied by time and place. The klezmer bands of the eighteenth and early nineteenth century were small, with roughly three to five musicians playing woodwind or string instruments. Another common configuration in that era was similar to Hungarian bands today, typically a lead violinist, second violin, cello, and cimbalom. In the mid-nineteenth century, the clarinet started to appear in those small Klezmer ensembles as well. In Ukraine, by the last decades of the century the orchestras had grown larger, averaging seven to twelve members; incorporating brass instruments and up to twenty performers for a prestigious occasion. (However, for poor weddings a large klezmer ensemble might only send three or four of its junior members.) In these larger orchestras, on top of the core instrumentation of strings and woodwinds, ensembles often featured cornets, C clarinets, trombones, a contrabass, a large Turkish drum, and several extra violins. The inclusion of Jews in tsarist army bands during the 19th century may also have led to the introduction of typical military band instruments into klezmer. With such large orchestras, the music was arranged so that the bandleader soloist could still be heard at key moments. In Galicia, and Belarus, the smaller string ensemble with cimbalom remained the norm into the twentieth century. American klezmer, as it developed in dancehalls and wedding banquets of the early twentieth century, had a more complete orchestration not unlike those used in popular orchestras of the time. They use a clarinet, saxophone, or trumpet for the melody, and make great use of the trombone for slides and other flourishes.

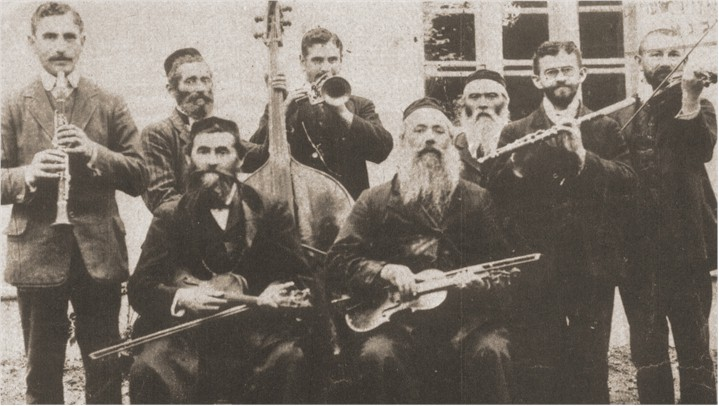
Jewish musicians of Rohatyn (west Ukraine)

The melody in klezmer music was historically generally assigned to the lead violin, although occasionally it went to the flute and eventually clarinet. The other instrumentalists provide harmony, rhythm, and some counterpoint (the latter usually coming from the second violin or viola). The clarinet now often plays the melody. Brass instruments—such as the French valved cornet and keyed German trumpet—eventually inherited a counter-voice role. Modern klezmer instrumentation is more commonly influenced by the instruments of the 19th-century military bands than the earlier orchestras.

Percussion in early 20th-century klezmer recordings was generally minimal—no more than a wood block or snare drum. In Eastern Europe, percussion was often provided by a drummer who played a frame drum, or poyk, sometimes called baraban. A poyk is similar to a bass drum and often has a cymbal or piece of metal mounted on top, which is struck by a beater or a small cymbal strapped to the hand.

=== Melodic modes ===
==== Western, cantorial, and Ottoman music terminology ====
Klezmer music is a genre that developed partly in the Western musical tradition but also in the Ottoman Empire, and is primarily an oral tradition which does not have a well-established literature to explain its modes and modal progression. But, as with other types of Ashkenazic Jewish music, it has a complex system of modes which were used in its compositions. Many of its melodies do not fit well in the major and minor terminology used in Western music, nor is the music systematically microtonal in the way that Middle Eastern music is. Nusach terminology, as developed for cantorial music in the nineteenth century, is often used instead, and indeed many klezmer compositions draw heavily on religious music. But it also incorporates elements of Baroque and Eastern European folk music, making description based only on religious terminology incomplete. Still, since the klezmer revival of the 1970s, the terms for Jewish prayer modes are the most common to describe those used in klezmer. The terms used in Yiddish for these modes include nusach (נוסח); shteyger (שטײגער), "manner, mode of life", which describes the typical melodic character, important notes and scale; and gust (גוסט), a word meaning "taste" which was commonly used by Moisei Beregovsky.

Beregovsky, who was writing in the Stalinist era and was constrained by having to play down klezmer's religious aspects, did not use the terminology of synagogue modes, except in early work in 1929. Instead, he relied on German-inspired musical terminology of major, minor, and "other" modes, which he described in technical terms. In his 1940s works he noted that the majority of the klezmer repertoire seemed to be in a minor key, whether natural minor or others, that around a quarter of the material was in Freygish, and that around a fifth of the repertoire was in a major key.

Another set of terminology sometimes used to describe klezmer music is that of the Makams used in Ottoman and other Middle Eastern music. This approach dates back to Idelsohn in the early twentieth century, who was very familiar with Middle Eastern music, and has been developed in the past decade by Joshua Horowitz.

Finally, some Klezmer music, and especially that composed in the United States from the mid-twentieth century onwards, may not be composed with these traditional modes, but rather built around chords.

==== Description ====
Because there is no agreed-upon, complete system for describing modes in Klezmer music, this list is imperfect and may conflate concepts which some scholars view as separate. Another problem in listing these terms as simple eight-note (octatonic) scales is that it makes it harder to see how Klezmer melodic structures can work as five-note pentachords, how parts of different modes typically interact, and what the cultural significance of a given mode might be in a traditional Klezmer context.

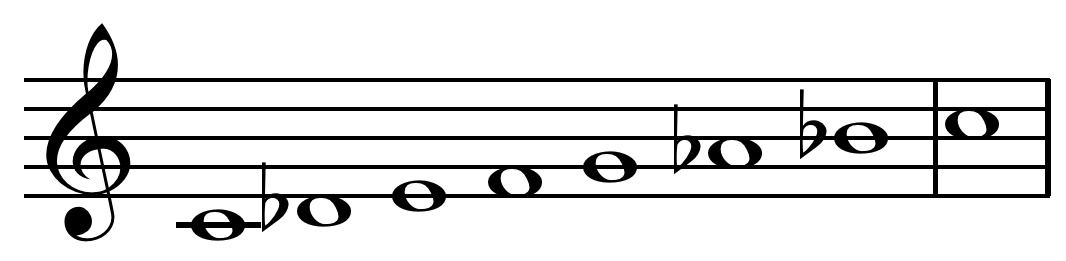
Freygish mode in C

- Freygish, Ahavo Rabboh, or Phrygian dominant scale resembles the Phrygian mode, having a flat second but also a permanent raised third. It is among the most common modes in Klezmer and is closely identified with Jewish identity; Beregovsky estimated that roughly a quarter of the Klezmer music he had collected was in Freygish. Among the most well-known pieces composed in this mode are "Hava Nagila" and "Ma yofus". It is comparable to the Maqam Hijaz found in Arabic music.

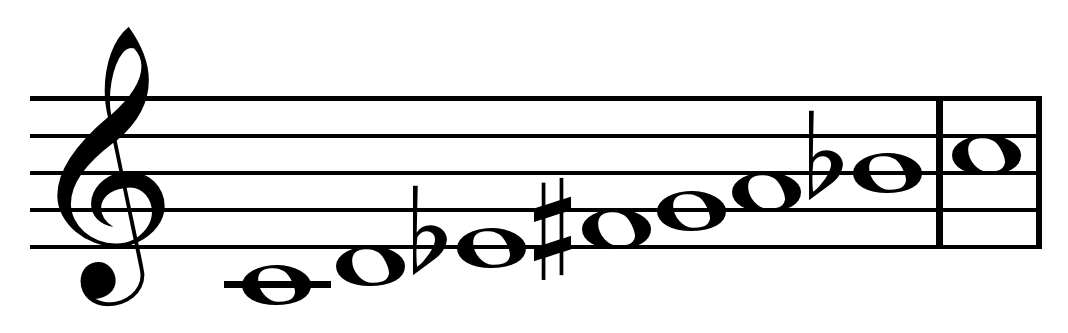
Mi Sheberakh mode in C

- Mi Sheberakh, Av HaRachamim, "altered Dorian" or Ukrainian Dorian scale is a minor mode which has a raised fourth. It is sometimes compared to Nikriz Makamı. It is closely related to Freygish since they share the same pitch intervals. This mode is often encountered in Doynes and other Klezmer forms with connections to Romanian or Ukrainian music.

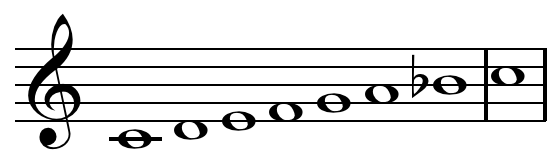
Adonoy Molokh mode in C

- Adonoy Molokh or Adoyshem Molokh a synagogue mode with a flatted seventh. It is sometimes called the "Jewish major". It has some similarities to the Mixolydian mode.

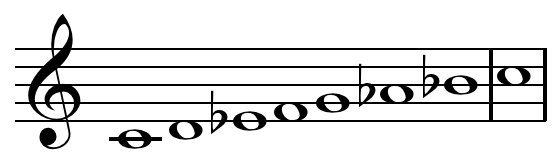
Mogen Ovos mode in C

- Mogen Ovos is a synagogue mode which resembles the Western natural minor. In klezmer music, it is often found in greeting and parting pieces, as well as dance tunes. It has some similarities to the Bayati maqam used in Arabic and Turkish music.
- Yishtabakh resembles Mogen Ovos and Freygish. It is a variant of the Mogen Ovos scale that frequently flattens the second and fifth degrees.

== History ==
=== Europe ===
==== Development of the genre ====
The Bible has several descriptions of orchestras and Levites making music, but after the destruction of the Second Temple in 70 CE, many rabbis discouraged musical instruments. Therefore, while there may have been Jewish musicians in different times and places since then, the concept of a "Klezmer" musician arose much more recently. The earliest written record of the use of the word was identified by Isaac Rivkind as being in a Jewish council meeting from Kraków in 1595. They may have existed even earlier in Prague, as references to them have been found as early as 1511 and 1533. It was in the 1600s that the situation of Jewish musicians in Poland improved, as they gained the right to form Guilds (Khevre), and therefore to set their own fees, hire Christians, and so on. Therefore over time this new form of professional musician developed new forms of music and elaborated this tradition across a wide area of Eastern European Jewish life. The rise of Hasidic Judaism in the late eighteenth century and onwards also contributed to the development of klezmer, due to their emphasis on dancing and wordless melodies as a component of Jewish practice.

==== The Eastern European klezmer profession (1700–1930s) ====
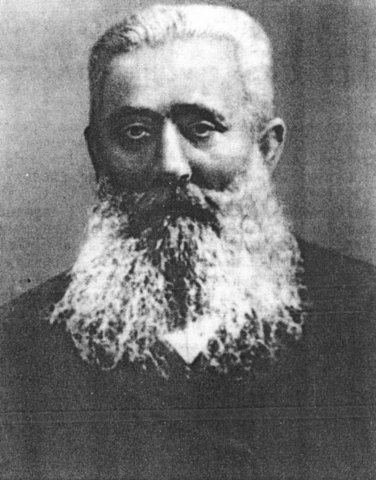
Portrait of Pedotser (A. M. Kholodenko), nineteenth-century klezmer virtuoso

The nineteenth century also saw the rise of a number of klezmer violin virtuosos who combined the techniques of classical violinists such as Ivan Khandoshkin and of Bessarabian folk violinists, and who composed dance and display pieces that became widespread even after the composers were gone. Among these figures were Aron-Moyshe Kholodenko "Pedotser", Yosef Drucker "Stempenyu", Alter Goyzman "Alter Chudnover" and Josef Gusikov. Other klezmer composers, like the Galician cellist Chune Wolfsthal, became Yiddish theatre composers as it emerged as a popular form of entertainment.

Unlike in the United States, where there was a robust Klezmer recording industry, there was relatively less klezmer recorded in Europe in the early twentieth century. The majority of European recordings of Jewish music consisted of Cantorial and Yiddish Theatre music, with only a few dozen known to exist of Klezmer music. These include violin pieces by artists such as Oscar Zehngut, Jacob Gegna, H. Steiner, Leon Ahl, and Josef Solinski; flute pieces by S. Kosch, and ensemble recordings by Belf's Romanian Orchestra, the Russian-Jewish Orchestra, Jewish Wedding Orchestra, and Titunshnayder's Orchestra.

==== Klezmer in the late Russian empire and Soviet era ====
The loosening of restrictions on Jews in the Russian Empire, and their newfound access to academic and conservatory training, created a class of scholars who began to reexamine and evaluate klezmer using modern techniques. Abraham Zevi Idelsohn was one such figure, who sought to find an ancient Middle Eastern origin for Jewish music in the diaspora. There was also new interest in collecting and studying Jewish music and folklore, including Yiddish songs, folk tales, and instrumental music. An early expedition was by Joel Engel, who collected folk melodies in his birthplace of Berdyansk in 1900. The first figure to collect large amounts of klezmer music was Susman Kiselgof, who made several expeditions to the Pale of Settlement from 1907 to 1915. He was soon followed by other scholars such as Moisei Beregovsky and Sofia Magid, Soviet scholars of Yiddish and klezmer music. Most of the materials collected in those expeditions are now held by the Vernadsky National Library of Ukraine.

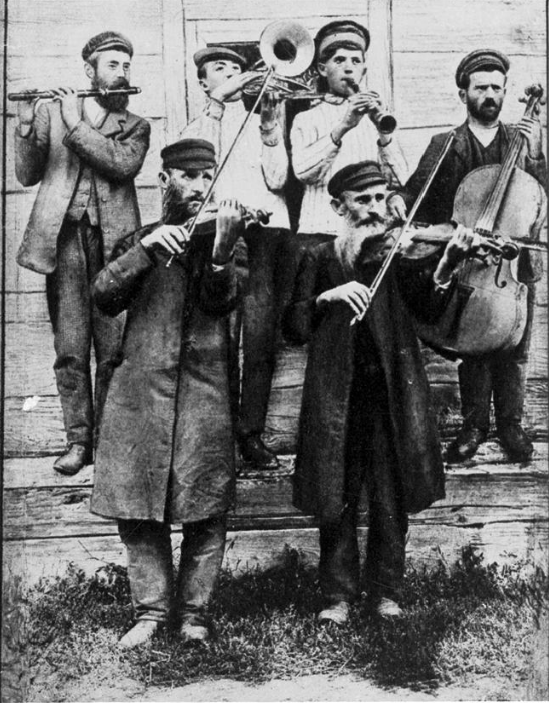
Klezmer musicians at a wedding, Ukraine, c. 1925

Beregovsky, writing in the late 1930s, lamented how little scholars knew about the range of playing technique and social context of Klezmers from past eras, except for the late nineteenth century which could be investigated through elderly musicians who still remembered it.

Jewish music in the Soviet Union, and the continued use of klezmer music, went through several phases of official support or censorship. The officially supported Soviet Jewish musical culture of 1920s involved works based on or satirizing traditional melodies and themes, whereas those of the 1930s were often "Russian" cultural works translated into a Yiddish context. After 1948, Soviet Jewish culture entered a phase of repression, meaning that Jewish music concerts, whether tied to Hebrew, Yiddish, or instrumental klezmer, were no longer allowed to be performed. Moisei Beregovsky's academic work was shut down in 1949 and he was arrested and deported to Siberia in 1951. The repression was eased in the mid-1950s as some Jewish and Yiddish performances were allowed to return to the stage once again. However, the main venue for klezmer has always been traditional community events and weddings, not the concert stage or academic institute; those traditional venues were repressed along with Jewish culture in general, according to anti-religious Soviet policy.

=== United States ===
==== Early American klezmer (1880s–1910s) ====
The first klezmers to arrive in the United States followed the first large waves of Eastern European Jewish immigration which began after 1880, establishing themselves mainly in large cities like New York, Philadelphia and Boston. Klezmers—often younger members of klezmer families, or less established musicians—mainly came from the Russian Empire, the Kingdom of Romania and Austria-Hungary. Some of them found work in restaurants, dance halls, union rallies, wine cellars, and other modern venues in places like New York's Lower East Side. But the major source of income for klezmer musicians seems to have remained weddings and Simchas, as in Europe. Those early generations of klezmers are much more poorly documented than those working in the 1910s and 1920s; many never recorded or published music, although some are remembered through family or community history, such as the Lemish klezmer family of Iași, Romania, who arrived in Philadelphia in the 1880s and established a klezmer dynasty there.

==== Big band klezmer orchestras (1910s–1920s) ====
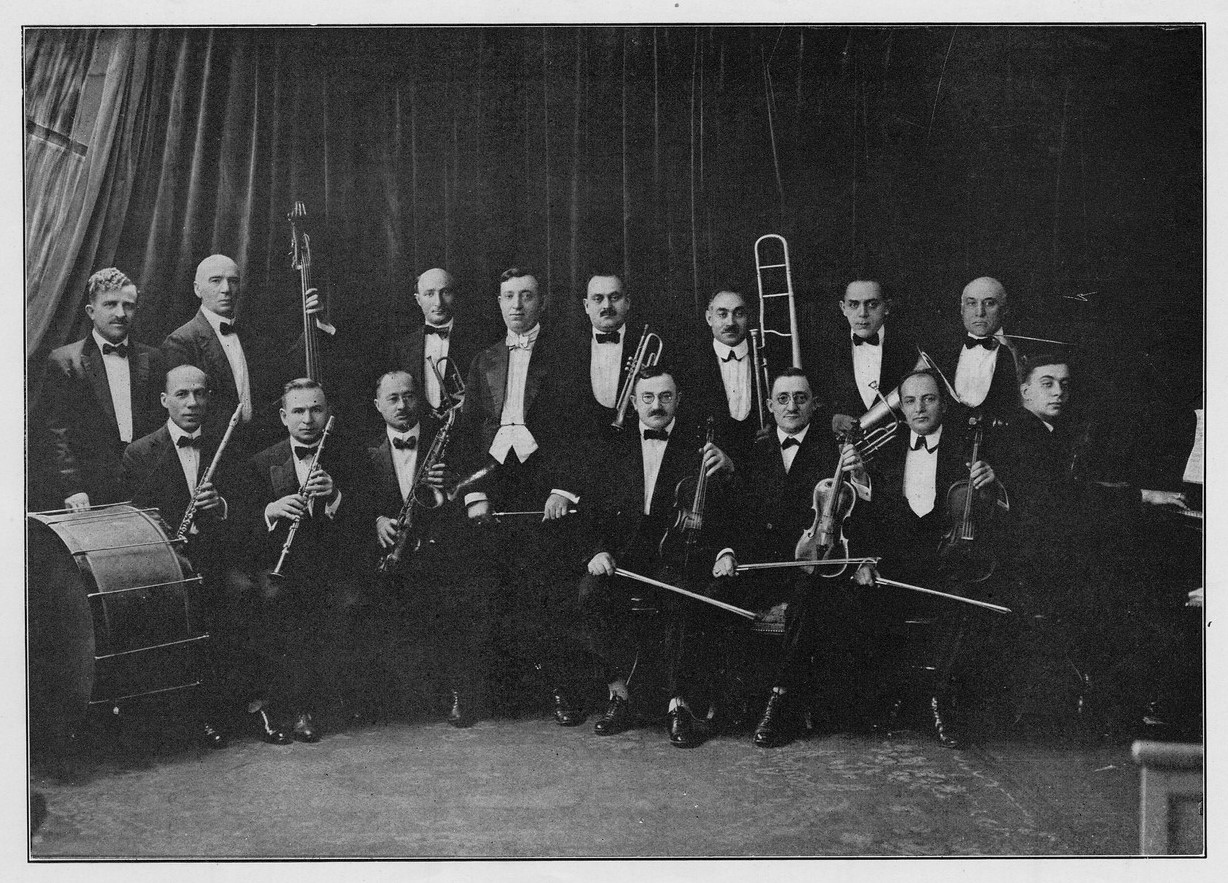
Max Leibowitz orchestra from 1921

The vitality of the Jewish music industry in major American cities attracted ever more klezmers from Europe in the 1910s. This coincided with the development of the recording industry, which recorded a number of these klezmer orchestras. By the time of the First World War, the industry turned its attention to ethnic dance music and a number of bandleaders were hired by record companies such as Edison Records, Emerson Records, Okeh Records, and the Victor Recording Company to record 78 rpm discs. The first of these was Abe Elenkrig, a barber and cornet player from a klezmer family in Ukraine whose 1913 recording Fon der Choope (From the Wedding) has been recognized by the Library of Congress.

Among the European-born klezmers recording during that decade were some from the Ukrainian territory of the Russian Empire (Abe Elenkrig, Dave Tarras, Shloimke Beckerman, Joseph Frankel, and Israel J. Hochman), some from Austro-Hungarian Galicia (Naftule Brandwein, Harry Kandel and Berish Katz), and some from Romania (Abe Schwartz, Max Leibowitz, Max Yankowitz, Joseph Moskowitz).

The mid-1920s also saw a number of popular novelty "Klezmer" groups which performed on the radio or vaudeville stages. These included Joseph Cherniavsky's Yiddish-American Jazz Band, whose members would dress as parodies of Cossacks or Hasidim. Another such group was the Boibriker Kapelle, which performed on the radio and in concerts trying to recreate a nostalgic, old-fashioned Galician Klezmer sound. With the passing of the Immigration Act of 1924, which greatly restricted Jewish immigration from Europe, and then the onset of the Great Depression by 1930, the market for Yiddish and klezmer recordings in the United States saw a steep decline, which essentially ended the recording careers of many of the popular bandleaders of the 1910s and 1920s, and made the large klezmer orchestra less viable.

==== Celebrity clarinetists ====
Along with the rise of klezmer "big bands" in the 1910s and 1920s, a handful of Jewish clarinet players who had led those bands became celebrities in their own right, with a legacy that lasted into subsequent decades. The most popular among these were Naftule Brandwein, Dave Tarras, and Shloimke Beckerman.

==== Klezmer revival ====
In the 1970s there was a renewal of interest in Klezmer music centered primarily in the United States. Notable early figures and groups were Giora Feidman, The Klezmorim, Walter Zev Feldman, Andy Statman, and the Klezmer Conservatory Band. They drew their repertoire from recordings and surviving musicians of U.S. klezmer. In particular, clarinetists such as Dave Tarras and Max Epstein became mentors to this new generation of klezmer musicians. In 1985, Henry Sapoznik and Adrienne Cooper founded KlezKamp to teach klezmer and other Yiddish music.

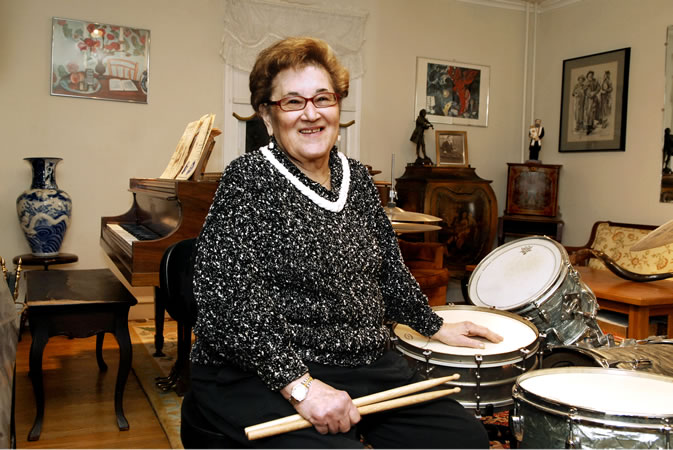
Elane Hoffman Watts, klezmer drummer, in 2007

The 1980s saw a second wave of revival, as interest grew in more traditionally inspired performances with string instruments, largely with non-Jews of the United States and Germany. Musicians began to track down older European klezmer by listening to recordings, finding transcriptions, and making field recordings of the few klezmorim left in Eastern Europe. Key performers in this style are Joel Rubin, Budowitz, Khevrisa, Di Naye Kapelye, Yale Strom, The Chicago Klezmer Ensemble, The Maxwell Street Klezmer Band, the violinists Alicia Svigals, Steven Greenman, Cookie Segelstein and Elie Rosenblatt, flutist Adrianne Greenbaum, and tsimbl player Pete Rushefsky. Bands like Brave Old World, Hot Pstromi and The Klezmatics also emerged during this period.

In the 1990s, musicians from the San Francisco Bay Area helped further interest in klezmer music by taking it into new territory. Groups such as the New Klezmer Trio inspired a new wave of bands merging klezmer with other forms of music, such as John Zorn's Masada and Bar Kokhba, Naftule's Dream, Don Byron's Mickey Katz project and violinist Daniel Hoffman's klezmer/jazz/Middle-Eastern fusion band Davka. The New Orleans Klezmer All-Stars also formed in 1991 with a mixture of New Orleans funk, jazz, and klezmer styles.

Starting in 2008, "The Other Europeans" project, funded by several EU cultural institutions, spent a year doing intensive field research in the region of Moldavia under the leadership of Alan Bern and scholar Zev Feldman. They wanted to explore klezmer and lăutari roots, and fuse the music of the two "other European" groups. The resulting band now performs internationally.

A separate klezmer tradition had developed in Israel in the 20th century. Clarinetists Moshe Berlin and Avrum Leib Burstein are known exponents of the klezmer style in Israel. To preserve and promote klezmer music in Israel, Burstein founded the Jerusalem Klezmer Association, which has become a center for learning and performance of klezmer music in the country.

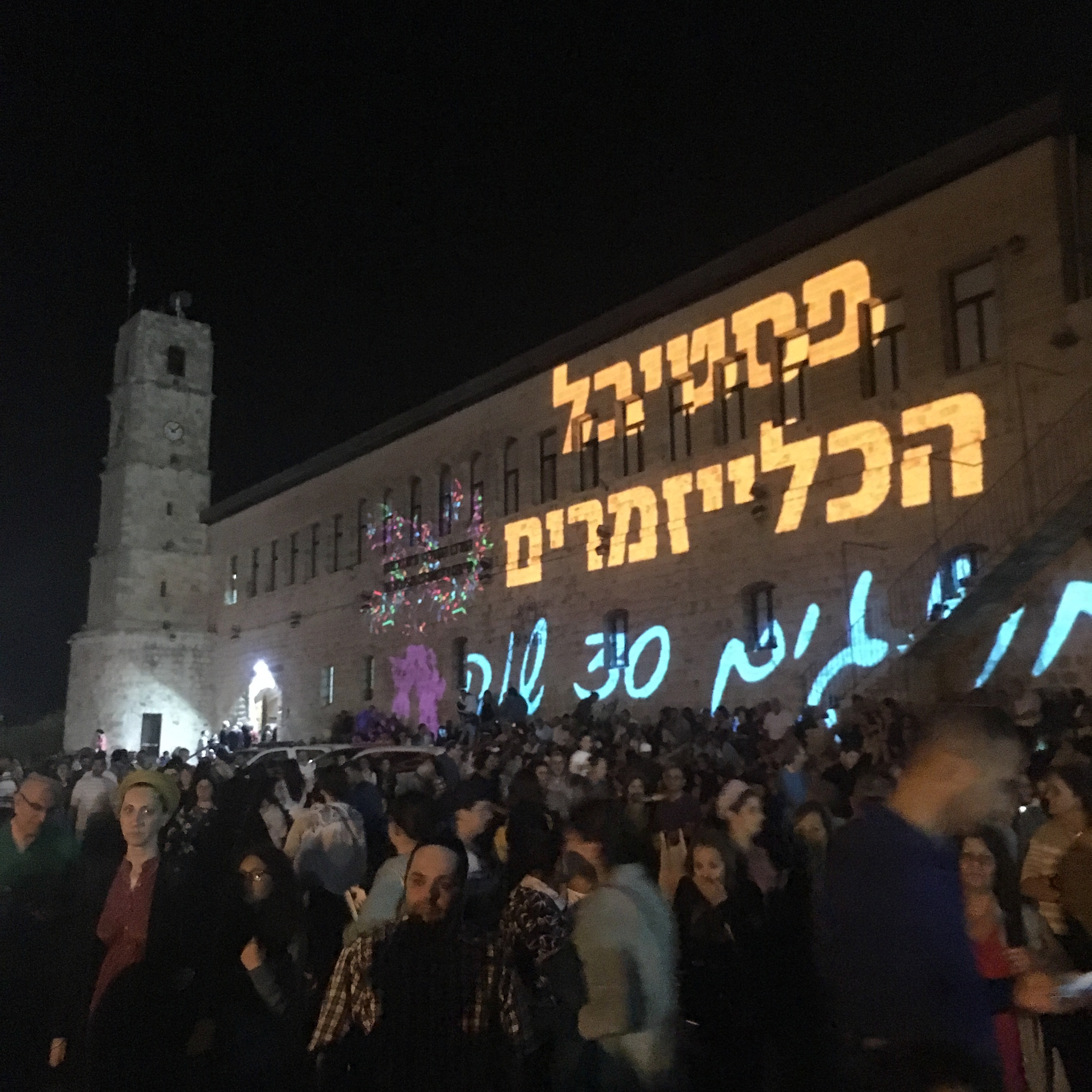
30th anniversary of Klezmer festival in Safed

Since the late 1980s, an annual klezmer festival is held every summer in Safed, in the north of Israel.

== Popular culture ==
=== In music ===
While traditional performances may have been on the decline, many Jewish composers who had mainstream success, such as Leonard Bernstein and Aaron Copland, were still influenced by the klezmeric idioms heard during their youth (as Gustav Mahler had been). George Gershwin was familiar with klezmer music, and the opening clarinet glissando of "Rhapsody in Blue" suggests this influence, although the composer did not compose klezmer directly. Some clarinet stylings of swing jazz bandleaders Benny Goodman and Artie Shaw can be interpreted as having been derived from klezmer, as can the "freilach swing" playing of other Jewish artists of the period such as trumpeter Ziggy Elman.

At the same time, non-Jewish composers turned to klezmer for a prolific source of fascinating thematic material. Dmitri Shostakovich in particular admired klezmer music for embracing both the ecstasy and the despair of human life, and quoted several melodies in his chamber masterpieces, the Piano Quintet in G minor, op. 57 (1940), the Piano Trio No. 2 in E minor, op. 67 (1944), and the String Quartet No. 8 in C minor, op. 110 (1960).

The compositions of Israeli-born composer Ofer Ben-Amots incorporate aspects of klezmer music, most notably his 2006 composition Klezmer Concerto. The piece is for klezmer clarinet (written for Jewish clarinetist David Krakauer), string orchestra, harp and percussion.

=== In visual art ===
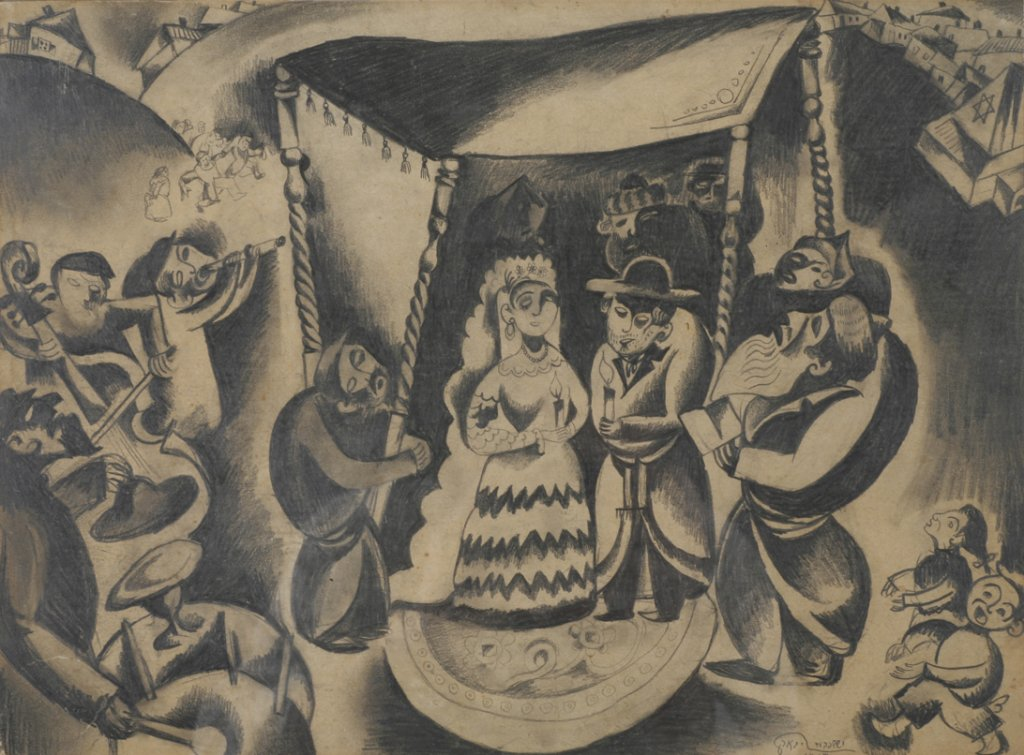
Issachar Ber Ryback - Wedding Ceremony

The figure of the klezmer, as a romantic symbol of nineteenth century Jewish life, appeared in the art of a number of twentieth century Jewish artists such as Anatoly Kaplan, Issachar Ber Ryback, Marc Chagall, and Chaim Goldberg. Kaplan, making his art in the Soviet Union, was quite taken by the romantic images of the Klezmer in literature, and in particular in Sholem Aleichem's Stempenyu, and depicted them in rich detail.

=== In film ===
- Yidl Mitn Fidl (1936), directed by Joseph Green
- Fiddler on the Roof (1971), directed by Norman Jewison
- Les Aventures de Rabbi Jacob (1973), directed by Gérard Oury
- Jewish Soul Music: The Art of Giora Feidman (1980), directed by Uri Barbash
- A Jumpin' Night in the Garden of Eden (1988), directed by Michal Goldman
- Fiddlers on the Hoof (1989), directed by Simon Broughton
- The Last Klezmer: Leopold Kozlowski: His Life and Music (1994), directed by Yale Strom
- Beyond Silence (1996), about a klezmer-playing clarinetist, directed by Charlotte Link
- A Tickle in the Heart (1996), directed by Stefan Schwietert
- Itzhak Perlman: In the Fiddler's House (1996), aired 29 June 1996 on Great Performances (PBS/WNET television series)
- L'homme est une femme comme les autres (1998, directed by Jean-Jacques Zilbermann with soundtrack by Giora Feidman)
- Dummy (2002), directed by Greg Pritikin
- Klezmer on Fish Street (2003), directed by Yale Strom
- Le Tango des Rashevski (2003) directed by Sam Garbarski
- Klezmer in Germany (2007), directed by Kryzstof Zanussi and C. Goldie
- A Great Day on Eldridge Street (2008), directed by Yale Strom
- The "Socalled" Movie (2010), directed by Garry Beitel
- The Klezmer Project, 2023 Argentine documentary

=== In literature ===
In Jewish literature, the klezmer was often represented as a romantic and somewhat unsavory figure. However, in nineteenth century works by writers such as Mendele Mocher Sforim and Sholem Aleichem they were also portrayed as great artists and virtuosos who delighted the masses. Klezmers also appeared in non-Jewish European literature, such as in the epic poem Pan Tadeusz, which depicted a character named Jankiel Cymbalist, or in the short stories of Leopold von Sacher-Masoch. In George Eliot's Daniel Deronda (1876), the German Jewish music teacher is named Herr Julius Klesmer. The novel was later adapted into a Yiddish musical by Avram Goldfaden titled Ben Ami (1908).

== See also ==
- List of klezmer bands
- List of klezmer musicians
- Middle Eastern dance
- Secular Jewish music
