= Israel J. Hochman =

American klezmer bandleader

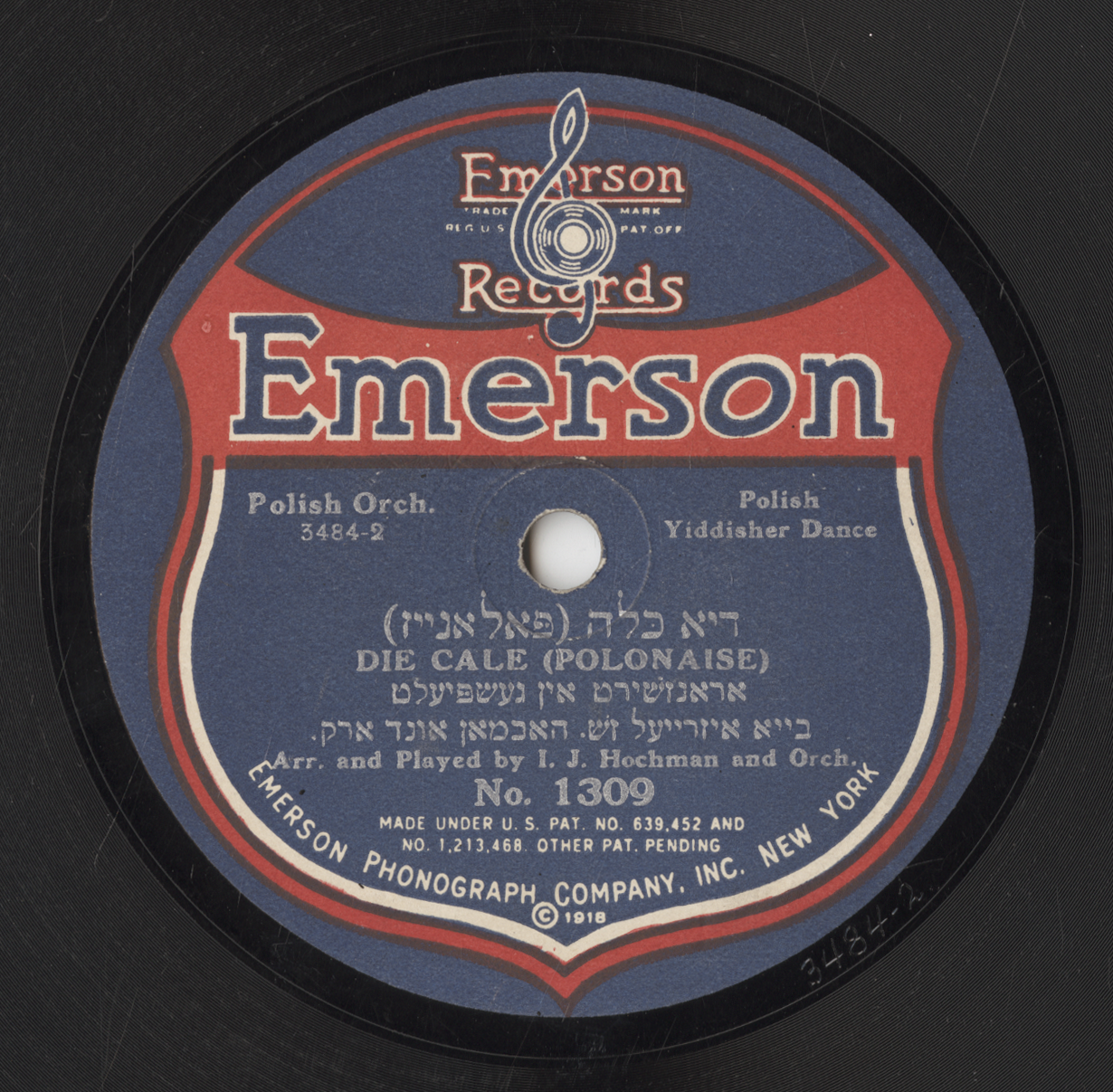
I. J. Hochman and Orchestra - Die Cale (Polonaise) record label

Israel J. Hochman (Yiddish: ישראל האָכמאַן, 1872–1940) was a Russian-born Jewish American violinist, klezmer bandleader, music arranger, and recording artist in early Twentieth Century New York City. He recorded prolifically for Edison Records, Emerson Records, Okeh Records, and Brunswick Records during the period of 1916 to 1924. He was one of a handful of bandleaders such as Abe Schwartz, Joseph Frankel and Max Leibowitz whose recordings are considered to make up the golden age of American klezmer.

== Biography ==
=== Early life ===
Hochman was born in Kamianets-Podilskyi, Podolian Governorate, Russia on 3 April 1872. Little is known about his family background, musical education or whether he was from a Klezmer family. He emigrated to the United States around 1906 with his wife Victoria "Witte" (née Goldstein) and three children, sailing from Rotterdam to New York City. His parents were named Jacob Hochman and Maria (Chaja or Miriam Chaie) Bechter; according to the 1910 US census at least his mother emigrated with the family as well.

=== Music career ===
What he did for the first decade after his emigration to the United States is also not clear, but his recording career began in 1916 at Victor Records. His first recordings seem to have been as arranger and bandleader of a group accompanying Yiddish singer Jacob Jimmalmon in January 1916; months later he returned to make some test recordings of instrumental klezmer music which were never released. In March 1918 he also participated in recording sessions at Victor directing Max Leibowitz's orchestra, although these were also never released. The first group of klezmer recordings he made which were actually released seem to have been in 1918; he recorded Hasidic-inspired and Ukrainian Jewish dance pieces for Brunswick Records in July and Edison Records in December. By 1919 he had moved to Emerson Records as an arranger and conductor for singers such as Joseph Feldman, Clara Gold, and Simon Paskal.

It was during the period of 1918 to 1922 that he recorded most of his klezmer and other instrumental music recordings with orchestras variously called I. J. Hochman's Jewish Orchestra, Hochman's Orchestra, I. J. Hochman's Yiddisher Orchester, and so on. These recordings were made on Edison Records, Okeh Records, and Brunswick Records. These few years were the height of interwar klezmer recording in New York, and Hochman was part of a cohort of Ukrainian-born bandleaders and recording artists which included Joseph Frankel, Joseph Cherniavsky, Abe Elenkrieg. Klezmer researcher Hankus Netsky notes the orchestration style used by Hochman in his klezmer recordings was shared with Abe Schwartz, Abraham Elenkrieg, and Harry Kandel, with a large brassy sound.

With the passing of the Immigration Act of 1924 which greatly restricted Jewish immigration from Europe, and then the onset of the Great Depression by 1930, the market for Yiddish and klezmer recordings in the United States saw a steep decline, which essentially ended the recording career of many of the popular bandleaders of the 1910s and 1920s. Hochman's 78 rpm recording career does not seem to have continued past 1924, a year in which he made a round of Polish dance recordings for Edison Records.

By 1930 he listed his occupation in the US census as a private piano teacher in The Bronx. He also continued to perform with a string ensemble which played a variety of light classical and Jewish pieces. His main musical output in the 1930s seems to have been composing, arranging and direction in a series of films by a little-known director named George Roland. These were Joseph in the Land of Egypt (1932), The Wandering Jew (1933), and A Daughter of Her People (1933).

Hochman died on December 2, 1940, in Manhattan. He was killed in a traffic collision while crossing the street with Abraham Ratfogl, another violinist who survived. He was buried at the Beth David Cemetery in Elmont, New York.

== Legacy ==
During the Klezmer revival of the late 1970s and onwards, there was renewed interest in Hochman's recorded music. Tracks of his appeared on reissue compilations such as Klezmer Music 1910-1942 (Folkways Records, 1981), Klezmer Pioneers: European and American Recordings, 1905-1952 (Rounder Records, 1993), and Klezmer Music - Early Yiddish Instrumental Music - The First Recordings: 1908-1927 (Arhoolie Records, 1997). In 1993 Global Village Music released a reissue CD specifically of his music called I. J. Hochman: Fun der Khupe, Master of Klezmer Music.

=== Family ===
According to the 1920 US Census, Israel and Victoria Hochman had three children who were born in Europe (May, Jack, and Rose), as well as four more who were born in the United States (Max, Sadie, Joseph, and Milton). Victoria died on October 4, 1932, at age 55. In 1936 Israel remarried to his second wife, Sadie Zwirn.
