= The Klezmorim =

American Klezmer revival band

- Origin: Berkeley, California, United States
- Genres: Klezmer, jazz
- Years active: 1975–1993, 2004
- Labels: Arhoolie, Flying Fish, Le Chant du Monde, MW
- Website: klezmo.com

The Klezmorim, founded in Berkeley, California, in 1975, was the world's first klezmer revival band, widely credited with spearheading the global renaissance of klezmer (Eastern European Yiddish instrumental music) in the 1970s and 1980s. Initially featuring flute and strings—notably the exotic fiddling of co-founder David Skuse—the ensemble reorganized into a "loose, roaring, funky" brass/reed/percussion band fronted by co-founder Lev Liberman's saxophones and founding member David Julian Gray's clarinets. As a professional performing and recording ensemble focused on recreating the lost sounds of early 20th century klezmer bands, The Klezmorim achieved crossover success, garnering a Grammy nomination in 1982 for their album Metropolis and selling out major concert venues across North America and Europe, including Carnegie Hall (twice in 1983) and L'Olympia in Paris. The band performed steadily until 1993, regrouping in 2004 for a European tour.

== Venues and audiences ==
The Berkeley, California street-busking duo of violinist David Skuse and flutist Lev Liberman grew in 1975 (with the addition of David Julian Gray, Laurie Chastain, and Gregory Carageorge) into a Balkan/Yiddish party and wedding quintet known briefly as the Sarajevo Folk Ensemble. Making their public debut as The Klezmorim in two concerts at the Berkeley Public Library in April 1976, the musicians soon landed a monthly gig at the Freight & Salvage Coffeehouse. There they were discovered by folklorist and record producer Chris Strachwitz (himself a former refugee from Central Europe), who signed the band to Arhoolie Records and began recording them in the studio.

Liberman spent months cataloguing the treasure trove of Yiddish records salvaged by Seymour Fromer, firebrand director of the Judah Magnes Museum in Berkeley CA and studying the music. But failing to connect with the organized Jewish community—which at the time regarded The Klezmorim's unique repertoire of long-forgotten Yiddish instrumental tunes as disturbingly alien—the band made its initial reputation performing at mainstream public venues such as folk clubs and dance halls.

By 1979, with two record albums (East Side Wedding and Streets of Gold) receiving airplay on listener-sponsored and college radio stations, The Klezmorim had embarked on a rigorous touring schedule, disseminating their groundbreaking concept and repertoire throughout North America and inspiring a second wave of klezmer bands like Kapelye and the Klezmer Conservatory Band. For the next decade and more, The Klezmorim spent half of each year on the road, attracting sellout crowds to appearances at universities, concert halls, cabarets, and music festivals. Ticket sales were boosted by same-day live radio or TV broadcasts, or by unannounced appearances on streetcorners and in public plazas – which were sometimes, to the band's amusement, broken up by the police.

Over time, The Klezmorim's prankish humor and spontaneous banter evolved into a semi-polished show inspired by the theatrically excessive Mystic Knights of the Oingo Boingo. The Klezmorim acknowledged their own street-busker roots in a series of collectively written minimalist stage spectacles melding New Vaudeville with agitprop, evoking the social turmoil that propelled 19th-century Eastern European klezmer musicians into Jazz Age America. A Parisian reviewer described the act as "a voyage on a Hell-bound train from Poland to Brooklyn via Mississippi which leaves the audience thunderstruck." The band members called it "a fast-moving, surreal cabaret revue... Vaudeville meets the Twilight Zone" and admitted to borrowing dramatic riffs from Grand Guignol, Kabuki theatre, tent revival meetings, protest rallies, and Betty Boop cartoons. The Klezmorim's rowdy genre-bending reached its peak in a 1983 collaboration with The Flying Karamazov Brothers, appearing jointly as a juggling/klezmer supergroup at Stanford University and San Francisco's Palace of Fine Arts.

"Rogueish swagger" aside, The Klezmorim were serious musicians who rehearsed rigorously and broke through formidable barriers in championing their obscure genre. Rejecting the music establishment's tendency to pigeonhole them as a "folk" or "ethnic" act, The Klezmorim asserted that they could play for anybody, anywhere, without commercializing their vintage musical style. They did attract a mixed bag of fans including devotees of classical music, jazz, musical theatre, world music, and avant-garde performance art. Their audiences spanned the spectrum of demographic diversity, including small children, "screaming teenaged girls," prison inmates, "college students and white-collar workers in their 20s and 30s," Jews, African-Americans, and Indian people. The Klezmorim's artistic credibility was secured by two standing-room-only concerts at Carnegie Hall in February 1983.

Throughout the 1980s, the band pursued media exposure through public radio broadcasts and appearances on television variety shows. Soundtracks or onscreen roles in documentaries, plays, and films helped The Klezmorim achieve recognition as upstart contributors to popular culture. The San Francisco rock glitterati honored the ensemble with Bammy Award nominations in 1978, 1979, and 1984, a distinction echoed when the National Academy of Recording Arts and Sciences nominated The Klezmorim's album Metropolis for a Grammy Award.

By the mid-1980s, the band had been discovered by jazz aficionados and rock'n'rollers on both sides of the Atlantic. European audiences, approaching klezmer music via familiarity with Romani musicians and traveling circus acts, responded to The Klezmorim's street-party vibe—particularly in The Netherlands, Germany, and France, where the band headlined at jazz festivals and achieved minor popstardom. In France, Belgium, and Switzerland (and occasionally in California), the band performed entire concerts speaking in French.

== Repertoire and style ==
The Klezmorim's repertoire mostly consisted of pre-1930 Russian, Ukrainian, and Romanian Yiddish instrumental music – bluesy, moody doinas or lively dances such as the joc, sirba, bulgar, volakh, freylekhs, honga, and kolomeyke – gleaned from 78-rpm discs and manuscripts made available by the Judah Magnes Museum, Professor Martin Schwartz of UC Berkeley, and other collectors including jazz historian Richard Hadlock. The Klezmorim were largely responsible for re-introducing the repertoire of 1920s clarinetist Naftule Brandwein into the klezmer canon, along with big-band klezmer melodies of Abe Schwartz, Harry Kandel, Art Shryer, and Joseph Cherniavsky.

Much like the eclectic klezmer musicians of prior eras, The Klezmorim peppered their repertoire with Balkan brass or 1920s jazz tunes displaying some modal or historic affinity to klezmer and performed in a hybrid klezmer-jazz style. Yet the ensemble's aesthetic remained rooted in Romania and Tsarist Russia in an ongoing attempt to recreate sounds from before the dawn of the recording era. Performances eventually grew to include klezmer-fusion compositions by band members Ben Goldberg ("Peggy's Rice Hill", "Stick Out Head"), Lev Liberman ("Mardi Gras in Minsk", "Lev's Czech", "Diary of a Scoundrel"), and Stuart Brotman ("Waltz Roman à Clef"). But little of this more experimental repertoire appeared on the band's six record albums.

The Klezmorim's ensemble interaction was much noted by the press. A typical review praised their "flawless ensemble playing", "breakneck virtuosity", and "profound understanding of the complex harmonies and rhythms which underlie klezmer music." The band created dynamic variations on traditional klezmer melodies through collective improvisation, making each performance unique, and deployed instruments in unusual combinations to create the textures of a much larger orchestra. The Klezmorim's instrumental pyrotechnics inspired one French reviewer to call the band "a kind of hurricane, a dizzying maze of notes". A UK music critic remarked, "They must surely play more notes per minute than any other band, making rock 'n' roll appear positively snail-like in comparison."

== Personnel and instruments ==
Early performances of The Klezmorim featured as few as four and as many as nine musicians playing a mix of band and orchestral instruments, plus Eastern European folk instruments such as the gadulka, laouto, tupan, contrabass balalaika, and tsimbalom. By 1979 the band had coalesced into a sextet featuring clarinet, saxophone, trumpet, trombone, tuba, and drums – with members sometimes doubling on additional instruments like xylophone, banjo, Marxophone, or baritone horn, and occasional guest artists adding piccolo, piano, or violin. The sextet lineup—not unlike a traditional New Orleans jazz combo—remained the band's template for the rest of its career.

In the span of an estimated twelve hundred performances, The Klezmorim experienced substantial turnover of personnel; this musical evolution gave a distinct character to each of the band's record albums. About 30 musicians are believed to have been official members of the band at one time or another. Sitting in on various gigs, broadcasts, or recording sessions were another two dozen players, including violinists Miamon Miller and Sandra Layman, Bob Cohen of Di Naye Kapelye, clarinetist Marcelo Moguilevsky, and Terry Zwigoff and Robert Crumb of the Cheap Suit Serenaders.

For over a decade The Klezmorim's core sound and repertoire was defined by a collaborative quartet of players: reedmen Liberman and Gray, trombonist Kevin Linscott, and tuba player Donald Thornton. Other members also influenced the band's direction. Multi-instrumentalists David Skuse and Stuart Brotman set high standards of klezmer authenticity; Brotman produced The Klezmorim's Grammy-nominated album Metropolis. New Orleans one-man band Rick "Professor Gizmo" Elmore and trumpeter Brian "Hairy James" Wishnefsky introduced streetwise theatrics early in The Klezmorim's career. Drummer Tom Stamper and trumpeter Stephen Saxon contributed solid jazz musicianship. Clarinetist Ben Goldberg and percussionist Kenny Wollesen shared a postmodern avant-garde eclecticism (which they subsequently developed further in the New Klezmer Trio).

After the last of the original founding members moved on in 1988, Thornton continued to tour as The Klezmorim with leading players of the klezmer revival until 1993. In 2004, co-founder Liberman resumed leadership of The Klezmorim and performed in Europe with a crew composed of band alumni Brotman, Thornton, and Charlie Seavey, plus new member Mike van Liew and guest clarinetist Yankl Falk (of Hungarian roots-klezmer band Di Naye Kapelye). Co-founder Skuse died of brain cancer in 2010, months after a final reunion jam with Liberman. Although the band remains on indefinite hiatus, bootleg recordings and rumors of new releases continue to circulate.

Listed here are members of The Klezmorim, roughly in chronological order of joining:

- Lev Liberman (alto saxophone, soprano saxophone, C-melody saxophone, taragot, flute, frula, tin whistle, Marxophone, percussion, vocals)
- David Skuse (violin, accordion, mandolin, gadulka, clarinet, vocals)
- David Julian Gray (B-flat clarinet, E-flat sopranino clarinet, mandolin, violin, laouto, mandocello, banjo, banjolin, bugarija, piano, percussion, harmonicas, electric guitar, alto saxophone, vocals)
- Gregory Carageorge (bass, contrabass balalaika)
- Laurie Chastain (violin, mandolin, tambourine, vocals)
- Rick Elmore (trombone, tuba, percussion)
- Nada Lewis (tsambal mik, accordion, bouzouki, tupan)
- Brian Wishnefsky (trumpet)
- Lew Hanson (C-melody saxophone, tenor saxophone, clarinet, accordion)
- Stuart Brotman (bass, tuba, peckhorn, tsimbalom, baraban, baritone horn, tilinca)
- Kevin Linscott (trombone, vocals)
- Suzy Rothfield (violin)
- Miriam Dvorin (violin, vocals)
- John Raskin (drums, xylophone)
- Donald Thornton (tuba, piano)
- Tom Stamper (drums)
- Stephen Saxon (trumpet, flugelhorn, piano)
- Christopher Leaf (trumpet, vocals)
- Ken Bergmann (drums)
- Ben Goldberg (clarinet)
- Kenny Wollesen (drums, percussion)
- Sheldon Brown (clarinet, saxophones)
- Andrew Marchetti (percussion)
- Charlie Seavey (trombone)
- Paul Hanson (clarinet, bassoon)
- Mara Fox (trombone)
- Al Bent (trombone)
- David Barrows (saxophones)
- Dennis Cooper (percussion)
- Mike van Liew (trumpet, piano, baritone horn, baraban)

== Discography ==
- East Side Wedding (Arhoolie LP 3006)

Recorded 1976–77, released 1977.

- Streets of Gold (Arhoolie LP 3011)

Recorded and released 1978.

- First Recordings 1976–78 (Arhoolie CD 309)

Anthology of tracks from East Side Wedding and Streets of Gold. Recorded 1976–78, released 1989.

- Metropolis (Flying Fish LP FF 258; CD FF 70258)

Recorded and released 1981.

- Notes From Underground (Flying Fish LP FF 322)

Recorded and released 1984. Released 1986 in Europe as The Klezmorim (Le Chant du Monde LDX 74854).

- Jazz-Babies of the Ukraine (Flying Fish LP FF 465; CD FF 70465)

Recorded 1986, released 1987. Released as LP 1987 in Europe (Le Chant du Monde LDX 74867).

- Variety Stomp (MW CD 4020)

Recorded 1990, limited cassette release in U.S. Released as CD 1999 in Europe.
