= Zimro Ensemble =

Russian-Jewish musical ensemble (1918-1921)

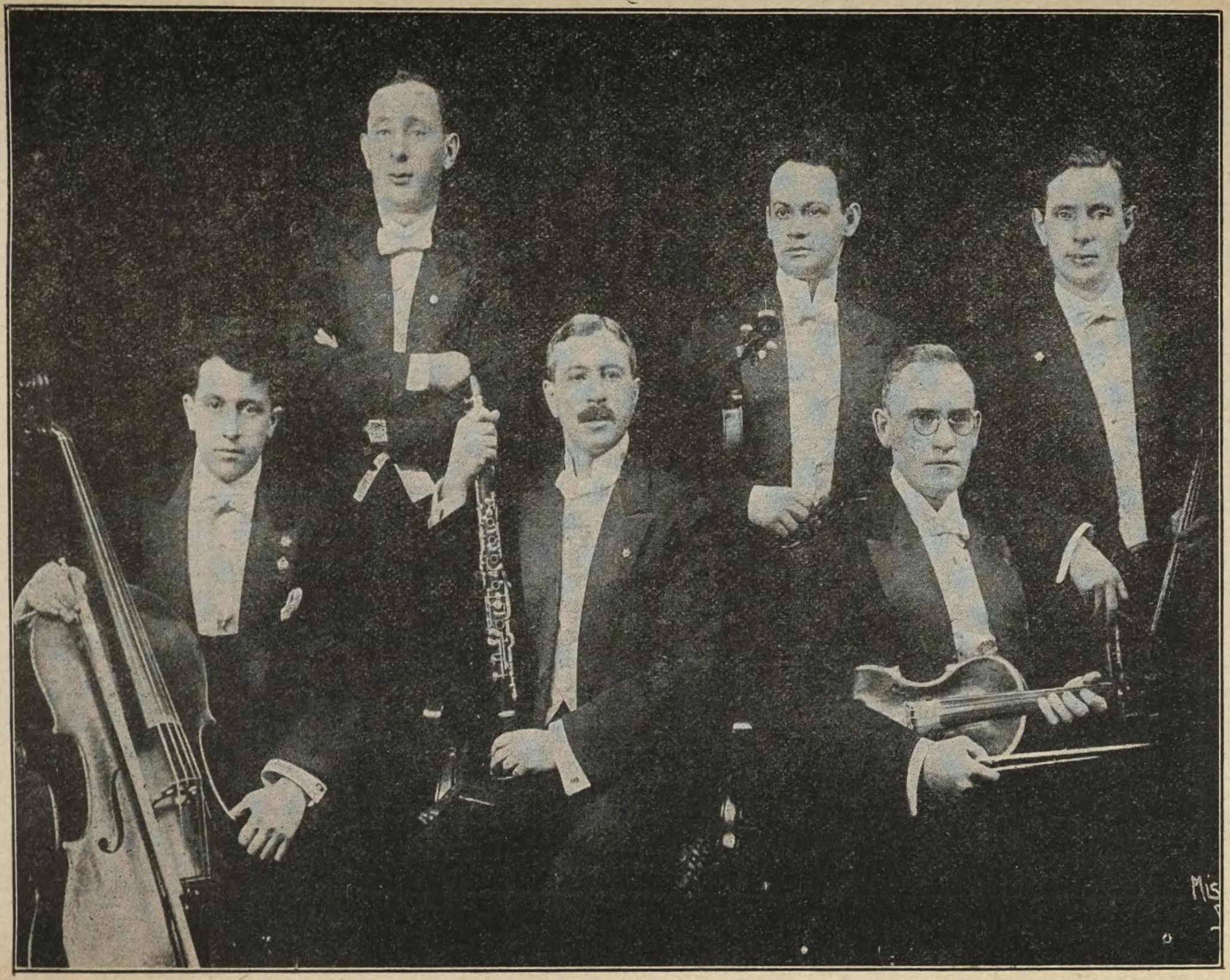
Zimro Sextette, circa 1919

The Zimro Ensemble was an early Soviet musical ensemble founded by clarinetist Simeon Bellison in 1918 which toured Asia and America before dissolving in 1921. It is largely remembered today for the fact that Sergei Prokofiev wrote his Overture on Hebrew Themes to be performed with them.

== History ==
The Zimro Ensemble was founded in Petrograd in January 1918 with the support of the Society for Jewish Folk Music. Simeon Bellison, a clarinetist, had already organized previous Jewish chamber ensembles in the 1910s. With the Zimro Ensemble, he added a piano to the string quartet and clarinet configuration of his previous group. The lead violinist was Jacob Mestechkin, a student of Leopold Auer. The ensemble's goal was to embark on tours of Eastern Russia, Asia, and the United States, with their final goal being Palestine. Their repertoire consisted not only of standard Western chamber repertoire, but also compositions by Russian Jewish composers such as Alexander Krein, Solomon Rosowsky, Joseph Achron, and Mikhail Gnessin.

The Zimro Ensemble left Petrograd in March 1918, passing through the Ural Mountains into the East. They toured Eastern Russia, China, and the Dutch East Indies, finally ending up in the United States in August 1919. The ensemble stayed at least two years in the United States, performing at the congress of the American Zionist Federation in September 1919 and later at Carnegie Hall and various other venues. Sergei Prokofiev composed his Overture on Hebrew Themes for the Zimro Ensemble, who debuted it in February 1920 in New York, with Prokofiev as guest pianist. However, rather than continue with their stated goal of fundraising for an artistic centre in Mandate Palestine, gradually the group broke apart, and at least three of its members (Joseph Cherniavsky, Mestechkin and Bellison) settled in the US and started music careers there.
