= George Roland =

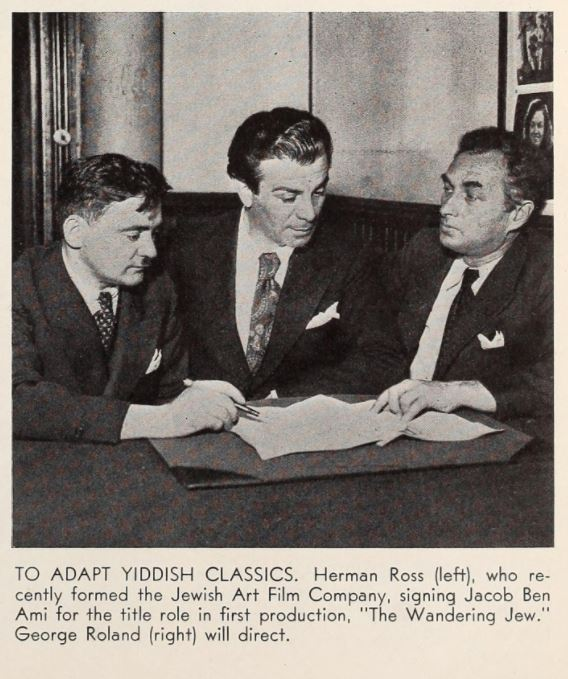
Herman Ross, Jacob Ben-Ami, and George Roland signing a contract to film "The Wandering Jew" 1933

George Roland (1881-1961) was a Yiddish language film director and editor of the 1930s.

== Biography ==
=== Early life ===
George was born in the Russian Empire on June 30, 1881. His exact birthplace, education or early life are poorly documented. Earlier in his life he sometimes went by the name George Kohn Roland or George Rolands.

=== Film career ===
According to various government documents, George was already working as a director in the film industry during the First World War. However, there is little documentation of what he was directing until the early 1930s.

Roland used innovative techniques of re-cutting and re-editing existing films for many of his 1930s works. His first film, 1932's Joseph in the Land of Egypt, was created by careful re-editing of a 1914 Italian film Joseph in Egypt, with a new beginning and ending filmed by Roland. He followed the film with another re-cut work, Yidishe Tokhter, which involved new narration and scenes filmed around a 1921 German film, Judith Trachtenberg. And then, in 1933's Avrom Ovino (Abraham our Patriarch AKA The Wandering Jew), he cut together various short Bible films with new narrations and scenes set in Nazi Germany, and then re-edited a 1924 Polish film Tkies Kaf by Zygmunt Turkow and released it as Dem Rebins Koyekh and A Vilna Legend. Despite the derivative nature of these films, The Wandering Jew in particular received positive coverage and praise for the quality of Jacob Ben-Ami's acting.

In 1936, Yiddish film pioneer Joseph Seiden hired Roland to join him to create a new round of films. Their first collaboration was Libe un Laydnshaft (Love and Passion or Love and Sacrifice).

However, it is unclear how long their collaboration lasted or how many more films Roland directed. In the 1940 census he listed his occupation as film editor.

Roland died in 1961.

Since his death, some of his films have been restored and re-released by the National Center for Jewish Film, including The Wandering Jew in 1999, A Vilna Legend in 1980 and again in 2002, and Love and Sacrifice in 2000.

== Filmography ==
- Joseph in the Land of Egypt (in English, 1932), with music by Israel J. Hochman
- Yidishe Tokhter (Jewish Daughter) (in Yiddish, 1933)
- Avrom Ovino (also released as The Wandering Jew and The Eternal Jew) (in Yiddish, 1933), starring Leibele Waldman
- Dem Rebins Koyekh AKA A Vilna Legend (in Yiddish, 1933)
- Liebe und Liegemshaft (Love and Sacrifice) (in Yiddish, 1936), starring Leibele Waldman, with music by Abe Schwartz
- Ikh vil zayn a Pansyoner (I want to be a Boarder) (short in Yiddish, 1936)
- Ikh vil zayn a Mame (I want to be a mother) (short in Yiddish, 1936)
- The Dybbuk (1938, in Yiddish) as editor, directed by Michael Waszynski
