= Overture on Hebrew Themes =

Chamber work by Sergei Prokofiev

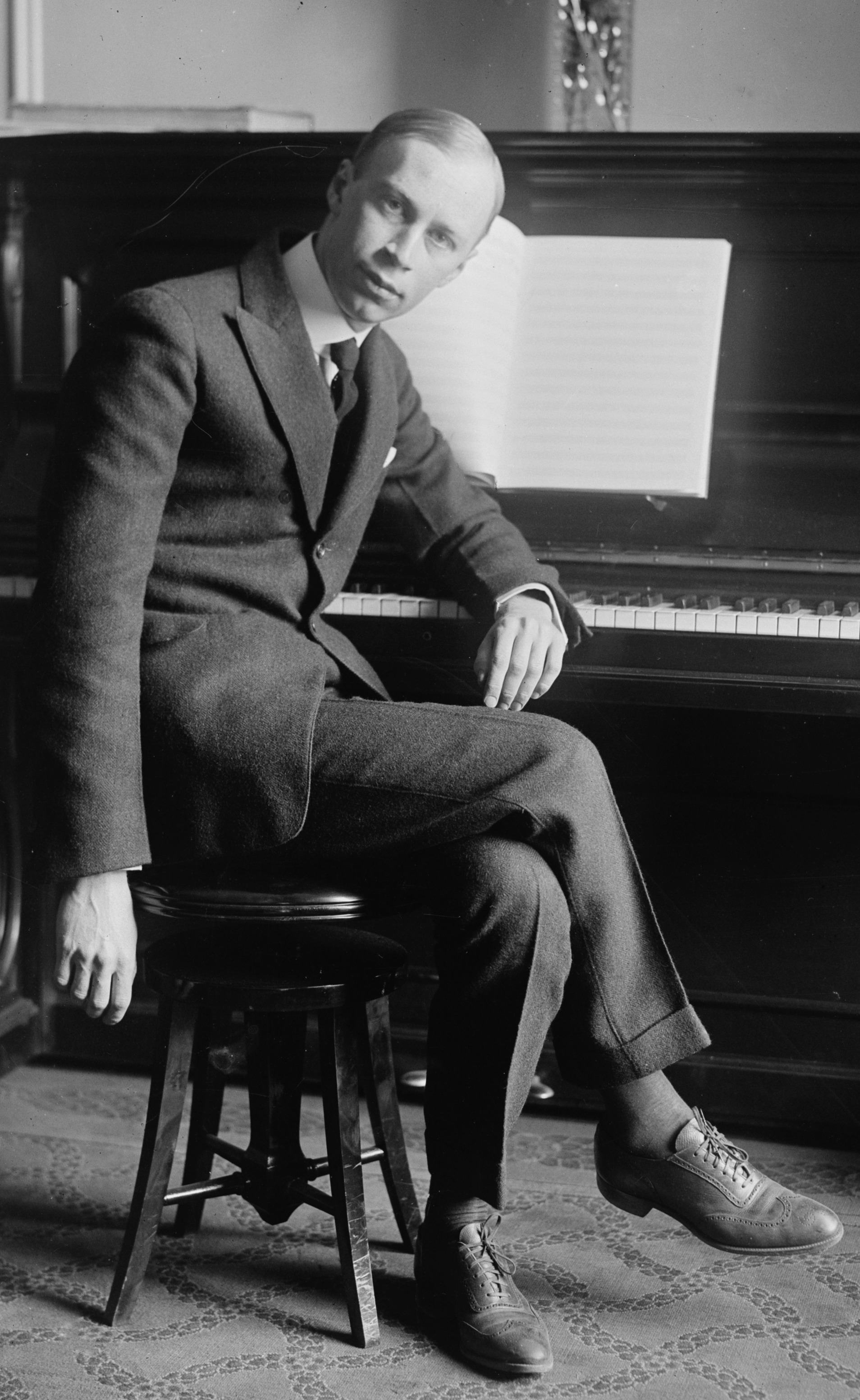
Sergei Prokofiev c. 1918

Sergei Prokofiev wrote the Overture on Hebrew Themes, Op. 34, in 1919 while he was in the United States. It is scored for the rare combination of clarinet, string quartet and piano. Fifteen years later the composer prepared a version for chamber orchestra, his “Op. 34 bis” or Op. 34a, retaining a separate part for piano but featuring solo cello as much as solo clarinet.

Until recently the chamber orchestra version had been the better known, being easily programmable by orchestras, while the original version (for six instruments) requires out-of-the-way planning on the part of a string quartet. But two recordings have drawn attention to the original: Michel Portal clarinet, Parrenin Quartet, Michel Béroff piano (1974); and Giora Feidman clarinet, Juilliard String Quartet, Yefim Bronfman piano (1994).

== Background ==
Prokofiev arrived in New York in September 1918. Early in 1919, he was commissioned by a Russian sextet called the Zimro Ensemble, which had just arrived in America from the Far East on a world tour sponsored by the Russian Zionist Organization. The members played the instruments in this work's instrumentation, and were led by their clarinetist Simeon Bellison, who was trained in Moscow and had been principal clarinettist of the Mariinsky Theatre from 1915. (Bellison would soon become principal clarinet with the New York Philharmonic Symphony Orchestra.) They gave Prokofiev a notebook of Jewish folksongs, though the melodies Prokofiev chose have never been traced to any authentic sources. It has been suggested that Bellison had actually composed them himself in the Jewish style (Nice 2003, 161). The other members of the ensemble were Jacob Mestechkin, first violin, G. Besrody, second violin, K. Moldavan, viola, Joseph Cherniavsky, cello, and Leo Berdichevsky, piano (Levin 2006, 77), although one source names the second violinist as Michael Rosenker, who was 19 years old at the time (Heiles 2007, 286).

It received its premiere at the Bohemian Club in New York, on 2 February 1920, with Prokofiev as guest pianist. Before they disbanded in 1922, the Zimro Ensemble performed it again at least twice at Carnegie Hall—with their own pianist, Berdichevsky, in 1921, and possibly with guest pianist Lara Cherniavsky in December 1920 (Levin 2006, 84). Prokofiev regarded the work as conceived essentially for a sextet, and long resisted suggestions of arranging it for other forces. In September 1930, he remarked, "I don’t understand what sort of obtuse people could have found it necessary to reorchestrate it" but, nevertheless, he was persuaded to make a version for chamber orchestra in 1934, published as Op. 34a (Prokofiev 1998, 168). The orchestrated version is performed less often, because it lacks the earthiness and uncanny timbral balance of the original (Keller 2011, 367).

Prokofiev did not regard the work very highly. When a Scots critic, Andrew Fraser, published an article in 1929 describing the Overture as "a beautiful and pathetic work", the composer wrote in response, "its technique is conventional, its form is bad (4 + 4 + 4 + 4)". When his friend Nikolai Myaskovsky praised the second theme, Prokofiev retorted, with reference to the work's coda, "from the musical point of view, the only worthwhile part, if you please, is the final section, and that, I think, is probably the result of my sweetness and diatonicism" (Nice 2003, 163).

== Analysis ==
Overture on Hebrew Themes
Performed by members of the Advent Chamber Orchestra

Its structure follows the form of a fairly conventional sonata form. It is in the key of C minor. The clarinet and the cello are prominent, introducing the first and second themes respectively. However, all instruments are balanced well, and each instrument plays both themes, often in imitation. Zimro's pianist, Leo Berdichevsky, was a graduate of the Petrograd and Berlin conservatories (Levin 2006, 77).

The first theme, Un poco allegro, has a jumpy and festive rhythm, unmistakably evoking klezmer music by alternating low and high registers and using "hairpin" dynamics. The second theme, Più mosso, is a nostalgic cantabile theme introduced in the cello and then passed to the first violin (Nice 2003, 161).
