= Abraham Moskowitz =

Early 20th century Yiddish actor, klezmer singer and recording artist

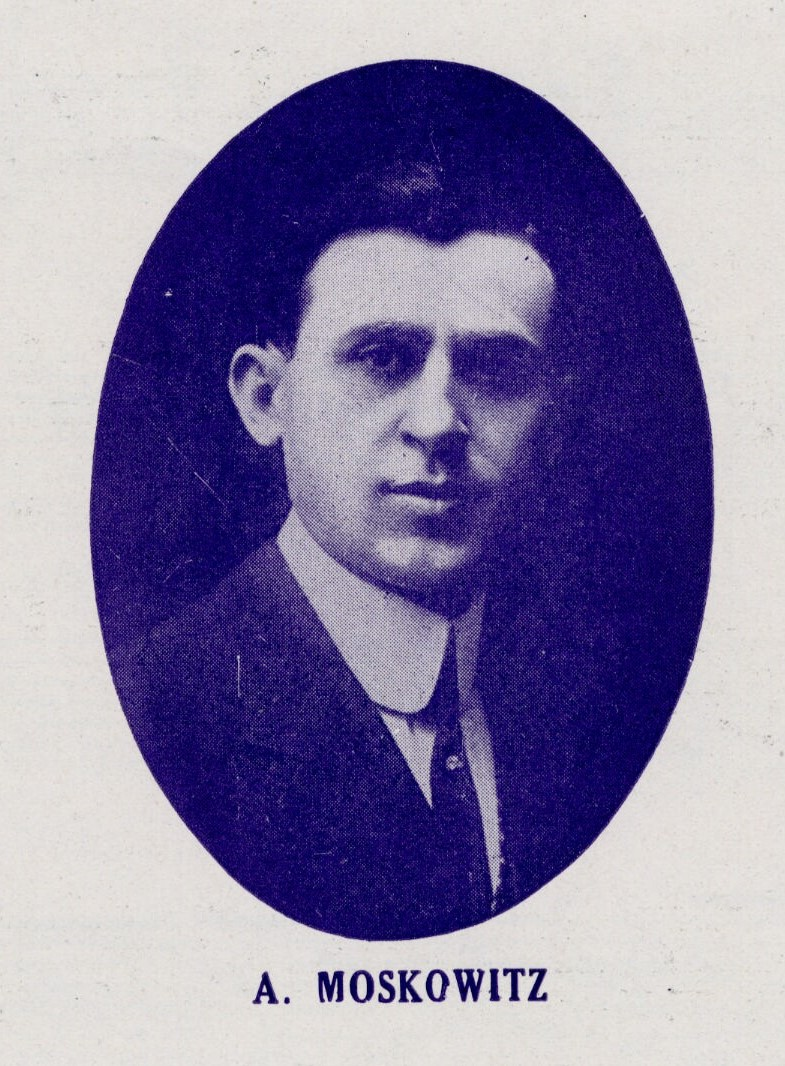
Abraham Moskowitz, Jewish American tenor

Abraham Moskowitz (Yiddish: אברהם מאָסקאָװיץ, born c. 1880 in Slobozia, Ialomița County, Romania, died 1956 in New York City) was a Yiddish language baritone and tenor, Yiddish theater actor and recording artist of the early twentieth century who recorded mainly between 1917 and 1927. His most successful recordings were made in collaboration with the klezmer bandleader and composer Abe Schwartz.

== Biography ==
=== Early life and family ===
Little has been written about Moskowitz's early life, although he was apparently born outside of Bucharest, Romania around 1880. The exact date is unclear; on his First World War draft registration card he stated he was born on May 15, 1878, but based on the age he gave in different census years, he could also have been born between 1880 and 1885. His father was born in Romania but that his mother was born in Russia.

Although some sources states that he emigrated to the United States in 1913, in census and immigration documents he gave various years including 1905 and 1906 He married his wife Sadie (née Raden), a Russian Jewish immigrant, in around 1910. They had two children: Rebecca (Bettie), born around 1913, and Nathan, born around 1918.

=== Music career ===
Abraham worked as a tailor, and that is the occupation he gave on the US censuses during his entire life. However, he was also a talented Yiddish language singer and became involved in the booming "ethnic" recording industry in the 1910s. After spending time working at some smaller labels, he signed to Columbia Records as a recording artist. His collaboration with fellow Columbia artist Abe Schwartz saw their first success in 1919, when he recorded Schwartz's Dos Zekele mit Koilen. In 1922 Moskowitz was one of the first to record the hit Yiddish song Di Grine Kuzine, another piece Schwartz had written or at least copyrighted; other recordings of the song were soon made by Joseph Feldman, Morris Goldstein and others. Moskowitz continued to record Yiddish folk and comic songs for Columbia, and to a lesser degree Pathé Records and Okeh Records, in the early 1920s. After that, his pace of recording slowed and essentially ended by the late 1920s. In 1927, he did record with a fellow Romanian Jewish immigrant, the cymbalist Joseph Moskowitz, in what may be the only recording from that era of a Yiddish singer accompanied by a concert cimbalom. During his recording career he is estimated to have recorded roughly 44 sides; these are now archived at YIVO in New York.

Moskowitz died on February 14, 1956, in New York City.

In the 1990s and 2000s, there was some renewed interest in Moskowitz's recordings, and they started to appear on a number of reissue CDs, such as Yiddish : New York-Paris-Varsovie 1910-1940 (1994), From Avenue A to the Great White Way (2002) and Cantors, klezmorim, and crooners, 1905-1953 : classic Yiddish 78s from the Mayrent Collection (2009).

== Selected discography ==
- Der tag was geht avek/Die heimath (Columbia 1917)
- Oi, die meidelach/Der reisender (Columbia 1921)
- Dos Zekele Koilen/S'is nit dos (Columbia 1921)
- Di Grine Kuzine/Nit di hagada, nor di kneidlach (Columbia 1922, with Abe Schwartz)
- Yashke fuhrt avek/Mameniu Liubeniu (Columbia 1922, with Abe Schwartz)
- Dos frehliche liedele/Mein thaiere Kishinev (Columbia 1923, with Abe Schwartz)
- Vie iz dos gessele/Huliet Huliet kinderlach (Columbia 1927, with Joseph Moskowitz).
