= Musiker =

- Lee Musiker, American jazz musician
- Sam Musiker, American jazz and Klezmer musician
- Raffi Musiker, a Star Trek character
