= Abe Elenkrig =

Klezmer bandleader and cornet player

Abraham "Abe" Elenkrig
- אברהם עלענקריג
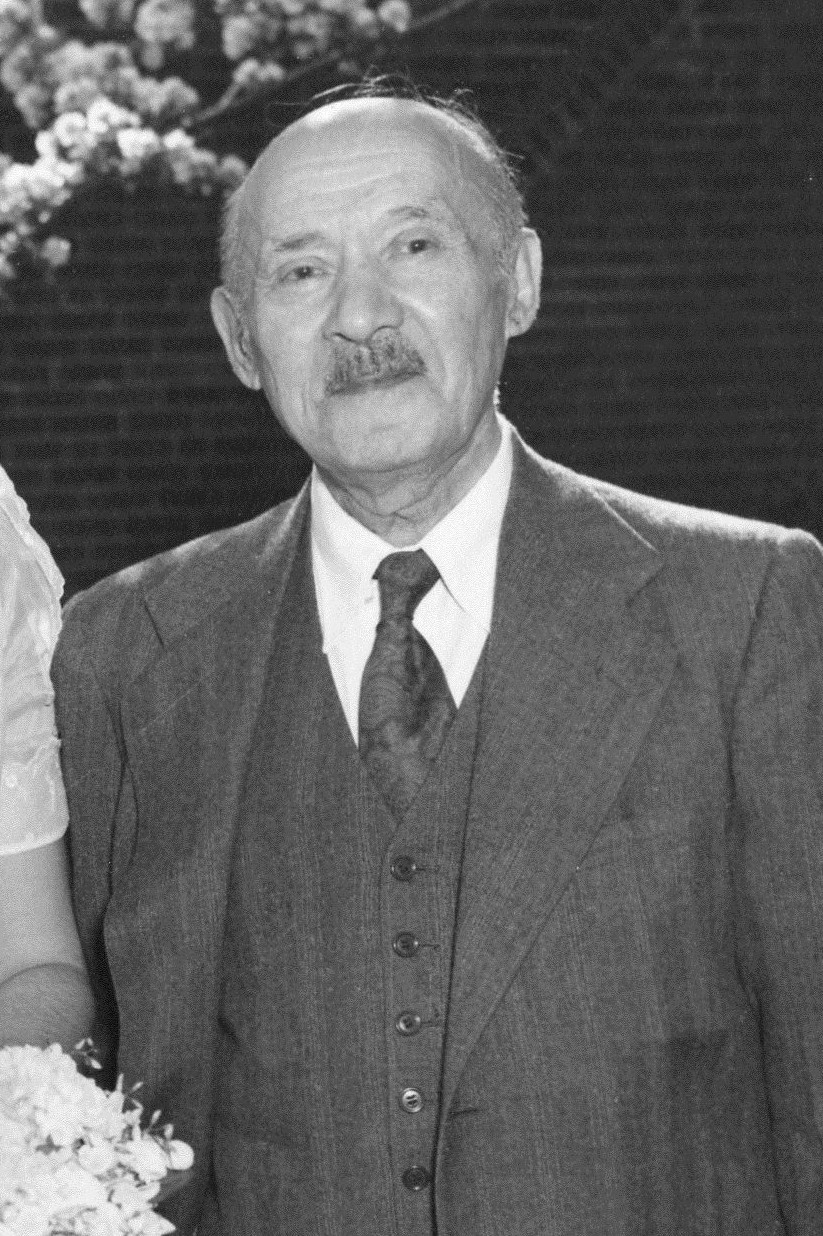
- Abe Elenkrig at a family wedding, c.1950
- Born: September 15, 1878; Zolotonosha, Kiev Governorate, Russian Empire
- Died: January 8, 1965 (aged 86); New York City, United States
- Occupations: Bandleader, cornetist, barber, recording artist
- Known for: Early klezmer recordings in the United States (1913–1915)
- Notable work: Fon der Choope (1913)
- Spouse: Tamara Elenkrig
- Children: Max Elenkrig (and others)

Abraham "Abe" Elenkrig (Yiddish: אברהם עלענקריג, September 15, 1878 – January 8, 1965) was a Russian-born American klezmer bandleader, Cornet player, barber and recording artist of the early twentieth century. He was among the earliest bandleaders to record klezmer music in the United States, making a series of discs for Victor Recording Company and Columbia Records from 1913 to 1915. In 2009, the Library of Congress named his 1913 recording Fon der Choope (From the Wedding) to the National Recording Registry.

== Biography ==
=== Early life ===
Elenkrig was born in Zolotonosha, Kiev Governorate, Russian Empire on September 15, 1878 (although some sources say 1877). He descended from a klezmer family of professional Jewish musicians, and it seems that other musicians from his family emigrated to New York and Philadelphia at around the same time. His father, Joseph Elenkrieg, was the head of the family orchestra in Europe and later emigrated to the United States as well. Abe married his wife Tamara while still living in Russia; their first son Max was born there. Abe apparently emigrated to the United States in 1904 or possibly 1906, sailing from Bremen to New York City. If he did leave in 1906 it may have been a result of the October 1905 Pogrom in Zolotonosha which seriously devastated the Jewish population there.

=== Career ===
For most of his career, Elenkrig seems to have supported himself by working as a barber. However, today he is remembered especially for his pioneering klezmer music recordings made for Victor Recording Company and Columbia Records starting in 1913. Although he was a contemporary of other Ukrainian-born klezmer recording artists of the era, including Joseph Frankel, Israel J. Hochman and Joseph Cherniavsky, his recordings predates theirs by a handful of years, and are therefore the earliest large ensemble klezmer recordings made in the United States.

Klezmer researcher Hankus Netsky notes that Columbia Records had been releasing other forms of Jewish music since 1902, and in the early 1910s had invested much more heavily in "ethnic" music and foreign-made recordings, and that Jewish dance music records aimed at the large immigrant population was a logical next step. During that era Anton Heindl was in charge of Columbia's "foreign department", often recording abroad, although occasionally with artists such as Elenkrig in the New York area. During 1913, Elenkrig recorded around ten klezmer tracks under the name Elenkrig's Orchestra, which had a brassy and recognizably American sound. With the outbreak of the First World War in 1914, Heindl was forced to turn almost exclusively to talent living in the United States. However, Elenkrig does not seem to have profited from that change as he never recorded with Columbia after 1913. He moved to Victor Records in 1915 and teamed up with Meyer Kanewsky, a Cantor, singer and conductor who was also from Zolotonasha. Together, they recorded a number of Jewish, Ukrainian, and Russian pieces in 1915, including another round of about 10 brassy klezmer recordings.

After 1915, Elenkrig did not record under his own name again, and possibly stopped working as a professional musician in general. Some recordings from 1916 to 1917 released under generic labels as "Jewish" or "Romanian" orchestras are thought to be Elenkrig. Klezmer researcher Joel Rubin states that Elenkrig does not seem to have been a leading or prominent figure in the New York klezmer world, and was not remembered by people he interviewed about that time.

Elenkrig died in New York City on January 8, 1965 at the age of 87. He was buried in the Mount Carmel Cemetery in the section set aside by the "Zolotonosher Friends" Landsmanshaft.

== Legacy ==
Although his recording career was short, renewed attention was given to Elenkrig's output in the late 1970s during the Klezmer revival. Recordings of his made it onto a number of klezmer reissue albums, including Klezmer music (1910-1927): early Yiddish instrumental music (Folklyric, 1983), Klezmer music 1910-1942: recordings from the YIVO Archives (Global Village, 1986), Klezmer pioneers: European and American recordings, 1905-1952 (Rounder Records, 1993), Klezmer!: Jewish music from old world to our world (Yazoo, 2000), and Cantors, klezmorim, and crooners, 1905-1953 : classic Yiddish 78s from the Mayrent Collection (JSP, 2009).

To recognize his historical importance as a representative of early Jewish-American music, in 2009, the Library of Congress named his 1913 recording Fon der Choope (From the Wedding) to the National Recording Registry.
