= Klezmorim =

Klezmorim can refer to:

- Musicians who play klezmer, a style of music originating with the Ashkenazi Jews of Central and Eastern Europe
- The Klezmorim, a klezmer band
