= Abe Katzman =

American klezmer recording artist

Abe Katzman אברהם קאצמאן
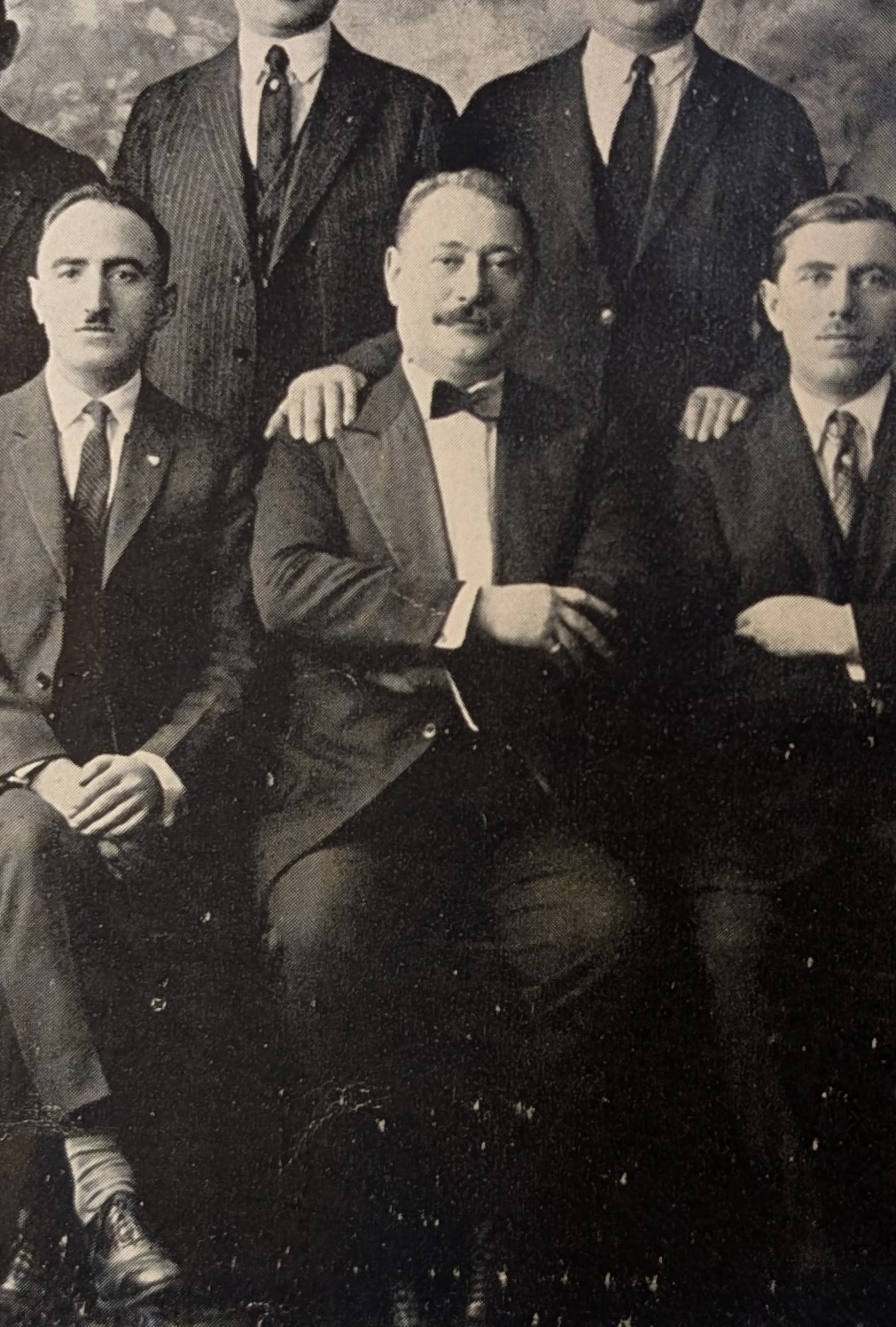

Background information
- Born: 1868; Kishinev, Bessarabia Governorate, Russian Empire
- Origin: Brooklyn, New York, US
- Died: 1940 (aged 71–72)
- Genre: Klezmer
- Occupations: Musician and recording artist
- Instrument: Violin

Abraham Katzman (1868–1940, Yiddish: אברהם קאצמאן) was an American Klezmer violinist, bandleader, composer, and Brunswick Records recording artist of the 1920s. He was the father of film producer Sam Katzman, uncle of American arranger and bandleader Louis Katzman and the great-uncle of Henry Katzman and Leonard Katzman.

== Biography ==
=== Early life ===
Abe was born Abram-Aba Katsman in 1868 in Chișinău (then known as Kishinev), Bessarabia Governorate, Russian Empire. His father was Chaim Katzman and his mother was named Sura Bayla (née Goldman). He was from a musical family; his brother Philip Katzman played in opera orchestras in Moscow and Chișinău. He later stated that he had studied violin in Russia under a Professor Gilla. Abe emigrated to New York City in October 1897.

=== Music career ===
In his early years, he worked as a violin teacher and lived in Manhattan. In 1903, following the Kishinev pogrom, he cofounded the Kishinever Sick Benevolent Society, a Landsmanshaft for fellow immigrants from Chișinău. He acted as its first president. By 1910, he was also apparently bandleader of a klezmer orchestra in Brooklyn, making him a contemporary of New York klezmer musicians from Romania and Bessarabia such as Max Leibowitz, Abe Schwartz, and Joseph Moskowitz, as well as Milu Lemisch in Philadelphia. Irving Gratz, who would later become the regular drummer for Dave Tarras, got his start in Abe's band; Tarras himself also played in the band for a time.

In the early 1920s he was advertising his services as a violinist and conductor of A. Katzman's Orchestra. It was in December 1927 that he entered the Brunswick Records studio in New York to record the sides of klezmer dance and performance music for which he is remembered today, under the band name Abe Katzman's Bessarabian Orchestra. It seems probable that he was brought in to make the recordings because his nephew Louis Katzman was a well-known Brunswick Records recording artist and bandleader. Dave Tarras may have been the clarinetist on these recordings, although he is uncredited.

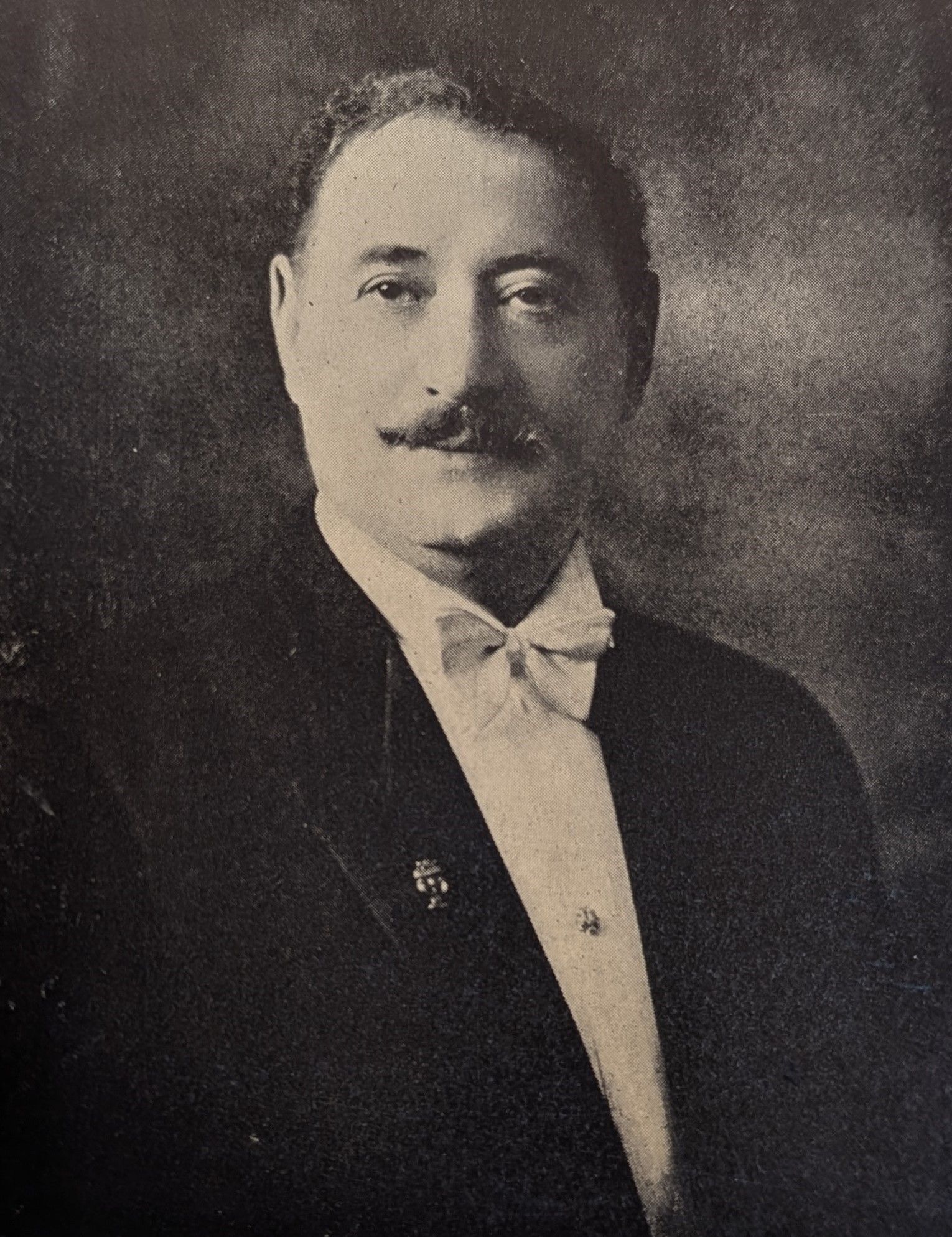
Abe Katzman c.1933

By 1940 Abe was living in Los Angeles, California with his wife, daughters and some other relatives. He died there of a stroke at age 72 at Saint Vincent's Hospital on October 16, 1940. He was buried in Mount Zion Cemetery in Queens in the section of the landsmanshaft he cofounded.

=== Family ===
Abe married his wife Rebecca (Rivke, née Sugarman/Zuckermann), daughter of a businessman from Akkerman, Bessarabia (now Bilhorod-Dnistrovskyi, Ukraine) in 1894 in Chișinău. They had many children: Louis (born 1895 in Chișinău), Lillie (born 1897 in Chișinău), David (born 1899 in New York), Sam Katzman (born 1901), Sophie (born 1902), Ida (born 1904), George (born 1905), and Bessie (born 1908).
