= Naftule Brandwein =

Jewish American musician (1884–1963)

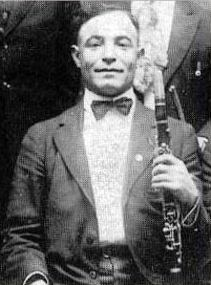

Background information
- Born: 1884; Przemyslany, Austria-Hungary
- Died: 1963 (aged 78–79)
- Genres: Klezmer
- Instrument: Clarinet

Naftule Brandwein, or Naftuli Brandwine, (Yiddish: נפתלי בראַנדװײַן, September 20, 1884 – October 2, 1963) was an Austrian-born Jewish American Klezmer musician, clarinetist, bandleader and recording artist active from the 1910s to the 1940s. Along with Dave Tarras, he is considered to be among the top klezmer musicians of the twentieth century, and has a continuing influence on musicians in the genre a century later. Along with Tarras and other contemporaries like Israel J. Hochman, Max Leibowitz and Harry Kandel, he also helped forge the new American klezmer sound of the early twentieth century, which gradually gravitated towards a sophisticated big-band sound.

== Biography ==
=== Early life ===
Brandwein was born on September 20, 1884, in Przemyslany, Austro-Hungarian Galicia (now Ukraine). He was born into a dynasty of klezmer musicians, part of the Stretiner Hasidic dynasty founded by Rabbi Yehuda Hirsch Brandwein of Stratin. His father Peysekhe (Paul) played violin, clarinet, and was an improvising wedding poet (Badchen); of his thirteen sons, Moyshe played violin, French horn, and valve trombone, Mendel played piano, Leyzer played drums, and Azriel played cornet; Azriel became Naftule's first music teacher, and had a lasting impact on his playing. He married his wife Dora, and they had their first son Moses, shortly before emigrating to America.

Brandwein emigrated to the United States in April 1909 (although some sources say 1908), sailing from Hamburg to New York City. He was joining his brother Israel who was already living on Rivington Street on the Lower East Side; Naftule and his wife and son settled on nearby Pitt Street. He applied for US citizenship in 1912, adopting the Anglicized name Nathan Brandwein, although in his music career he continued to be known as Naftule. He finally became a naturalized US citizen in 1919.

=== Music career ===
Naftule was already a highly skilled clarinetist when he arrived in the US and used his skills of self-promotion to build himself a reputation as a klezmer and bandleader. However, unlike Abe Elenkrig, Max Leibowitz and other klezmers who recorded during World War I, Naftule does not seem to have recorded until around 1920, first playing as an uncredited soloist in Abe Schwartz's band. It was in 1922 that he began recording under his own name at Columbia Records, making a handful of tracks of klezmer dances and virtuosic Doinas, as well as making some Ukrainian music discs under the label Russkyj Narodnyj Orchester. In early 1923, he left Columbia, first making a handfulful of klezmer recordings at Emerson Records before settling in at Columbia's rival label Victor Records. He stayed there for several years, making roughly two dozen recordings from 1923 to 1927, consisting mostly of virtuosic klezmer music put out under the label Naftule Brandwein Orchestra. In 1923, he was sued by the violinist Max Leibowitz for allegedly recording a tune he had copyrighted the year before. The case ended up being dismissed because Leibowitz had still been a Romanian citizen when he had copyrighted the work, which gave him less protection than an American citizen would have had.

His career declined from the mid-1920s onward, as demand for his traditional approach to klezmer music waned; his run of Victor Records sessions ended in 1927. From being the top musician in New York, he was reduced to playing in the Borscht Belt. He finally returned to the Victor Records studio in 1941, recording a handful of klezmer dance pieces under his own label once again. By the 1950s, he had difficulty getting many gigs, because of the changing expectations in the music scene; he could not read sheet music and was not as comfortable with popular American music as some of his contemporaries like Dave Tarras, and especially as compared to the younger generations such as Sam Musiker and Max Epstein. Nonetheless, he continued to work regularly until shortly before his death.

Brandwein died on October 2, 1963, at age 79. He was buried in the Mount Hebron Cemetery in Flushing in the Progressive Musical Benevolent Society section. His yahrtzeit is 14 Tishrei.

== Style ==
Brandwein was known as much for his colorful personality as for his musical talent, sometimes playing with a neon sign around his neck reading "Naftule Brandwein Orchestra," with his back facing the audience to conceal his fingering tricks, or even by pulling down his pants. He also wore plugged-in Christmas lights as part of his costume on several occasions, which once shorted out when he perspired too much, almost electrocuting him. His wild style incorporated the many strands of Eastern European Jewish music which was influenced by Greek, Turkish, Hungarian and Gypsy music. His warm and lively playing style would constantly jump up and down the scale and express itself in trills, slides and other ornamentation; he is often contrasted to the other famous klezmer clarinettist of his time, Dave Tarras, who had a different style of sound and phrasing. Brandwein took risks in his playing, often improvising a wildly different interpretation of a passage with each attempt.

== Legacy ==
While he did not live to witness the resurgence of interest in klezmer that began in the mid-1970s, his legacy has been revived by a new generation of klezmer musicians, who cite him as a key source of inspiration. Among the klezmer revivalists who have been strongly influenced by him are David Krakauer, Hankus Netsky, Alicia Svigals, and Michael Winograd. The intricate traditions of klezmer music are not well preserved in sheet music, and his recordings are one of the main sources people look to for the "original" klezmer style.

== Recordings ==
- 1997: King of the Klezmer Clarinet
