= Meyer Kanewsky =

- מאיר קאנעווסקי
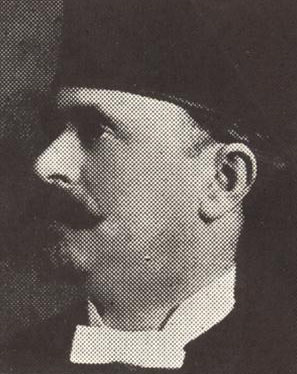
- Born: c. 1880; Zolotonosha, Poltava Governorate, Russian Empire (now Ukraine)
- Died: June 10, 1924; Manhattan, New York, United States
- Occupations: Cantor, lyric tenor, recording artist

Meyer Kanewsky (Yiddish: מאיר קאנעווסקי, c. 1880 – June 10, 1924) was a cantor, lyric tenor, and recording artist of the early twentieth century. Between 1912 and 1918, he performed, arranged or produced more than 130 sides of Cantorial music, Klezmer music, and Yiddish, Ukrainian, and Russian music for Victor Records, Columbia Records and Edison Records.

== Biography ==
=== Early life ===
Kanewsky was born around 1880 in Zolotonosha, Poltava Governorate, Russian Empire (now Ukraine). His exact birthdate is difficult to ascertain, as some sources say 1878, 1880, or 1881. He married his wife Annie (Nunia, née Brass), born in Mykolaiv, in 1903 while still in Russia. They emigrated to New York City around 1905.

=== Music career ===
It is unclear what Kanewsky did for the first few years he lived in the United States, but by 1910 he was performing concerts in New York and being called the "Jewish Caruso" in advertisements. By 1912 he had signed a recording deal with Columbia Records and began to record Cantorial music. He also recorded Yiddish language songs under the pseudonym M. Guttman and Russian and Ukrainian songs under the name M. Mironenko or M. Palamak. As early as 1912 he also worked as a cantor at Congregation Ohab Zedek, although Yossele Rosenblatt was famously the main cantor there during most of the decade.

In the fall of 1915 Kanewsky left Columbia for Victor Records, bringing with him his instrumental collaborator and Klezmer musician Abe Elenkrig. He apparently had a leading role in the direction or arrangement of Elenkrig's Orchestra recordings there. He also continued to record Cantorial, Yiddish and Russian music, mostly under his own name but also sometimes as M. Kanewksy-Katz or M. Palamak. At around this time, he began to perform with his daughter Rose, who would often sing Yiddish Theatre songs as a part of his act.

Towards the end of the decade, Kanewsky's Columbia recordings seem to have continued to be popular, because his name was given top billing on an advertisement aimed at the Jewish market in 1919. His stage career as a singer of light operatic works also continued to develop. In July 1918 he appeared at City College stadium with the orchestra conducted by Arnold Volpe, where he performed Ukrainian and Jewish folksongs as well as Italian opera pieces. In March 1919 he made his debut at Carnegie Hall, where he performed Jewish and Russian songs as well as passages from La Juive and Rigoletto. The concert received positive reviews in the press, with one noting that he had a "naturally beautiful and powerful lyric tenor voice". A follow-up Stadium concert later that year also received positive reviews, noting his "large, robust, sympathetic voice".

In 1919 Kanewsky also involved himself in advocacy for Ukrainian Jews. (This may have been spurred by the two Pogroms that happened in his native Zolotonosha in the spring of 1919.) He spoke at a mass rally in New York where hundreds of delegates of the Federation of Ukrainian Jews were present; their goal was to pressure the US government to allow the Federation to send a fact finding mission there and to reestablish contact with their relatives in the country.

He continued to appear on stage in the early 1920s, giving a stadium concert in July 1920.

Meyer died on June 10, 1924, in Manhattan. He was only in his mid-40s, and so his early death cut short a promising career as a singer. He was buried in the Mount Carmel Cemetery in the section of the "Zolotonosher Friends" Landsmanshaft.

=== Family ===
Annie and Meyer had a number of children: Rose (born in Russia in 1904), William (born in the US in 1905), Morris (born 1907), Regina (born 1908), and Jeanette (born 1909).
