= Joseph Cherniavsky =

Jewish-American composer

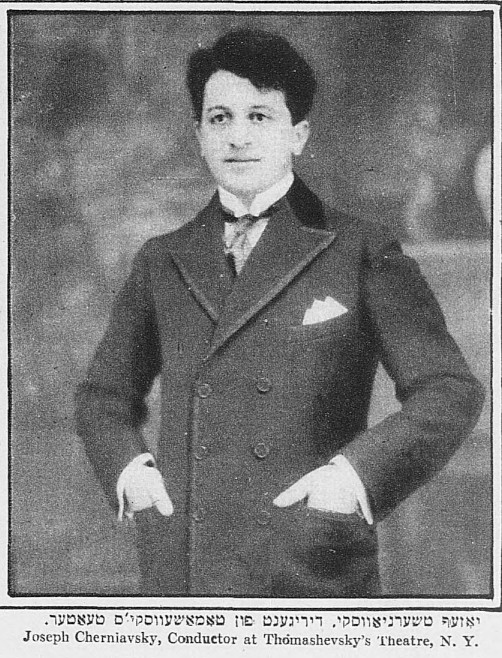
Joseph Cherniavsky, Jewish-American composer

Joseph Cherniavsky (Yiddish: יוסף טשערניאַװסקי, c. 1890-1959) was a Jewish American cellist, theatre and film composer, orchestra director, and recording artist. He wrote for the Yiddish theatre, made some of the earliest novelty recordings mixing American popular music, Jazz and klezmer in the mid-1920s, was also musical director at Universal Studios in 1928-1929, and had a long career in radio and musical theatre.

== Biography ==
=== Early life ===
Josef Leo Cherniavsky was born in Lubny, Poltava Governorate, Russian Empire around 1890. The exact date of his birth is unclear; a citizenship application by his wife in 1928 said March 29, 1889; he himself said on US military documents that it was March 29, 1890, while the Lexicon of Yiddish Theatre says it was March 31, 1894. His father was a klezmer musician, as was his grandfather. Although the Lexicon of Yiddish Theatre claims that his grandfather was the prototype for Sholem Aleichem's fictional klezmer Stempenyu (in real life, a violinist named Yosele Druker), it seems that his grandfather was actually Peysekh Fidelman, father of the violinists Alexander Fiedemann. In his youth, Joseph studied in a Cheder and also played drums in his father's ensemble at weddings. He soon began to learn the cello from his father, and then moved to Odessa where he continued to learn the instrument from his uncle Alexander Fiedemann. He then obtained a government scholarship and traveled to study at the Saint Petersburg Conservatory under such figures as Nicolai Rimsky-Korsakov and Alexander Glazunov. He graduated in 1911 with a gold medal as a Cellist and Conductor and then went to Leipzig where he finished his studies under Julius Klengel.

=== Musical career in Russia ===
While still a music student, Cherniavsky had been a member of a Jewish chamber music ensemble founded by clarinetist Simeon Bellison called the Moscow Quintet, which was heavily influenced by the Society for Jewish Folk Music. Cherniavsky had collected Jewish melodies in villages during that era and contributed them to the development of the ensemble's repertoire. Upon finishing his studies in 1914 he returned to Saint Petersburg and rejoined the ensemble, played in some Russian orchestras, and began to compose. In 1918, with the support of the aforementioned Society, Bellison founded a new chamber ensemble called the Zimro Ensemble, also known as the Palestine Chamber Music Ensemble: ZIMRO. The ensemble added a piano and its lead violinist was Jacob Mestechkin, a student of Leopold Auer. The ensemble's goal was to embark on tours of Eastern Russia, Asia, and the United States, with their final goal being Palestine. Their repertoire consisted not only of standard Western chamber repertoire, but also compositions by Russian Jewish composers such as Alexander Krein, Solomon Rosowsky, Joseph Achron, and Mikhail Gnessin.

The Zimro Ensemble left Petrograd in March 1918, passing through the Ural Mountains into the East. They toured Eastern Russia, China, and the Dutch East Indies, finally ending up in the United States in August 1919. The ensemble stayed at least two years in the United States, performing at the congress of the American Zionist Federation in September 1919 and later at Carnegie Hall and various other venues. Sergei Prokofiev composed his Overture on Hebrew Themes for the Zimro Ensemble, who debuted it in February 1920 in New York, with Prokofiev as guest pianist. However, rather than continue with their stated goal of fundraising for an artistic centre in Mandate Palestine, gradually the group broke apart, and at least three of its members (Cherniavsky, Mestechkin and Bellison) settled in the US and started music careers there.

=== Klezmer, theater and vaudeville in the United States ===
In 1919, while the Zimro ensemble was still playing concerts, Cherniavsky wrote the music for a play called Moishe der Klezmer which was performed by Maurice Schwartz. His encounter with Schwartz led him to enter the world of the Yiddish Theatre more prominently as a composer and arranger. They collaborated on the first American adaption of The Dybbuk which played to great success in 1921–22.

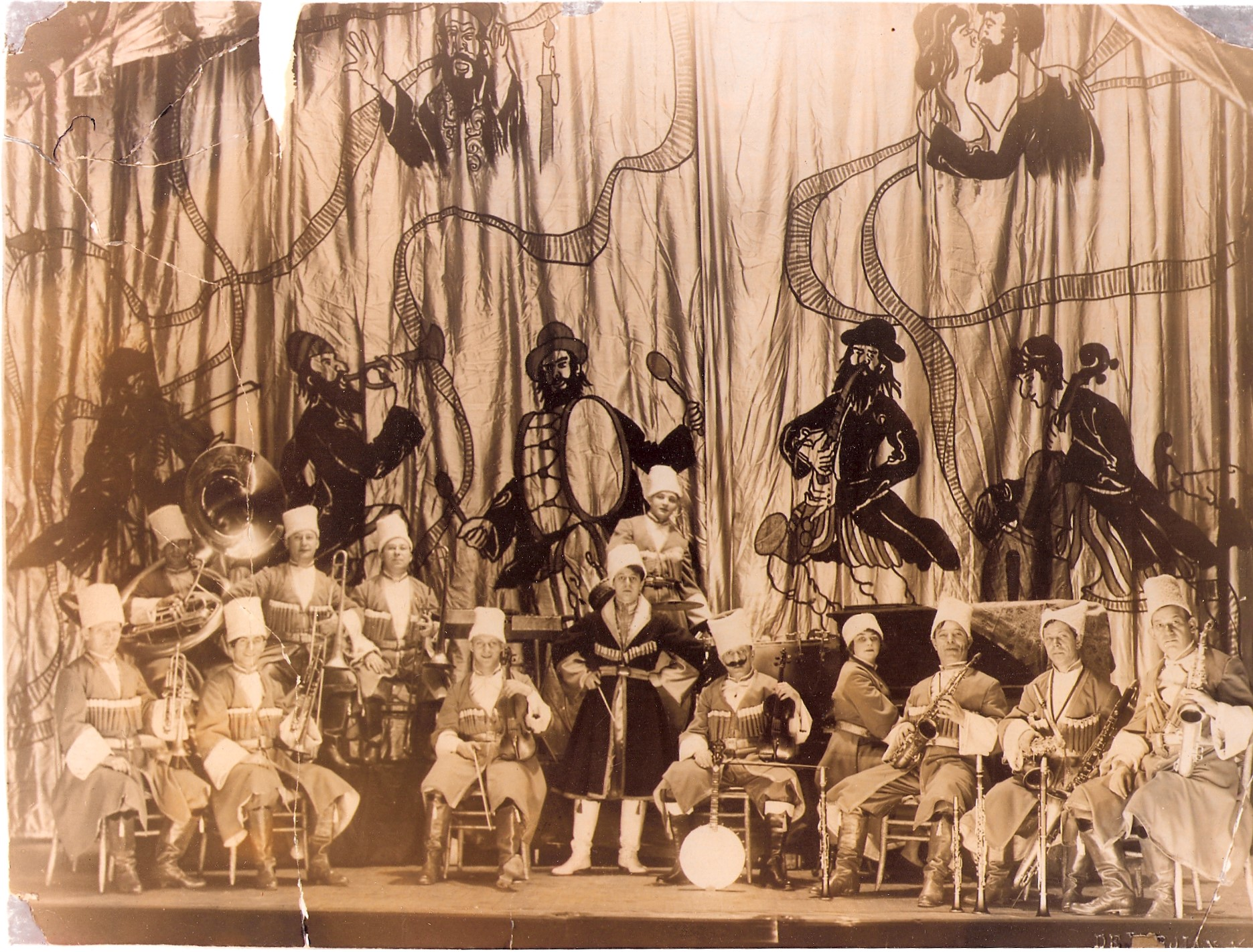
Joseph Cherniavsky and his Chasidic-American Jazz Band, Keith-Orpheum A circuit, c. 1923-1925

After The Dybbuk closed, Cherniavsky rewrote some of the material into a new vaudeville act which he variously called Joseph Cherniavsky's Yiddish-American Jazz Band, the Hasidic-American Jazz Band, etc. The orchestra members would dress as Cossacks or Hasidim. Cherniavsky's wife Lara, a pianist, was also involved in leading rehearsals and possibly coming up with some of the arrangements. Famous klezmers who played in this orchestra included Naftule Brandwein, Dave Tarras and Shloimke Beckerman. The act toured the United States for three years. In 1924 his recordings for Pathé Records as the Cherniavsky Jewish Jazz Band were marketed as the first "Jewish Jazz Band" in the country. Dave Tarras later said that the music had not really been Jazz, but just "nice theatre music". Klezmer researcher Jeffrey Wollock describes the act's music as "neither jazz nor true klezmer, his arrangements were modernistic, theatrical treatments of Jewish content." By 1925 the orchestra disbanded.

Cherniavsky had also continued to compose for the Yiddish Theatre after The Dybbuk. He went to work for Boris Thomashefsky and at various venues including the National Theatre, Irving Place Theatre, and Thomashefsky's Broadway Theatre. One 1922 Thomashefsky production he wrote the music for was called Dance, Song and Wine. In 1926 he was made composer and conductor at the newly opening Public Theatre at Second Avenue and 4th Street. However, his composing for Yiddish music appears to have ended during this period; his last copyrighted piece of this kind appears to be Der kaddish tsu mayn shtam (1925), and the Lexicon of Yiddish Theatre notes that he retired from the theatre after his stay at the Public Theatre in 1926-7.

Cherniavsky was also present in the early years of Yiddish language radio in the United States. He was musical director of what may have been the first regularly scheduled Yiddish music hour at WFBH in 1926. That program, called the Libby Hotel Program, ran from May to August of that year and may have featured Dave Tarras on the clarinet. In late 1927 he once again tried to launch a vaudeville tour, this time under the name Cherniavsky and his Orientals, specializing in "Chassidic and Caucasian music".

=== Mainstream American music career ===
After leaving the Yiddish theatre around 1927, Cherniavsky gravitated towards mainstream English music, whether in radio, film or theatre. In February 1928 he launched a new radio series with Josef Cherniavsky's Colonials Orchestra at the Colony Theatre in New York; they had made their stage debut at the opening of The Chinese Parrot. Later in 1928 Carl Laemmle appointed him musical director at Universal Studios and Cherniavsky relocated to Hollywood. One of the few films he scored during this time was Show Boat (1929). However, he was not there long; he left in July 1929 before his contract was finished.

Cherniavsky spent the 1930s working contracts in various cities in radio, television and theatre. In 1930 he briefly worked in Toronto at the Uptown Theatre. He spent a few years running an orchestra called the Sympho-Syncopators. Then he was musical director of the Chicago Theatre around 1933-35. In 1936 he launched a television series called The Musical Cameraman on NBC. Around 1938, Cherniavsky and his family relocated to Cincinnati. Joseph took up a musical director post at WLW Cincinnati.

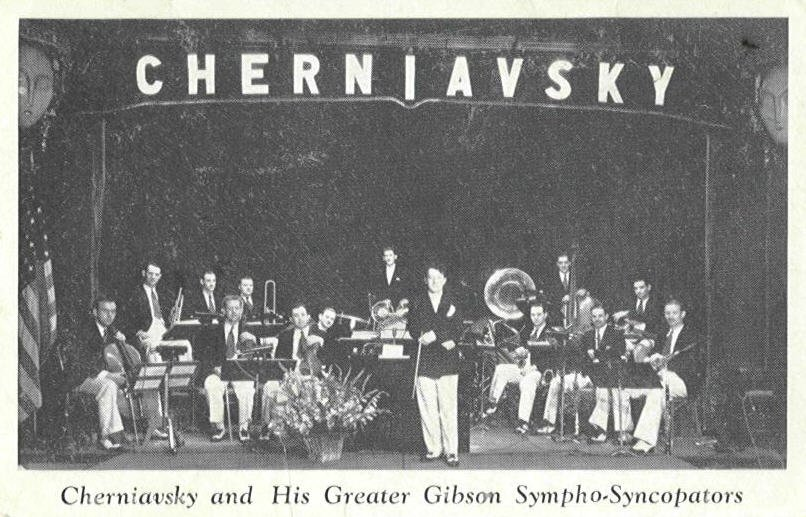
A group photo of Joseph Cherniavsky and His Greater Gibson Sympho-Syncopators (early 1930s).

During the Second World War, he continued to work in radio, leaving WLW Cincinnati for WOV New York in 1941 and then WEII CBS Radio in Boston in 1942. In the early 1940s, he also ran another orchestra called the Boy Meets Girl Orchestra. In 1949 Cherniavsky spent time in Johannesburg, South Africa where he was musical director for a production of Oklahoma! as well as some Ballet productions.

After 1949, he continued in music as the conductor of the Saginaw Civic Symphony from 1951 to 1959.

== Personal life ==
Joseph's wife was a pianist named Lara (née Lieberman) was born in Nikolaev, where they were married in June 1917. Their son William was born in June 1918 in Russia and their daughter Salomea (Sally Fox) was born in California in December 1929. Sally would go on to become a professional photographer and editor of books of art about women's everyday lives in history, while William became a television scriptwriter in Hollywood.

Cherniavsky died on 3 November 1959 in New York City.

== Legacy ==
During the Klezmer revival, which began in the late 1970s, there was renewed interest in the klezmer and Jewish compositions of Cherniavsky's early career. The Klezmorim covered one of his songs on their self-titled 1984 album. A band led by Pete Sokolow in the 1980s called the Original Klezmer Jazz Band incorporated Cherniavsky's material into their repertoire. In 1993, one of his 1920s recordings appeared on the compilation Klezmer Pioneers (European And American Recordings 1905-1952) by Rounder Records, and in the same year on the compilation Mazel Tov: more music of the Jewish people by Intersound, Inc. In 1999 another track of his was reissued on Oytsres Treasures: klezmer music, 1908-1996 by Wergo records.
