= Harry Kandel =

American klezmer bandleader

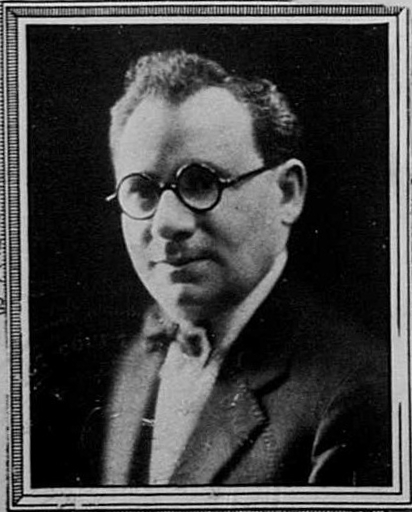
Harry Kandel, 1922 passport photo

Harry Kandel (c. 1885–1943) was an American clarinetist and klezmer bandleader of the early twentieth century. His recording career with the Victor Recording Company lasted from 1916 to 1927, during which he released dozens of Jewish music records.

== Biography ==
=== Early life ===
Harry was born Chaim Kandel (חיים קענדעל) sometime around 1885; on some immigration documents he gave his birthdate as September 21, 1883 or March 28, 1884. Kandel's birthplace is also unclear, as some sources say he was born in Kraków, Galicia whereas others say it was Lviv or just Galicia more generally. In a number of census and immigration documents Kandel listed his birthplace as Russia or more specifically Kovel, Volyn Oblast (now located in Ukraine). His father was named Mordko Kandel. Despite Harry's later career recording klezmer music in the United States, he apparently did not come from a klezmer family, but one involved in the timber trade. He studied clarinet at the Odessa Conservatory and briefly served in a Russian army band before emigrating to New York City in October 1904.

=== Music career ===
Upon arriving in the United States, Kandel became a working musician on the popular Keith Vaudeville Circuit with the Great Lafayette Band, then appeared on Buffalo Bill's Wild West show. He seems to have lived in Philadelphia as early as 1904, although he also apparently lived and worked in New York City at other times. He became a naturalized U.S. citizen in 1912. At some point in the 1910s he became bandleader at the Arch Street Theatre, a vaudeville and Yiddish Theatre venue, where he continued to work at least until 1918. He also became assistant band director in and clarinetist/saxophonist in John Philips Sousa's Pennsylvania State Militia Band. He also played weddings and community functions in Philadelphia.

He formed his own group, Harry Kandel's Famous Inlet Orchestra, in 1916. He also got into business, opening the People's Talking Machine Company on South Street, a store which sold records, sheet music and Piano rolls.

At around the same time he was recruited by the Victor Recording Company to help develop its klezmer music catalog. He became one of the well-known names in the genre alongside his contemporaries Naftule Brandwein, Max Leibowitz and Dave Tarras. According to Philadelphia klezmer researcher Hankus Netsky, his recordings during this era were full of melodies and musicians from that city's klezmer music milieu, including drummer and xylophonist Jacob Hoffman, and was quite distinct from the recordings of the better-known New York bandleaders. He also recorded for Brunswick and Okeh. He recorded roughly 90 sides of Jewish music from 1915 to 1927.

He mostly retired from orchestral work in 1924 to run a music store. He continued performing on occasions, and appeared on the radio. In the 1930s he primarily made his living running electrical appliance stores. In the early '30s he mainly sold radios and by the late '30s was running a store that sold Westinghouse refrigerators. Years later Kandel's wife's obituary remembered him not as a musician but as a "pioneer electrical appliance dealer". He also used his businesses to lend support to Jewish radio; for a time in the 1930s he collaborated with the Kolster Radio Corporation to fund the Kandel-Kolster Hour. That program, which aired on WDAS, presented singers such as Chaim Towber and Moishe Oysher to the city.

He died in Philadelphia in July 1943.

=== Family ===
Kandel married his wife Pauline (née Wool or Voll) in Philadelphia in 1907. She continued to live in Philadelphia after Harry's death and died herself in 1952. Their children were Reba (born 1911), Samuel (born 1913), and Doris (born 1921), all born in Philadelphia.

== Legacy ==
A collection of music manuscripts assembled by Kandel ended up in the archive of the YIVO institute in New York City, and other manuscripts which he had submitted for copyright ended up in the Library of Congress. During the Klezmer Revival of the 1970s and 1980s, there was renewed interest in 78 rpm recordings of klezmer music from the 1910s and 1920s, and some of Kandel's old recordings were reinterpreted or reissued. Some of the reissue albums they appeared on include Jakie jazz 'em up: old-time klezmer music, 1912-1926. (Global Village, 1993), Klezmer pioneers : European and American recordings, 1905-1952. (Rounder Records, 1993), and Klezmer music: early Yiddish instrumental music, 1908-1927. (Arhoolie Records, 1997). In addition, Global Village put out two CDs entirely of reissued Kandel tracks: Russian sher: master of klezmer music (1993) and Master of klezmer music. Volume 2, Der gassen nigun (1997). In 2010 the Judaica Sound Archives at Florida Atlantic University also reissued a number of his tracks in CD form: The Kandel Orchestra. Volume 1: 1917-1918. and The Kandel Orchestra. Volume 2: 1921..
