= Tarasyuk =

Tarasyuk or Tarasiuk is Ukrainian and Polish (spelled as Tarasiuk) surname. It is a patronymic surname derived from the given name Taras. Notable people with this surname include:

- Borys Tarasyuk
- Stanislav Tarasyuk
- Sergey Tarasyuk, high-profile Soviet NKVD functionary

== See also ==
- Dave Tarras, a Ukrainian-American klezmer singer born David Tarasiuk
