= Max Leibowitz =

American violinist, composer and bandleader

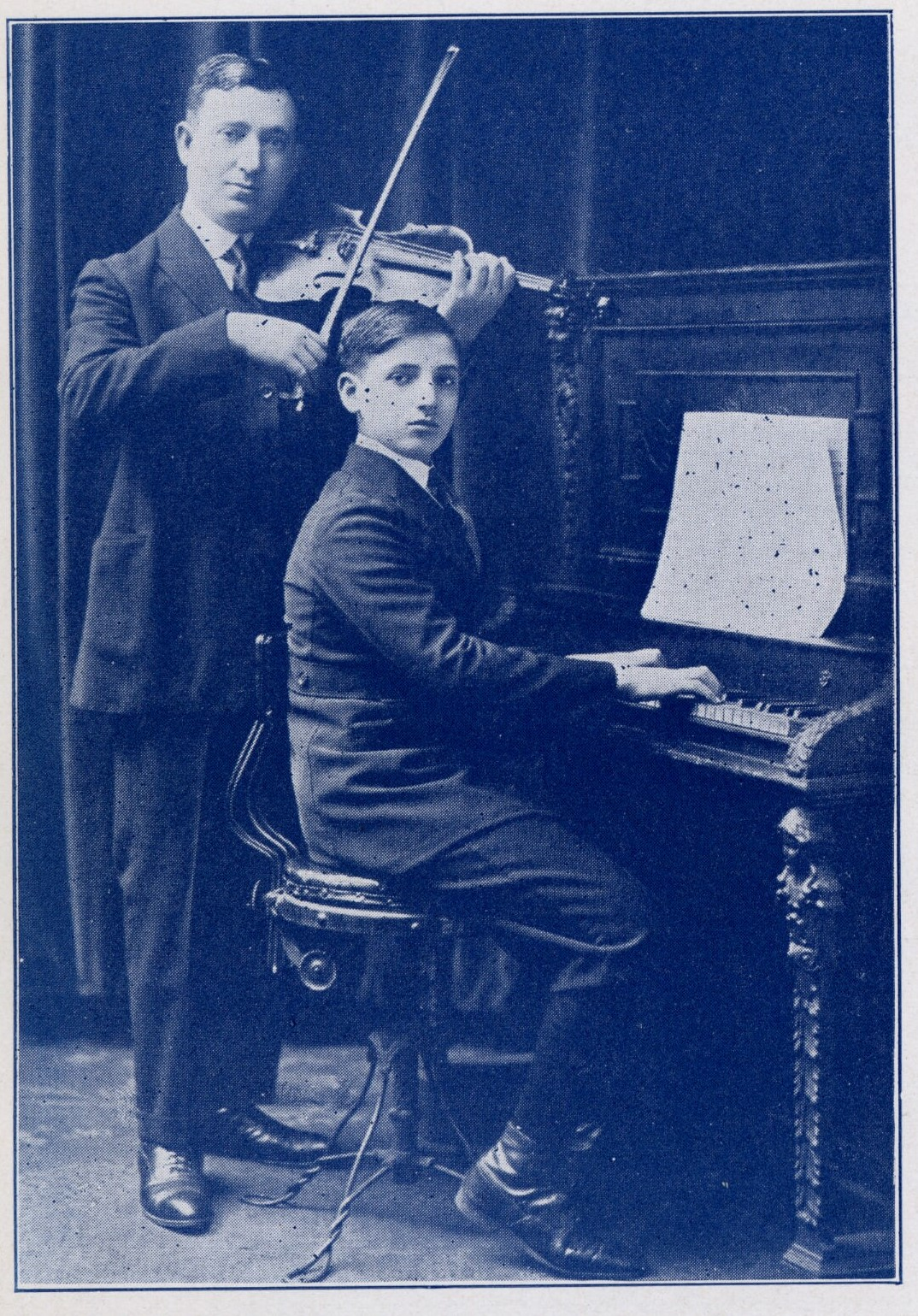
Portrait of Max Leibowitz, violinist, and son (Isidore?) from 1922 publisher score

Max Leibowitz (Yiddish: מאקס לײבאװיטש; born c.1884 in Iași, Romania, died 1942, Bronx, New York City) was an American klezmer violinist, composer and bandleader in New York City primarily in the 1910s and 1920s. He is mainly remembered today for his violin and ensemble 78 rpm recordings which are notable representation of early American klezmer music.

== Biography ==
=== Early life ===
Leibowitz was born in Iași, Romania in June 1883 or 1884. Little is known about his family background, whether he was from a klezmer family, or what his musical training was. In September 1905 he emigrated to the United States along with his wife Sarah. He had 3 children: Isadore (born c.1908), Molly (c.1911) and Albert (born 1920).

=== Music career ===
It isn't clear what Leibowitz did for the first decade he was in the United States, although in the 1910 census he did list his occupation as musician. It was in June 1916, possibly because World War I made local musicians more valuable to record companies, that he was first recruited to record a test pressing for the Victor Recording Company. He then followed it with a disc released on Columbia Records of himself playing violin accompanied by cimbalom, a highly traditional pairing in Eastern Europe, but one which was only rarely recorded in American Jewish music. Those recordings were made with the cimbalom player "Silver", who may be Jacob Silber (1882-1952), who otherwise played percussion in Leibowitz's and other klezmer orchestras, as well as the xylophone in later years.

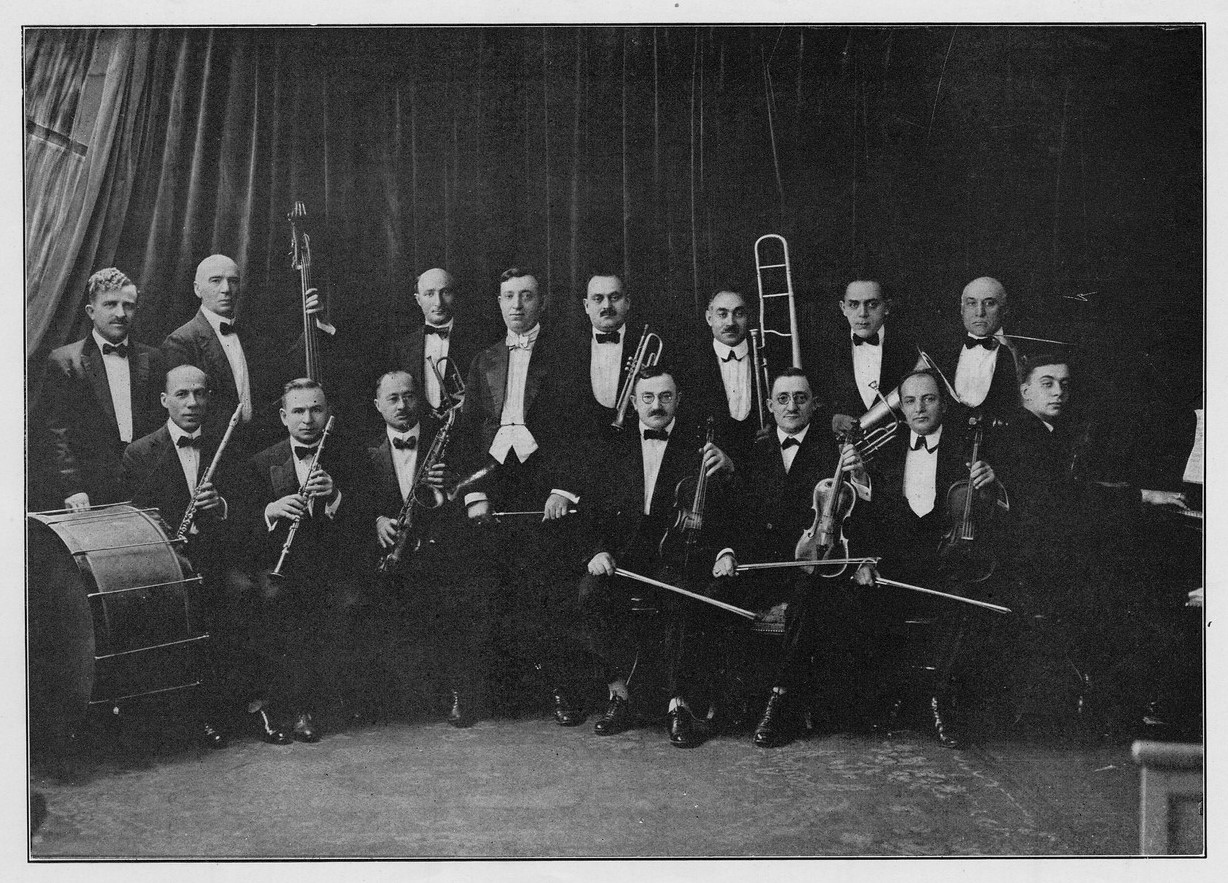
Max Leibowitz klezmer orchestra circa 1921

He was a contemporary of other Romanian-born klezmer bandleaders and recording artists in the New York City area that included Abe Schwartz, Joseph Moskowitz, Abe Katzman, and Milu Lemisch (in Philadelphia). He is listed as composer of some Yiddish songs recorded in the early twentieth century, such as Der yold is mich mekone ("The fool envies me.") and Es iz shoin farfallen. Irene Heskes, compiler of Yiddish popular music listings, lists Leibowitz as part of a large cohort of "Jewish bandsmen" such as Naftule Brandwein, Dave Tarras, Harry Kandel and others who "fashioned unique qualities for the Jewish dance tunes in America" during that era. There was often tough competition between these bandleaders; in 1923 Leibowitz sued Naftule Brandwein for allegedly plagiarizing a klezmer tune he had already copyrighted. The case ended up being dismissed because Leibowitz had still been a Romanian citizen when he had copyrighted the work, which gave him less protection than an American citizen would have had. After that lawsuit, the two men must have reconciled, because they continued to work together. In 1926 Leibowitz and his son Isidore opened a short-lived Romanian restaurant in Newark, New Jersey, and soon recruited Brandwein as a regular guest.

Leibowitz died in the Bronx in 1942 at age 57. He was buried in the Baron Hirsch Cemetery in Staten Island.

== Selected recordings ==
- Yiddischer tanz/Yiddisch chusidel (1916)
- Tanzt, Tanzt, Yiddelach/Beim Rebeh's Sideh (1917)
- Orientalishe Melodien (1919)
- Der Galitzianer Chosid/Yiddisher Bulgar (1920)
- Russian Sher Quadril/Mazel Tov (1920)
