= Abe Schwartz =

American violinist, composer, and bandleader

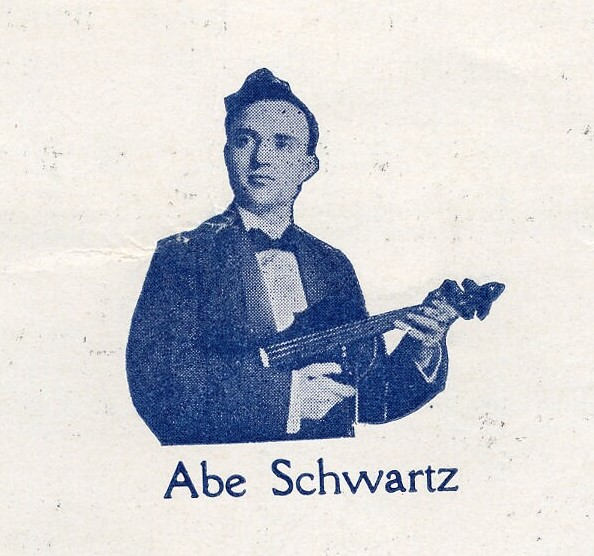
A portrait of Abe Schwartz from the cover of Die shaine yugend score (1922)

Abe Schwartz (Yiddish: אבּ שװארץ or אייב שווארץ) (1881 near Bucharest, Romania – 1963 in Bronx, New York City) was an American klezmer violinist, composer, Yiddish theater and ethnic recordings bandleader from the 1910s to the 1940s. In his various orchestras, he recorded many of the leading klezmer musicians of the early twentieth century, including Naftule Brandwein and Dave Tarras.

== Biography ==
Schwartz was born outside of Bucharest, Romania on April 15, 1881. In immigration documents he gave his birthplace as "Mihaleni" (Mihăileni). It is unclear what musical education he received there, but according to klezmer researcher Henry Sapoznik, his father was a tinsmith who tried to discourage Abe from becoming a musician. Schwartz emigrated to the United States with his parents sometime between 1900 and 1902. In the US he eventually married his wife Rose and had a son Louis, as well as four daughters: Mary, Ida, Bebe, and Sylvia, who recorded a few times accompanying her father on the piano.

In the 1900s and 1910s he worked as a dance band leader in the New York City area. He was among a cohort of Romanian-born klezmer bandleaders that included Max Leibowitz, Abe Katzman, and Milu Lemisch. During the First World War he gave his place of employment as musician at the Little Bessarabia Restaurant on East Houston Street. At some point he met David Nodiff, Artists and repertoire (A&R) man for Columbia Records. In 1917 Nodiff hired Schwartz to organize instrumental performances of ethnic music for the label as well as to seek out new Jewish talent for future recordings. Among these discoveries were Naftule Brandwein, the "king of klezmer clarinet", who could be heard playing clarinet on some of Schwartz's recordings around 1920, before he formed his own orchestra at the competing Victor Records. As Jeffrey Wollock put it, "an independent contractor for Columbia's East European (and possibly other ethnic) records, [...] it was Schwartz's job to put bands together." Wollock continues: "Schwartz was a "house conductor" in the foreign department, and his bands consisted of whomever he hired for the session. Since he often did without written arrangements, relying on his players to "know what to do," the playing on most of his band recordings is vernacular, spontaneous, and somewhat ramshackle."

By 1919 Schwartz published his first song "Dos Zekele mit Koilen" and recorded it with Yiddish language singer Abraham Moskowitz, marking Schwartz's entry into the world of Yiddish theater music. In that year he also recorded a number of non-Jewish recordings under pseudonyms such as Orkiestra Wiejska and Russky Narodny Orkestr.

In 1920, in preparation to record another round of klezmer tunes, he copyrighted roughly 35 pieces, which are viewable through the Library of Congress today.

His most famous tune, which is still performed today, was Di Grine Kuzine (the Green cousin). The song was so successful that it spawned a number of imitator in the world of published scores, such as Hyman Prizant's Mayn Kuzine and Jacob Leiserowitz's Di Grine Kuizine. It was also recorded by several artists, including Abraham Moskowitz, Joseph Feldman and Morris Goldstein. The success of the song compelled Schwartz to write and publish a number of other Yiddish theater songs.

In 1923, when Naftule Brandwein left his orchestra to start his own at a competing label, clarinet player Schloimke (Sam) Beckerman replaced him Schwartz's orchestra. In 1927, he helped put together another ensemble, the Boiberiker Kapelye, which performed on the radio and on records for five years, and which included such soloists as Dave Tarras, Alex Fiedel, and Berish Katz.

Schwartz continued to record and compose through the 1930s, slowing down somewhat by the 1940s. His 1941 recording Ikh bin a Boarder bay mayn vayb was a notable success of his later career. He was still able to get regular and well-paying gigs playing klezmer music in the late 1940s, as reported by Marty Levitt who played with Schwartz in 1949. To him, Schwartz was just an elderly violinist, but many of the audience had followed his career since the 1920s and saw him as "an icon, a cult figure".

In the 1950s he retired from the music industry.

Schwartz died in the Morrisania Hospital in the Bronx at age 75 on May 7, 1963.
