= Di Naye Kapelye =

Hungarian klezmer band

Di Naye Kapelye is a Hungarian klezmer music group. The band formed in Budapest in 1993, and perform frequently throughout Europe. Their lyrics are primarily in Yiddish and Hungarian.

== Members ==
- Bob Cohen (violin, mandolin, koboz, cümbüş, flutes, Carpathian drum, vocals)
- Yankl Falk (clarinet, vocals)
- Ferenc Pribojszki (cimbalom, Carpathian drum, flutes)
- Antal Fekete (kontra)
- Gyula Kozma (bass, koboz, violin).

== Discography ==
- 1997 - Di Naye Kapelye (Oriente)
- 2001 - A Mazeldiker Yid (Oriente)
- 2008 - Traktorist (Oriente)
