= Joseph in the Land of Egypt =

1932 film

- Directed by: George Roland
- Based on: "Joseph and His Brethren"
- Produced by: Samuel Goldstein; Mortimer D. Sikawitt
- Starring: Joseph Green
- Edited by: Jean Roland
- Distributed by: Guaranteed Pictures Corporation
- Release date: June 1, 1932
- Running time: 80 min.
- Country: United States
- Languages: Yiddish; English subtitles

Joseph in the Land of Egypt (Yiddish title: Yoysef in Mitsraim) is a 1932 American historical drama film directed by George Roland and starring Joseph Green. The film is based on the biblical drama "Joseph and His Brethren". The film is considered to be the first talkie filmed in Yiddish.

== Production notes ==
Joseph in the Land of Egypt was intended to exploit the burgeoning Yiddish-speaking theater-going in America by introducing them to the new medium of film. Rather than creating an original film, Green took an Italian silent film of Jewish interest and dubbed it in Yiddish. Joseph Green, the producer, also took the starring role of Joseph for himself.

== Reception ==
The film was well received by audiences in both the United States and Europe. That summer, Green took his film to Poland, then the largest Jewish center in Europe. Although most theater owners were reluctant to show it there, fearing that it would spark anti-Semitism, he eventually found two theater owners who were willing to show the film during the week of Passover. According to one story, the theater owners barred the door of their office with their bodies and declared that Green could not leave until he agreed to allow them to show the film.

Joseph in the Land of Egypt was an immediate success and had a 30-week run at that theater before making its way through the rest of the country. With the film's success, Green went on to produce several more films in Poland, all of which were considered highlights of the Yiddish cinema.
