= Joseph Frankel =

American klezmer bandleader

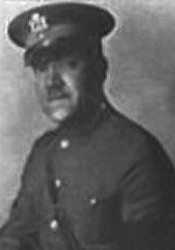
Joseph Frankel

Lieutenant Joseph Frankel (1882–1956) was an American klezmer musician, clarinetist and military band bandleader of the early 20th century.

== Biography ==
=== Early life ===
Frankel was born in Kyiv, Kiev Governorate, Russian Empire, on October 19, 1882. He began learning music at age five. He entered the Kiev Conservatory in 1896, graduating with honours in 1899. After graduating, he became bandleader for the 150th infantry unit of the Imperial Russian army.

=== Music career ===
In 1904, Frankel toured the United States as the head of the Russian 14th regiment military band. He decided to settle in the New York area, and married his wife Ida in 1905.

At the outbreak of the First World War he was on tour in South America with a Russian orchestra. He decided to become an American citizen and enlisted in the U.S. Army, becoming bandmaster of the 1st Field Artillery Regiment in New York City.

His main recorded output took place during the period immediately after the First World War. During the period of 1919 to 1921 he recorded a series of klezmer music recordings for Columbia Records. Some of these recordings incorporated elements of popular American music, with titles such as Yiddelach Shimmy Tantz (1919) or Yiddishe Blues (1919).

In the 1920s Frankel relocated to Philadelphia, where he directed a number of orchestras, not only the band of the 108th Field Artillery Regiment, the Municipal Band of Philadelphia, and the Hahnemann College orchestra. He apparently resigned his military commission in 1926. In 1928 Frankel volunteered his time as a bandleader to train a 25-person band at the National Farm School. In the 1930s, with funding from the Works Progress Administration, Frankel put together a 90-person orchestra.

Frankel died while visiting Boston on July 12, 1956.
