= Sam Musiker =

American clarinetist and saxophonist

Sam Musiker (1916–1964) was an American clarinetist and saxophonist whose career spanned both jazz and klezmer music. He is best known as the musical director of the album Tanz (Columbia, 1955) which also featured his brother Ray Musiker and his father-in-law Dave Tarras.

== Biography ==
Musiker was born in New York and lived there for much of his life. As a professional musician he moved through New York's complex musical milieu, equally at home playing in bars, restaurants and recording sessions among jazz and swing musicians as when playing at the upstate hotels, weddings and cabaret settings at the heart of the Jewish musical world.

While serving as a staff sergeant in the World War II era, Musiker led the 669th Army Air Force Band. In the early 1960s, he worked an elementary school teacher at Marion Street School in Lynbrook, Long Island, New York, where he wrote the Marion Street School song which is still sung on occasion today.

In later life Musiker moved to Tucson, Arizona, where he taught clarinet and saxophones and continued to write and arrange music, albeit with little professional recognition as both swing and klezmer had fallen from fashion and were yet to be revived.

While living in Tucson, Musiker wrote a song for Tucson High School's Concert and Hi Cats bands combined on stage. I was in both as the swing band members were in both. The concert band began the song and when the song switched to the swing band those members stood up from within the concert band. I was lucky to have had professional Trombone player Wayne Webb teach the course an hour every day for four years and we played all the dances those four years and were paid union scale.

Musiker's life, career and family history embody the transition of klezmer music from its European roots to a new and distinctive American style over the course of the 20th Century. Dave Tarras carried the musical traditions of the old world to New York in the 1920s; through the 1940s and 1950s, Sam Musiker brought new influences to klezmer from his professional experience in jazz and swing; and his younger brother Ray Musiker carried this authentic musical experience forwards to a new generation of musicians in the Klezmer revival.

== Career ==
=== Jazz ===
Sam Musiker played professionally from about the age of 20 onwards. He joined Gene Krupa's band at its inception in 1938, following Krupa's departure from Benny Goodman's band. Musiker remained with the Gene Krupa Orchestra, playing saxophone and clarinet, until its breakup in 1944 and performed on most of the band's recordings, including solos on "Blue Rhythm Fantasy," "Full Dress Hop," and "Let Me Off Uptown." In addition, Musiker played with Glenn Miller and had arranged music for several NBC shows.

He also played (and recorded) with Sarah Vaughan, including appearances on the Ted Dale Orchestra's 1947 recordings of 'Love Me or Leave Me' and 'I Get a Kick Out of You'.

Musiker later was an arranger and composer with the Tucson Pops Orchestra.

=== Klezmer ===
Musiker performed and recorded klezmer music extensively throughout his life, often playing with his brother Ray Musiker and father-in-law Dave Tarras. He is recognized as an innovative and influential klezmer musician, incorporating elements of jazz and swing to create a distinctive and characteristic 'New York' klezmer style. As well as his own band, the Sam Musiker Orchestra, he played and recorded with numerous other klezmer musicians in the busy and fertile New York Jewish musical community of the 1930s and '40s. The Sam Musiker Orchestra appeared on Jack Paar's TV show and played in venues as late as the early 1960s.

Musiker's arrangements in surviving recordings have a distinct sound with a rhythm described as "bustling" and "propulsive", with the drummer accenting the first, fourth and seventh quaver of each 4/4 bar, the double bass providing a steady pulse on the beat and either piano or accordion playing chords on the off-beats. Musiker regularly used an accordion within arrangements to generate a rich, full sound with a relatively small band.

=== Tanz ===
Musiker is perhaps best known for the album Tanz, recorded in 1955 and released in 1956 on the 'Epic' label, an imprint of CBS/Columbia. The album includes traditional tunes, theater music and original material written by Sam Musiker and Dave Tarras, who played on the recording along with Ray Musiker. The project was an ambitious attempt to blend klezmer with big band swing arrangements. The original release was not well marketed and the album failed to find an audience. However, it has since been recognized as a landmark in Jewish-American music and achieved more popularity. The album has since been re-released by Sony on the Legacy imprint.
