= Simeon Bellison =

American clarinetist and composer

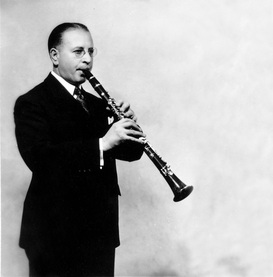
Simeon Bellison

Simeon Bellison (September 4, 1881 – May 4, 1953), born in Moscow, was a clarinetist and composer. He became a naturalised American after settling in the US in 1921. Bellison established an early clarinet choir (including women) in the United States; from an initial eight members, the group's size grew by 1948 to 75 members. Bellison was later the first clarinetist of the New York Philharmonic. The Philharmonic's online archive contains papers related to Bellison's leadership of his Philharmonic-sponsored clarinet ensemble, including various clarinets owned by the Philharmonic for the group's use, insurance policies, and sale of many of these in 1943.

In addition to some hundred works for clarinet, Bellison wrote a novel, "Jivoglot," (Eat 'em Alive), based on the life of poor and obscure musicians in historic Russia.

== Death ==
Bellison died in New York City in 1953.
