= Joseph Feldman =

American singer and actor (1886–1967)

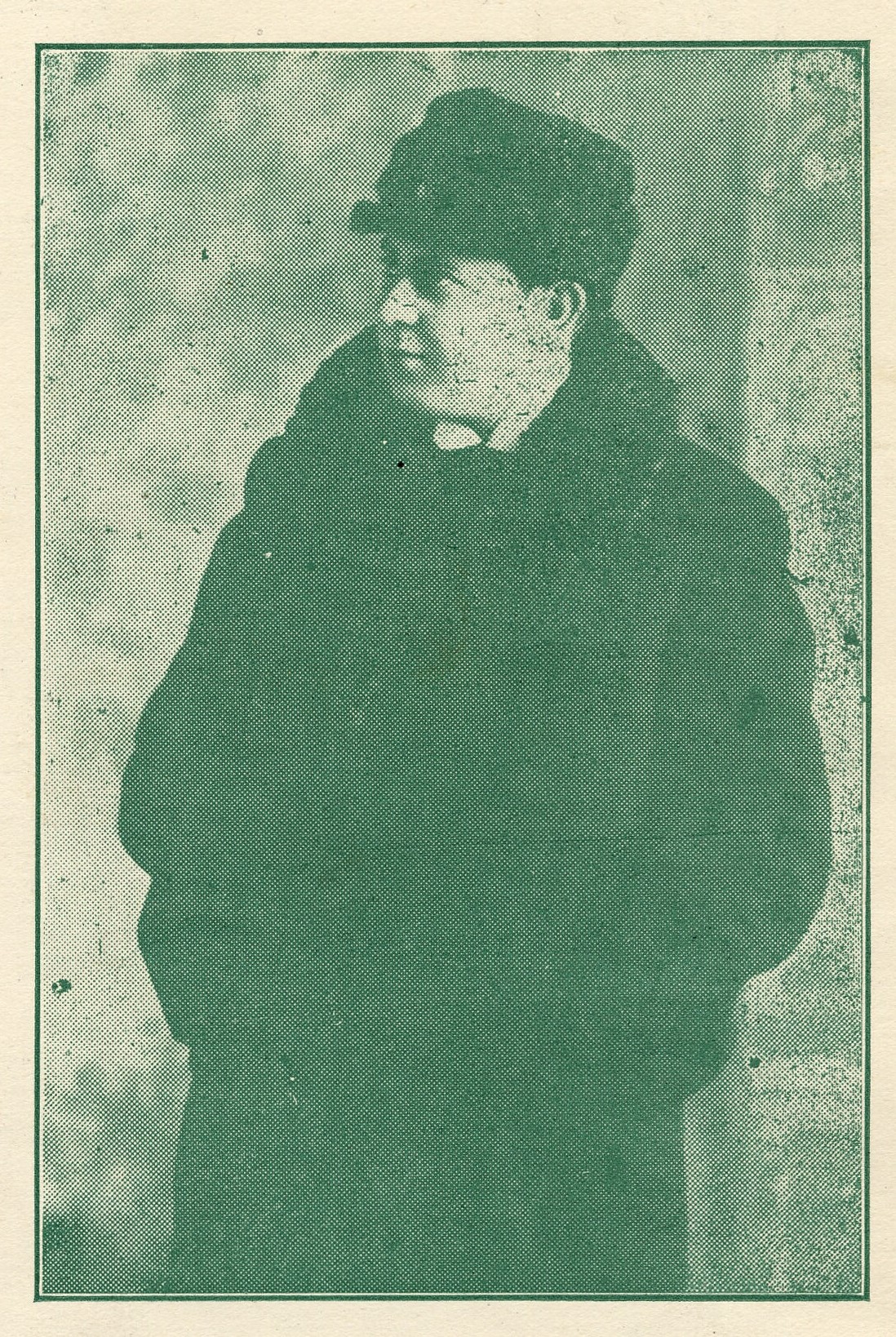
Joseph Feldman portrait from Shichelach score

Joseph Feldman (Yiddish: יוסף פֿעלדמאַן, 1886–1967), also known as Joe Feldman, was a Yiddish language tenor, Yiddish Theatre actor, and composer who recorded numerous theatre and comedy songs between 1916 and 1927.

== Biography ==
=== Early life ===
Feldman was born in Galați, Romania on September 15, 1886. His parents were Louis and Sarah Feldman; his father was a Glazier. At age 8 he started training with cantors and became a choir soloist, but was already becoming more interested in acting. He emigrated to New York City with his family in June 1900.

=== Music and acting career ===
In New York, Feldman soon involved himself in the Yiddish Theatre world, getting his start in a music hall on Eldridge Street which was frequented by many Yiddish actors. By 1905 he already listed his occupation in the census as an actor. He soon made a name for himself and before and during the First World War toured with various productions to other cities including Philadelphia, Boston, Chicago, and Montreal.

It was by the end of 1913 that he returned to New York and started his first test recording with a phonograph company, with one of his famous pieces Shichelach. It in 1916 that he started recording many more tracks, first for Columbia Records, but soon also at Brunswick Records, Emerson Records, Victor Records, Okeh Records, Pathé Records, and even for lesser known companies like the Cardinal Phonograph Company. He also apparently composed the music for many of his songs; according to copyright records, he composed roughly 30 pieces, occasionally with the lyrics written by others.

Feldman apparently worked as a phonograph salesman during this period as well, spending a period in 1919 and 1920 in Montreal on behalf of the Columbia Graphophone Company along with his wife and son.

With the passing of the Immigration Act of 1924 which greatly restricted Jewish immigration from Europe, and then the onset of the Great Depression by 1930, the market for Yiddish and klezmer recordings in the United States saw a steep decline, which essentially ended the recording career of many of the popular Yiddish artists of the 1910s and 1920s. Joseph's recording career seems to have ended around then, with a last round of recordings made for Victor Records in 1927.

At some point Feldman relocated to Philadelphia. For a time around 1932 he took over management of the Earle Theatre. His World War Two draft card lists him as living there, still working as an actor.

During his career Feldman was a supporter of Zionism. One of his original compositions copyrighted in the early 1920s was titled "Palistine lidall / Palistine song", and at around the same time his likeness was used to sell scores for another by David Meyerowitz, Zion's Liedele. After the Second World War he also released a song celebrating the creation of the State of Israel called Mazel tov Yisroel.

Feldman died on May 18, 1967, in Monterey Park, California.

=== Family ===
Joseph's wife was named Lena or Lina (née Carmen). They were married in January 1916. Their first and apparently only child Rachmiel (Ralph) was born in 1917.
