= Dave Tarras =

American klezmer musician (c. 1895–1989)

Dave Tarras (c. 1895 – February 13, 1989) was a Ukrainian-born American klezmer clarinetist and bandleader, who was instrumental in the Klezmer revival.

== Biography ==
=== Early life ===
Tarras was born David Tarasiuk in Teplyk, Ukraine and later moved to Ternivka, a village which was then in Podolia Governorate, Russian Empire and which is now in Teplytskyi Raion, Vinnytsia Oblast, Ukraine. His exact birthday is disputed; it is often given as March 15, 1895, but other credible accounts give it as 1898. He came from a klezmer family; to the family of Rakhmil Tarasyuk, who was a klezmer trombonist, and Sheyndl, his grandfather was a fiddler and badkhn and Dave's five brothers became professional musicians as well. Dave grew up playing a variety of instruments and immersed in klezmer music. His main instrument was the flute for several years, until he switched to the clarinet in around 1909. By that time he could also play the Balalaika, guitar, and mandolin. He was conscripted into the tsar's army in 1915, but his talents as a musician kept him out of the trenches.

After leaving the Russian empire, Tarras lived in Bucharest, Romania for a short time. After making his way to Great Britain, he sailed for New York City in 1921, where he worked in a garment factory for a time.

=== Music career ===
Eventually he found he could make money as a musician, and worked as a clarinetist in many of New York's klezmer ensembles. He also became the preferred accompanist to many popular stars of Yiddish theater and for some of the great cantors of the time period. In addition to Jewish music, he also recorded Greek, Polish and Russian tunes. His ability to play different styles was further masked by the use of pseudonyms on his recordings for Columbia Records. It is conservatively estimated that he participated in 500 recordings during his career. The Dave Tarras Orchestra made numerous New York City radio appearances, starting in the 1930s.

His skill and reliability enabled him to play for many years longer than the other klezmer pioneers of his day (Naftule Brandwein, for example had retired or left the business). Tarras' experience playing in the czarist military band, his ability to read music, and his excellent command of the Yiddish style made him a favorite among bandleaders. After klezmer music fell out of fashion following World War II, Tarras remained one of the few musicians to still record and play actively. His style has been characterized as smooth and dignified, with deliberate and rhythmical phrasing. His personal repertoire came from his Bessarabian roots and the influences of Jewish and Roma music. Zev Feldman has credited Tarras with not only "Bessarabianizing" Jewish dance music, but also with replacing what had been the dominant tune style of the freylekh with the Bulgar.

Tarras' most enduring recording, Tanz! (1956) was the brainchild of his son-in-law, clarinetist and saxophonist Sam Musiker. The San Francisco Examiner called it an "unusual folk album," noting that Tarras and Musiker "provide lively, gay, dancing music, under which lies often that same sardonic note which underlies the humor of Sholem Aleichim." The album, which successfully combines jazz and klezmer idioms, was not generally well received in its day, but remains central to the canon of present-day revivalists. Over the course of his career, Tarras was recognized for creating "a new klezmer sound that fused popular American music with recognizable European roots".

At the beginning of the klezmer revival in the 1970s and 80s, Tarras mentored many young musicians who went on to become famous, including clarinetist and mandolinist Andy Statman.

Tarras was a recipient of a 1984 National Heritage Fellowship awarded by the National Endowment for the Arts, which is the United States government's highest honor in the folk and traditional arts.

Tarras died of pneumonia in February 1989 at South Nassau Communities Hospital in Oceanside, New York. He was buried in the Montefiore Cemetery.

== Family ==
Tarras's wife was named Sarah. When Tarras died in 1989 an obituary noted that he was survived by his brother (Froika), a daughter (Brouny), a son (Seymour), and seven grandchildren.
