= List of klezmer musicians =

This is a list of klezmer musicians:

- Michael Alpert
- Gérard Barreaux
- Shloimke (Sam) Beckerman
- Sidney Beckerman
- Ofer Ben-Amots
- Alan Bern
- Geoff Berner
- Naftule Brandwein
- Stuart Brotman
- Don Byron
- Brian Choper
- Adrienne Cooper
- Christian Dawid
- Abe Elenkrieg
- Giora Feidman
- Jacob Gegna
- Chaim-Meir Gegner
- German Goldenshteyn
- Jeremiah Hescheles
- Daniel Hoffman (violinist)
- Jacob Hoffman
- Elaine Hoffman-Watts
- Alex Jacobowitz
- Daniel Kahn
- David Krakauer
- Max Leibowitz
- César Lerner
- Margot Leverett
- Frank London
- Joseph Moskowitz
- Hankus Netsky
- Moni Ovadia
- Elie Rosenblatt
- Jason Rosenblatt
- Pete Rushefsky
- Henry Sapoznik
- Abe Schwartz
- Elizabeth Schwartz
- Cookie Segelstein
- Andy Statman
- H. Steiner
- Yale Strom
- Alicia Svigals
- Dave Tarras
- Michael Winograd
- Max Yankowitz
