= Rosenblatt =

Rosenblatt is a surname of German and Jewish origin, meaning "rose leaf". People with this surname include:

- Albert Rosenblatt (born 1936), American judge from New York
- Cy Rosenblatt (born 1954), American politician from Mississippi
- Dana Rosenblatt, known as "Dangerous" (born 1972), American boxer
- Elie Rosenblatt (born 1979), Canadian-born Klezmer violinist
- Frank Rosenblatt (1928–1971), American psychologist notable in the field of artificial intelligence
- Jason Rosenblatt (born 1973), Canadian-born multi-instrumentalist and vocalist
- Jay S. Rosenblatt (1923–2014), American psychologist and animal behavior researcher
- Joan R. Rosenblatt (1926–2018), American statistician
- Johnny Rosenblatt (1907–1979), American politician from Nebraska
- Jonathan Rosenblatt (born 1956), American Rabbi
- Leida Rosenblatt, birth name of Epp Kaidu (1915–1976), Soviet and Estonian theatre director and actress
- Louise Rosenblatt (1904–2005), American literary critic
- Mark Rosenblatt (born 1977 or 1978), British director and writer
- Murray Rosenblatt (1926–2019), American statistician
- Paul Gerhardt Rosenblatt (1928–2019), American judge from Arizona
- Richard Rosenblatt (born 1969), American businessman
- Richard Heinrich Rosenblatt (1930–2015) American ichthyologist
- Roger Rosenblatt (born 1940), American journalist, author, playwright and teacher
- Rose Rosenblatt (born 1947), American film director
- Scott Rosenblatt (born 1967), a name partner of Reitler Kailas & Rosenblatt, a prominent venture capital law firm
- Sultana Levy Rosenblatt (1910–2007), Brazilian writer
- Susan Rosenblatt, later Susan Sontag (1933–2004), American author, filmmaker, philosopher, literary theorist and political activist
- Therese Steinhardt Rosenblatt (1896–1920), American painter
- Wibrandis Rosenblatt (1504–1564), German Christian active in the Protestant Reformation
- William Rosenblatt (1906–1999), American politician from New York
- Yossele Rosenblatt (1882–1933), Ukrainian-born Jewish cantor

== See also ==
- IEEE Frank Rosenblatt Award, presented for contributions to biologically or linguistically motivated computational paradigms
- Johnny Rosenblatt Stadium, baseball stadium in Omaha, Nebraska
