= Lipstick Building =

Office building in Manhattan, New York

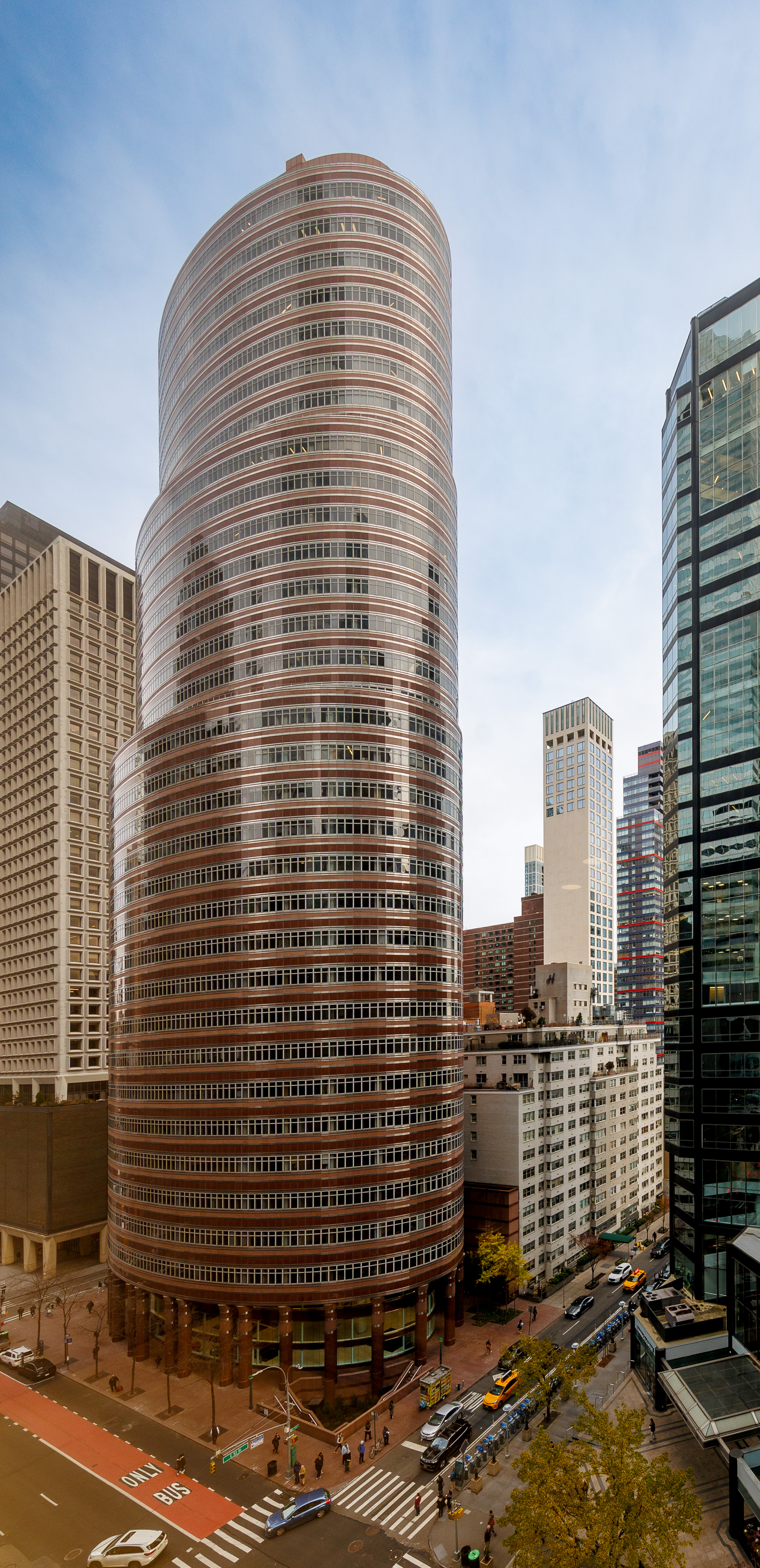

General information
- Status: Completed
- Type: Office
- Location: 885 Third Avenue, Manhattan, New York, U.S.
- Coordinates: 40°45′28″N 73°58′08″W
- Completed: 1986

Height
- Roof: 138 m (453 ft)

Technical details
- Floor count: 34

Design and construction
- Architects: John Burgee and Philip Johnson
- Structural engineer: The Office of Irwin Cantor
- Services engineer: Cosentini Associates (mechanical)

The Lipstick Building, also known as 885 Third Avenue and 53rd at Third, is a 453-foot-tall (138 m) office building at Third Avenue between 53rd Street and 54th Street in the Midtown Manhattan neighborhood of New York City, New York, U.S. It was completed in 1986 and has 34 floors. The building was designed by John Burgee and Philip Johnson for Hines Interests and was developer Gerald D. Hines's first project in New York City. The building's nickname is derived from its shape and color, which resemble those of a lipstick tube.

The building has a nearly elliptical massing, with setbacks above the 19th and 27th stories, as well as a two-story granite penthouse. The structure is actually polygonal; both the base and the setback sections have over a hundred sides. The building stands on double-height columns at the base, and the facade is made of red Imperial granite and stainless steel. On the northeast side of the building is a nine-story-tall rectangular annex. The building has 580,000 square feet (54,000 m^{2}) of rentable space, some of which was built in exchange for improvements to the Lexington Avenue/51st Street station. To brace the building against winds from the north, structural engineer Irwin Cantor designed a tube support system and a central core for the building's superstructure.

Hines Interests bought the site from Citigroup in 1981 and hired Burgee and Johnson to design an elliptical office building for the site. Construction started in May 1984 and the building was completed two years later. In the first several years of the building's history, the office space was generally profitable. Hines sold the building in 2004 to Tishman Speyer, which resold a partial stake to Prudential Real Estate Investors. Metropolitan 885 Third Avenue LLC then acquired the building in 2007 under a complex financing agreement in which the underlying land was sold separately to SL Green. After Metropolitan went bankrupt in 2010, Inversiones y Representaciones Sociedad Anónima and Marciano Investment Group assumed ownership. Ceruzzi Properties and SMI USA acquired the land in 2015, and SL Green took over the building in 2021.

== Site ==
The Lipstick Building is at 885 Third Avenue in the Midtown Manhattan neighborhood of New York City, New York, U.S. It takes up the western part of a city block bounded by Third Avenue to the west, 54th Street to the north, Second Avenue to the east, and 53rd Street to the south. The L-shaped land lot covers 26,108 ft^{2} (2,425.5 m^{2}) with a frontage of 200 ft (61 m) on Third Avenue and a depth of 160 ft (49 m). Other nearby buildings include 599 Lexington Avenue to the southwest, the Citigroup Center at 601 Lexington Avenue to the west, and 919 Third Avenue two blocks north.

An entrance to the New York City Subway's Lexington Avenue/51st Street station (served by the 6, <6>, E, F, and <F> trains) is next to the building. The entrance cost the building's developer $7 million and was built to increase the amount of space in the building. Under normal zoning regulations, the maximum floor area ratio (FAR) for any building on the tower's site was 15. The developers received a bonus of 20 percent for improving the subway entrance, bringing the FAR to 18. The entrance consists of a staircase and escalator. There is also a landscaped planter next to the subway entrance, adjacent to the building's curved promenade.

Prior to 885 Third Avenue's construction, the site had contained low-rise buildings. Citicorp, which occupied 601 Lexington Avenue immediately to the west, bought the site in mid-1980 for over $7.2 million. Citicorp had intended to erect a residential building there. Within a year, the bank decided to sell the site due to an increase in real-estate values.

== Architecture ==
The Lipstick Building at 885 Third Avenue was designed by Philip Johnson and John Burgee for developer Gerald D. Hines. Structural engineer Irwin Cantor, mechanical engineer Cosentini Associates, landscape architects Zion and Breen Associates, and lighting consultant Claude Engle were also involved in the building's development. It is 34 stories tall and measures 453 feet (138 m) to its roof. Though the building was officially known as Fifty-third at Third, its unusual massing and the facade's color led to its popular name, the Lipstick Building. It is one of several buildings in New York City that were nicknamed based on their appearance.

As of 2020, due to a legal technicality, the building and the underlying land have separate owners, and the land itself is divided into two ownership sections. A 50-by-110-foot (15 by 34 m) plot on Third Avenue, covering about 21 percent of the site, is owned by a limited liability corporation and leased to SL Green, the owner of the rest of the site.

=== Form and facade ===
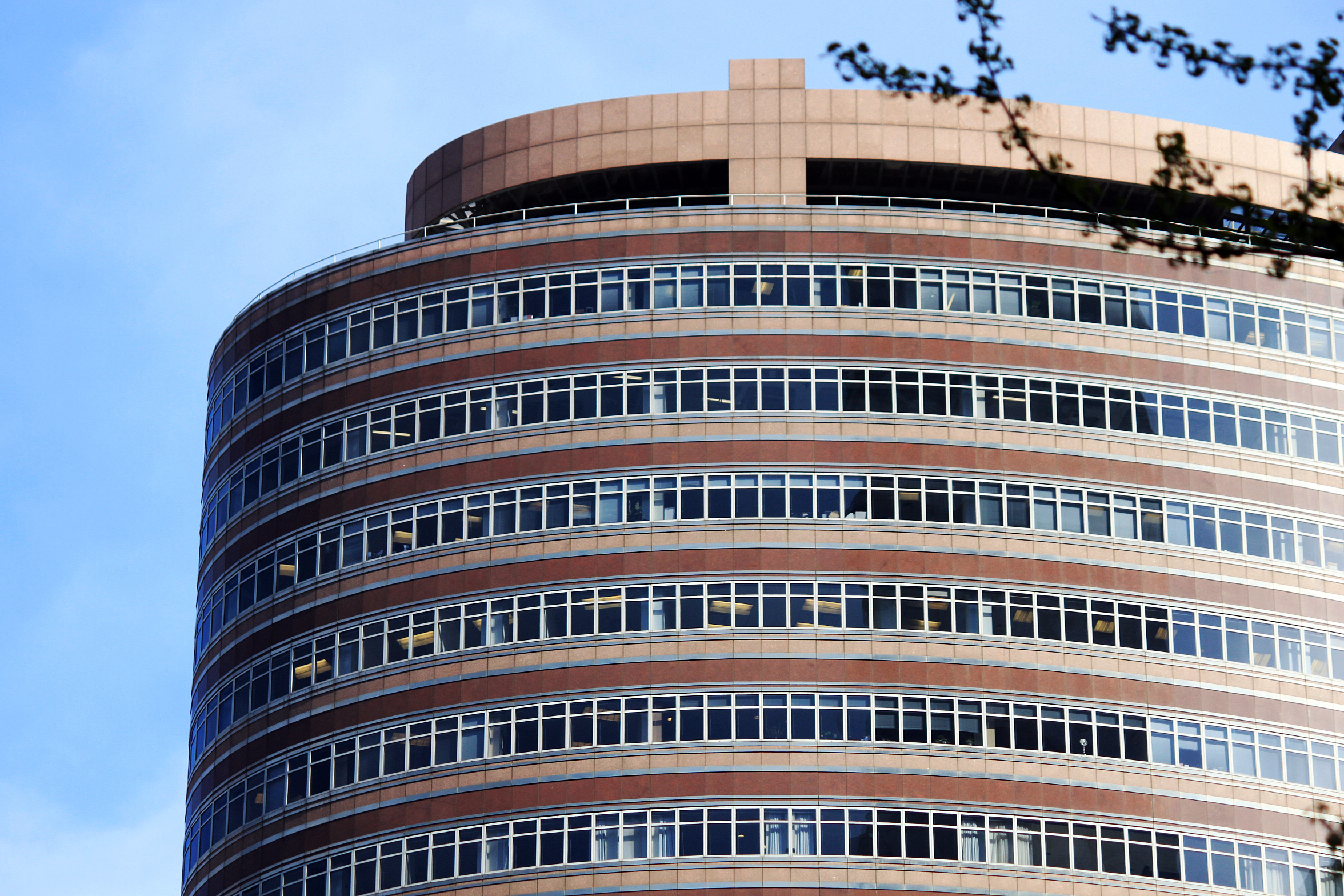
Detail of the top of the building

885 Third Avenue has a nearly elliptical massing because, at the time of the building's development, the New York City Department of City Planning was considering rezoning Midtown Manhattan. (Note: The area was rezoned in 1982.) The massing contrasted with those of older buildings, which were typically designed with rectangular forms. The elliptical shape allows pedestrians on 53rd and 54th Street to cut across the corners, and it permits additional light and air into the building. Burgee said the design created "a memorable landmark along the blandness of Third Avenue", while noting that the shape was appropriate for Third Avenue but not Park Avenue, which had a more serious character. Critics compared the building's massing to a tube of lipstick and to a luxury liner.

The building is divided vertically into three sections. To comply with zoning laws, the Lipstick Building contains setbacks above the 19th and 27th stories, above which the elliptical massing continues. Although the building appears to be elliptical, the base and both setback sections are actually polygonal, as the outer walls are composed of facets measuring 2 feet 7.5 inches (80.0 cm) wide. The lowest section contains 180 sides; the midsection above the 19th story has 164 sides; and the top section above the 27th story has 156 sides. There is also a two-story mechanical space atop the roof, which is clad in granite and shaped like an ellipse. The northeastern part of the site contains a rectangular nine-story annex, the base of which contains a restaurant space.

At the base, the building is supported by 28 double-height stainless steel and granite columns, each 28 feet (8.5 m) high. The columns protrude in front of the glass-walled lobby. The tops of the columns are accented with alternately finished granite, separated by steel bands. Behind the columns is an arcade that wraps around a 300-degree section of the building's perimeter. There are plantings adjacent to the arcade on both 53rd and 54th Streets. The exterior of the building is formed of repeating stripes of polished and flame-finished red Swedish Imperial granite spandrels, belts of stainless steel and solar glass ribbon windows set within gray frames.

=== Features ===
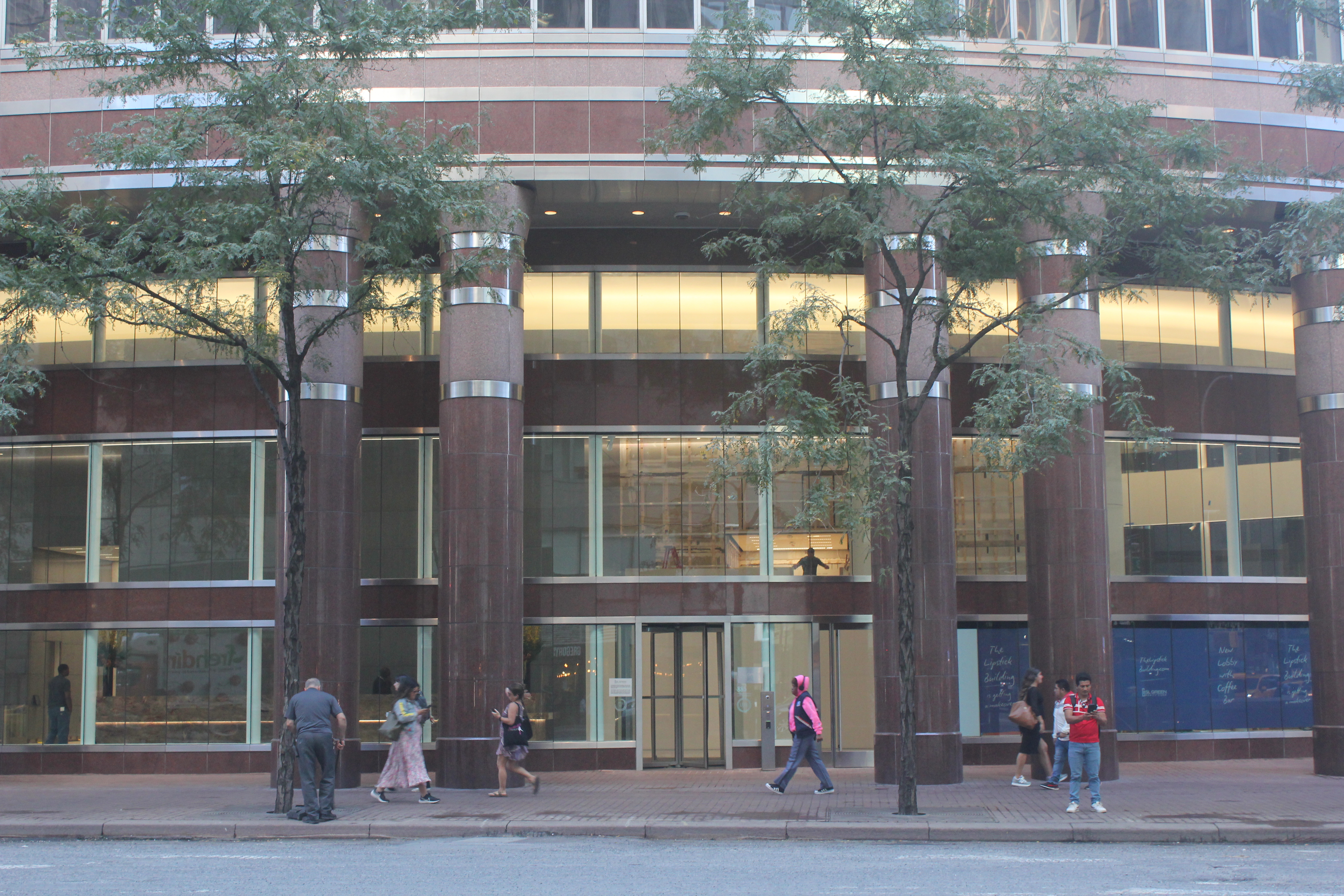
The building's base

The building has 580,000 square feet (54,000 m^{2}) of space. The site could accommodate 500,000 square feet of usable floor area without any zoning bonuses, but Hines Interests was allowed to add 71,544 square feet (6,646.7 m^{2}) in exchange for improvements to the adjacent subway entrance. The building's lobby contained floor tiles decorated in a checkerboard pattern, as well as a glass-mosaic ceiling. Part of the lobby was converted into a cafe in 1992. The cafe, which had marble and red-stone decorations and abutted a restaurant space, was removed in 2024. As part of this renovation, the original centrally located reception desk was moved to one side and the lobby interior was thoroughly whitewashed. In addition, a sculpture by Imi Knoebel stands in the lobby.

When 885 Third Avenue opened, it had four elevators with marble paneling. Each elevator cab used a different color of marble (green, brown, red, or rose). The elevators are placed on the east (rear) side of the building, allowing the rest of the tower to rise with setbacks. As part of a 2024 renovation, wooden paneling was added inside the elevator cabs.

885 Third Avenue's superstructure is made of reinforced concrete. It includes a tube support system and a central core that tapers at the upper levels. Due to the building's unusual shape and its location on the east side of Third Avenue, winds from the north would cause an extremely large amount of eastward pressure. As a result, structural engineer Irwin Cantor decided to add the central core, which absorbs most of the structural loads. The central core contains the elevators and emergency staircases. Also as a result of the building's unconventional shape, the office space and mechanical equipment had to be adjusted to fit the elliptical form of each story.

== History ==
=== Development ===
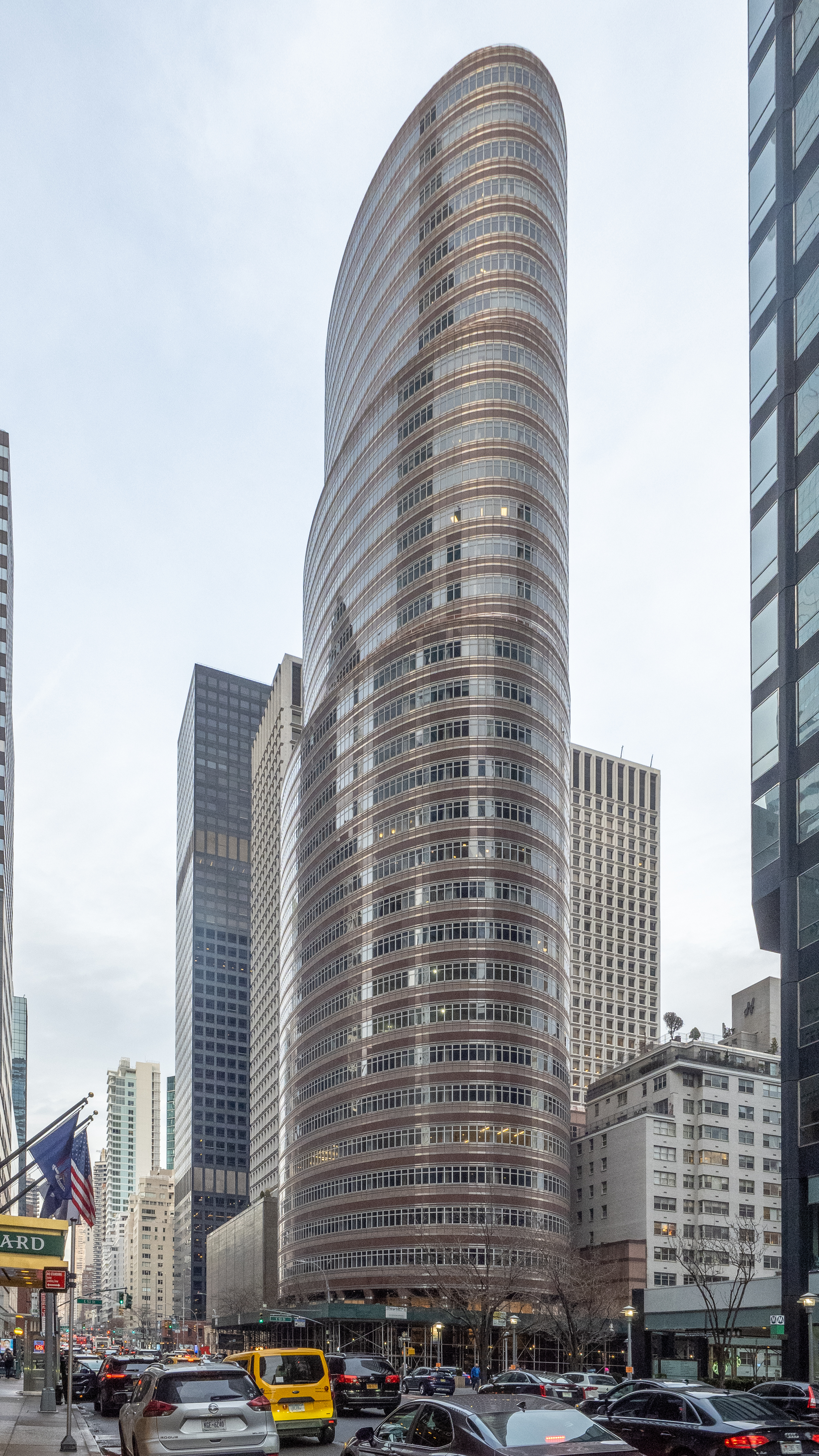
Seen from the south

In January 1981, Gerald Hines bought the site of 885 Third Avenue from Citicorp for $28 million. The land had cost over $1,000 per square foot ($11,000/m^{2}), a record price for land in Midtown Manhattan. This price did not include the cost of a leasehold in the middle of the block, which was acquired separately. At the time, Hines had developed 273 projects across the United States, but he had never before developed a structure in New York City. According to Hines, "We would like to do something that we're proud of and that the city would look favorably on." The site could be developed with an office building of up to 460,000 square feet (43,000 m^{2}). That April, Burgee and Johnson presented designs for an elliptical building on the site, but construction was not projected to begin for several years, since existing tenants' leases had yet to expire. By August 1981, the details of the project had still not been finalized. Kenneth Hubbard, who led Hines's New York City office, said the elliptical massing was the only certainty in the design.

In 1983, Hines Interests announced it would start constructing a 25- to 30-story building the following year, with 500,000 square feet (46,000 m^{2}) of space. At the time, a Hines spokesman said to The New York Times: "We have no tenants yet. Do you know any?" Hines Interests paid $1 million to relocate one resident on the site, Paul Brine, who was paying $90.14 a month for an apartment on the site and had refused to relocate. Hines Interests broke ground for the tower in May 1984, even though there still were no tenants; this contrasted with the firm's typical approach, where it signed a major tenant before starting construction. At the time, it was erecting an office building for EF Hutton at 40 West 53rd Street, and Hines Interests saw the two projects "as a similar commitment".

There was still uncertainty over the building's height as the foundation was being built, as Hines Interests and its partner Sterling Equities wanted to increase the building's floor area ratio by 20 percent in exchange for improving the adjacent subway stations. This would allow the developers to add 75,000 square feet (7,000 m^{2}), for a maximum area of 580,000 square feet (54,000 m^{2}). The bonus was ultimately approved. The project architect was Ronnette Riley of Burgee Johnson Architects, who oversaw the building's development. To attract tenants, Hines Interests opened a marketing center on the 31st floor of the nearby Seagram Building, where the firm exhibited scale models of 40 West 53rd Street and 885 Third Avenue. The developers predicted that they could charge $45 to $60 per square foot ($480 to $650/m^{2}) for the space. Tenants paid a modified net lease, but Hines Interests refunded any overpayments for taxes, utility costs, and operating costs.

=== Hines operation ===
The building was completed in 1986. 885 Third Avenue received mixed criticism in its early years and was nicknamed the "Lipstick Building" for its unusual shape, but the office space was profitable. About 65 percent of the building's space had been leased to a dozen tenants by mid-1986. Early tenants included a telecommunications center operated by Telecom Plus; First Interstate Bank Limited; ad agency Hill, Holliday, Connors, Cosmopolus; brokerage firm Bernard L. Madoff Investment Securities; and the Nathan Cummings Foundation. John Burgee and Philip Johnson relocated their firm's architectural offices to the tower, which Hines officials considered a "strong endorsement". By the end of the year, three-quarters of the building was occupied. Due to declining demand for office space, Hines Interests no longer expected to lease space to a few large tenants.

An Italian restaurant named Toscana Ristorante opened on the 54th Street side of the building in 1987, while a cafe opened on the 53rd Street side in 1999. By the early 1990s, Johnson said of the building: "When you say you work in the lipstick building, people know exactly where you are." The Lipstick Cafe opened in the lobby in 1992. The next year, Toscana Ristorante was replaced with a restaurant called Vong, designed by David Rockwell and Jay Haverson. By the early 2000s, the office tenants included law firm Bingham McCutchen, law firm Latham & Watkins, computer company Unisys, and financial firm Morgan Stanley.

=== 2000s ===
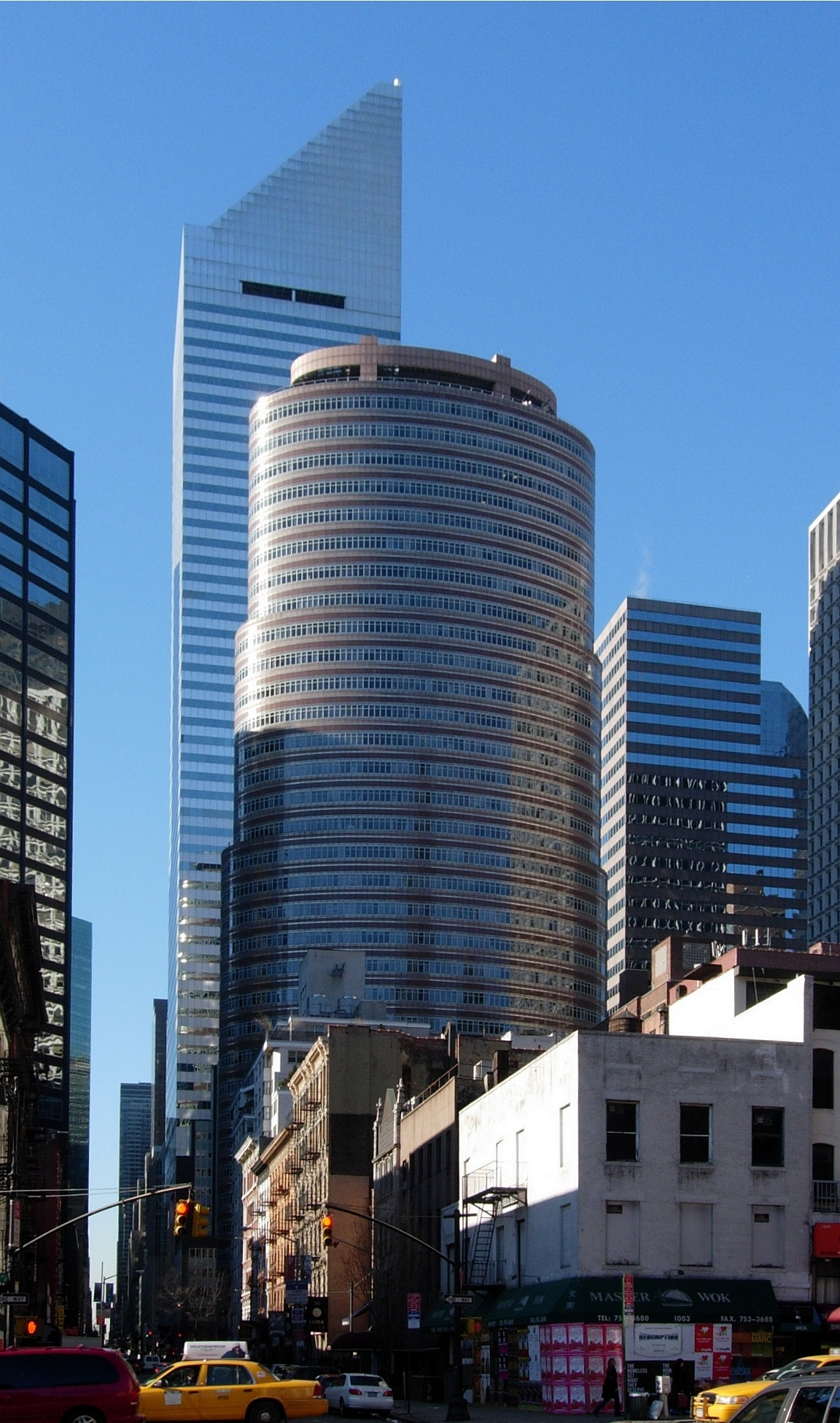
Seen from the east, with Citigroup Center behind

In January 2004, Tishman Speyer signed a contract to purchase the building. By then, landlords in New York City were buying up buildings in anticipation of rising rental rates. Later that year, Hines Interests sold the building to Tishman Speyer for $235 million. Latham & Watkins signed a 15-year lease for over half the building, or 319,665 square feet (29,697.9 m^{2}), in late 2004 amid growing demand for office space in Midtown Manhattan. TMW Property Funds, a fund managed by Prudential Real Estate Investors, bought a 49 percent interest in the building from Tishman Speyer in mid-2005 for $164 million. The sale valued the building at $335 million. Prudential represented a group of German investors in the transaction. By then, the building was 95 percent occupied. Tishman Speyer decided to place 885 Third Avenue for sale in March 2007. Prudential had wanted to sell the building, and real estate experts predicted the property could be sold for over $500 million.

A consortium known as Metropolitan 885 Third Avenue LLC bought the building in July 2007 for $648.5 million, finalizing their purchase the next month. Following the sale, Israeli companies Tao Tsuot and Financial Levers collectively owned a 70 percent stake in the building. The remainder was owned by Metropolitan Real Estate Investments, Marciano Investment Group, and a third investor. The sale included an option for the owners to acquire the underlying land in 2020 or later. As part of the same deal, SL Green acquired a fee interest for 79 percent of the underlying land, as well as a leasehold for the remaining 21 percent of the site, for $317 million. SL Green owned 55 percent of the fee interest and leasehold, while its partner Gramercy Capital Corp. owned the remaining 45 percent. This deal was part of a complicated financing package for the building itself. The building's owners also acquired a $210 million first mortgage loan from the Royal Bank of Canada (RBC), as well as a $60 million preferred equity loan from Goldman Sachs. The site acquisition, first mortgage loan, and preferred equity loan amounted to $587 million in financing. Wachovia had offered to finance 90 percent of the building's purchase price but ultimately reneged from the deal.

Although the majority of the space was already under long-term lease to Latham & Watkins, the new owners expressed confidence that the remaining space, which was occupied by a variety of small tenants, could be rented out at high rates. About 42 percent of the building's space was to become available for lease through 2013. Metropolitan refinanced the building in July 2008 with a bridge loan from Goldman Sachs. At the time, the building was 97 percent occupied, with only 13,800 ft^{2} (1,280 m^{2}) of vacant space available. Around two-thirds of the building was occupied by just one tenant, Latham & Watkins. Bernard L. Madoff Investment Securities, which occupied three stories, folded in 2008 after its chairman Bernie Madoff was found to have operated a $65 billion Ponzi scheme. Afterward, the Federal Bureau of Investigation took over part of Madoff's space while it was investigating charges of fraud against Madoff. Brokers expressed concerns that the building's connection with Madoff would drive away tenants. Rental income at 885 Third Avenue declined in subsequent years, partly as a result of the Madoff scandal, but also because of increased vacancy rates due to the 2008 financial crisis. Wolfgang's Steakhouse took over Vong's former space in the building in late 2009.

=== 2010s to present ===
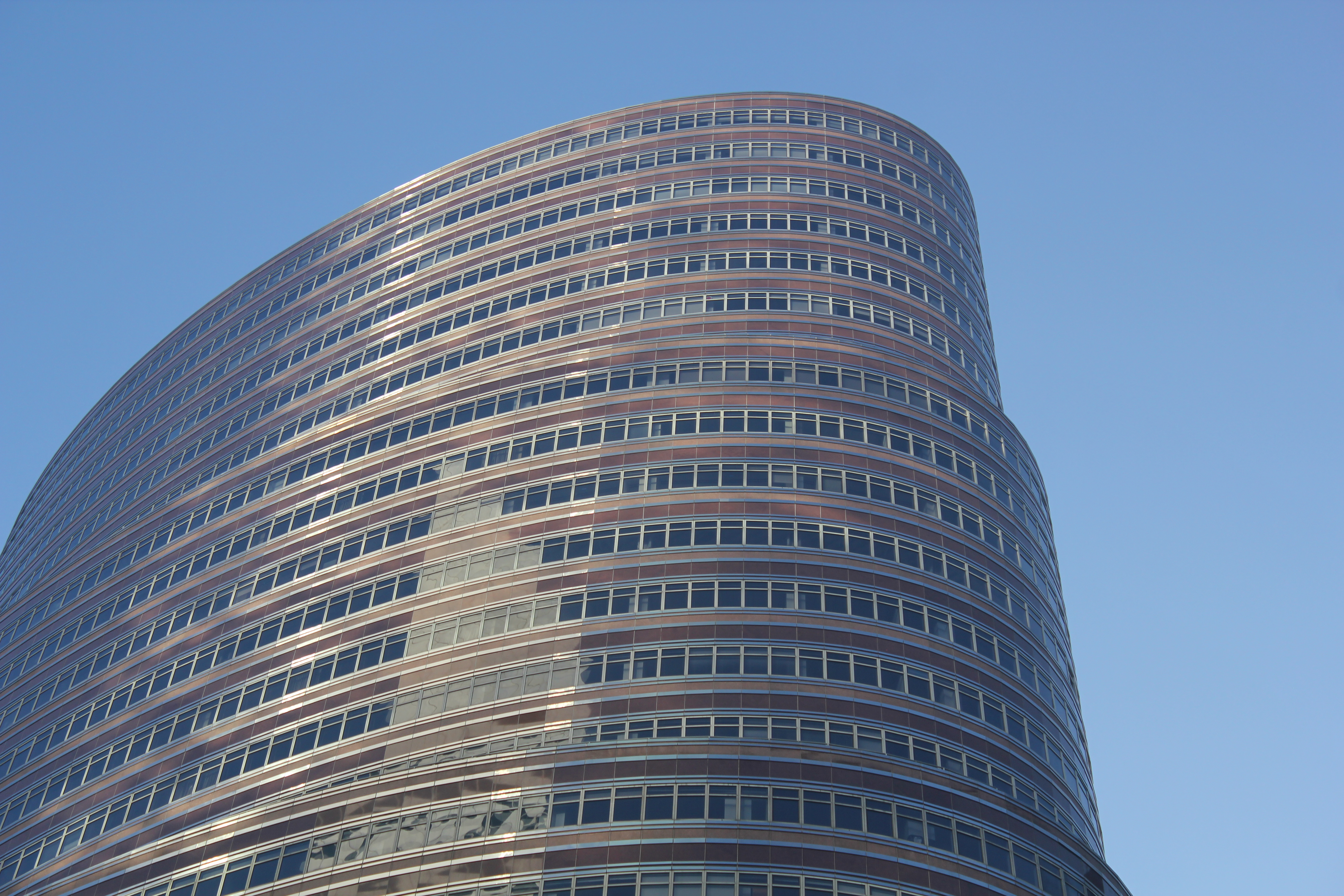
View of the setbacks atop the building

Metropolitan 885 Third Avenue LLC defaulted on its first mortgage loan in 2010, and RBC sued that June to foreclose on the building. Metropolitan filed for bankruptcy that November. Argentine group Inversiones y Representaciones Sociedad Anónima (IRSA) and the Marciano Investment Group acquired majority ownership of the building in a deal that valued the building at $395 million. SL Green consolidated its ownership of the underlying land, which was valued at $352 million. Despite the Madoff controversy, the building was still more than 90 percent occupied after IRSA and Marciano's acquisition. Law firm Reitler Kailas & Rosenblatt LLP became a tenant in 2009, initially leasing the 20th floor and expanding to the 21st floor in 2021.Some vacant office space was used for an art show in 2011, and the lobby hosted an exhibition on Philip Johnson's work the next year. A cafe opened within the building's lobby in 2010; it was replaced in 2014 by the Crimson & Rye restaurant, operated by chef Charlie Palmer. To attract tenants, IRSA and Marciano hired architectural firm Gensler to redesign some of the office space. The owners then leased out the space as prebuilt offices, each with a few thousand square feet.

Herald Square Properties, the building's managing agent, reported in 2014 that there was demand for full stories within the building. By the next year, the building was 97 percent leased, including all of Madoff's old space. SL Green sold a controlling stake in the ground lease to Ceruzzi Properties and SMI USA for $453 million in October 2015. The sale, which helped fund SL Green's purchase of 11 Madison Avenue, was finalized the next February. Ceruzzi, SMI USA, and SL Green owned 78.9 percent of the site, sharing the remainder with another owner. Ceruzzi leased the land back to IRSA and obtained a $272 million, four-year loan from Credit Suisse in 2017. The building continued to attract tenants such as hedge fund Alden Global Capital and law firm Noerr. Latham and Watkins announced in 2018 that it would relocate to 1271 Avenue of the Americas, vacating a majority of 885 Third Avenue's office space. Amid a weakening Argentine economy, IRSA and Marciano opted not to exercise their option to buy the land under 885 Third Avenue in 2019. Instead, Ceruzzi placed the land for sale the same year.

Due to the global COVID-19 pandemic in 2020, IRSA failed to make payments on the ground-lease loan, which was sent to a special servicer in June 2020. Further disputes arose when 3 Company LLC, which owned 21 percent of the site, attempted to raise the annual ground rent for its portion of the site fivefold, based on an appraisal conducted before the onset of the pandemic. SL Green filed a lawsuit claiming that the parcel had not been properly appraised. Ceruzzi narrowly avoided defaulting on the loan, which SL Green acquired in March 2021. Later that year, SL Green announced on Twitter that it would renovate the lobby; the firm had begun leasing out space in the building by early 2022. In September 2022, Memorial Sloan Kettering Cancer Center paid SL Green $300 million for 415,000 to 435,000 square feet (38,600 to 40,400 m^{2}), about two-thirds of the building's space. The lobby renovation, designed by MdeAS Architects, was completed in 2024. The Italian restaurant Mamo leased space on the 53rd Street side of the building in August 2025.

== Reception ==
Newsday cited 885 Third Avenue as an example of Johnson's "tangential approach", referencing an interview for PBS's American Masters television series in 1986, in which Johnson described his approach to architecture: "Sometimes you have to be tangent to the world or you'll go crazy." Vincent Scully wrote for The New York Times Magazine that the building was "whirly Houston type", either honoring the Southwest or referencing Third Avenue's reputation as a "frontier street". The New York Times compared the lobby of the nearby 666 Fifth Avenue, redesigned in the late 1990s, to the design of 885 Third Avenue. The Daily News wrote in 2012 that the building "isn't just an intriguing structure; it's a perfect example of modernist architecture". Curbed wrote in 2023 that the structure "has long served as a counterpoint to the blandness of the rest of Third Avenue".

Carter Wiseman described the building as "campy absurd" in an American Heritage article in which he criticized Johnson as the "most overrated architect". Michael Sorkin criticized the design, saying: "At the level of shape, the building is just fine, a good shape and distinct. But the project loses it in the details." Eric Nash wrote in 2005 that "discontinuity is emphasized at every level", from the columns at the base to the interior layout of the building.
