= Nörr =

Nörr may refer to:

- Nörr Stiefenhofer Lutz, the former name of Noerr
- Narfi, father of Nótt in Norse mythology
