= Vong (restaurant) =

Defunct restaurant in New York City, U.S.

- Interactive map of Vong

Restaurant information
- Established: 1992
- Closed: November 2009
- Food type: Southeast Asian
- Location: 200 East 54th Street, New York City, New York, 10022, United States
- Coordinates: 40°45′28.7″N 73°58′6.6″W

Vong was a restaurant in New York City. It was located in the Lipstick Building. The restaurant served Southeast Asian cuisine and had received a Michelin star, before closing in 2009.

== See also ==
- List of defunct restaurants of the United States
- List of Michelin-starred restaurants in New York City
