= Max Yankowitz =

American klezmer accordionist and recording artist (1875–1945)

Max Yankowitz מאַקס יאַנקאָװיטש
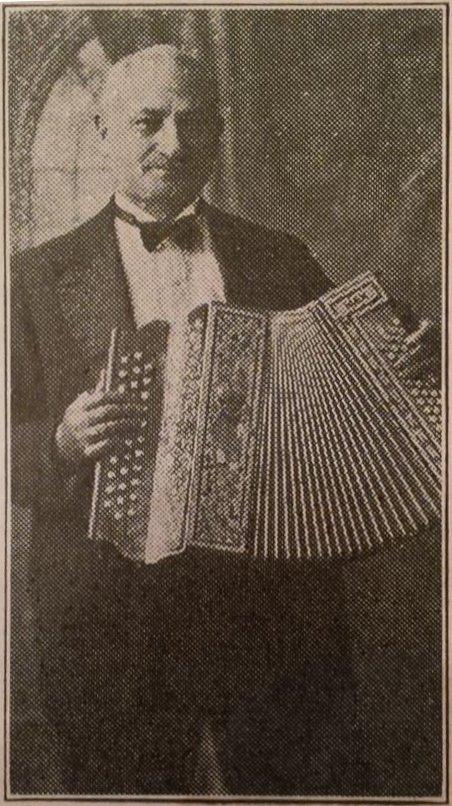

Background information
- Born: Meir Yankowitz; Bacău, Romania
- Origin: Romania
- Died: April 26, 1945 (aged 69–70) Bronx, New York City, U.S.
- Genre: Klezmer
- Occupation: Musician
- Instrument: Accordion
- Labels: Columbia Records; Emerson Records, Victor Recording Company
- Spouse: Gisela Lazarowitz

Max Yankowitz (1875–1945) or Yenkovitz (Yiddish: מאַקס יאַנקאָװיטש) was a Romanian-born American Klezmer accordionist and recording artist. He was one of the first musicians to record Klezmer music in the United States, making a handful of recordings for Columbia Records in 1913; he continued to record sporadically until around 1929.

== Biography ==
He was born Meir Yankowitz in Bacău, Romania on March 23 or 24, 1875. His parents were named Bernard and Hannah. Little is known about Yankowitz's early life or musical background. He emigrated to the New York area via Hamburg in June 1900. His first decade in New York is not well documented, but by the time of the 1910 census he gave his occupation as a wedding musician.

He made his first known recordings with Columbia Records in New York in April 1913. This set of 8 accordion recordings included Yiddish theatre music, Klezmer dances and Romanian music, and were made with the accompaniment of a cimbalom player named Goldberg. He applied for U.S. citizenship in 1918.

A decade later, in the summer of 1924, he entered the studios at Emerson Records and made another set of four recordings with piano accompaniment of klezmer violinist Abe Schwartz. In the mid-1920s he listed his occupation as a Restaurant Keeper. Although this side of his life is poorly documented, it is not surprising, as other Romanian-born klezmer musicians in New York including Joseph Moskowitz and Max Leibowitz also ran restaurants during this time.

He seems to have made his final set of four recordings, another set of Romanian-Jewish accordion solos with cimbalom accompaniment, for the Victor Recording Company in February 1929.

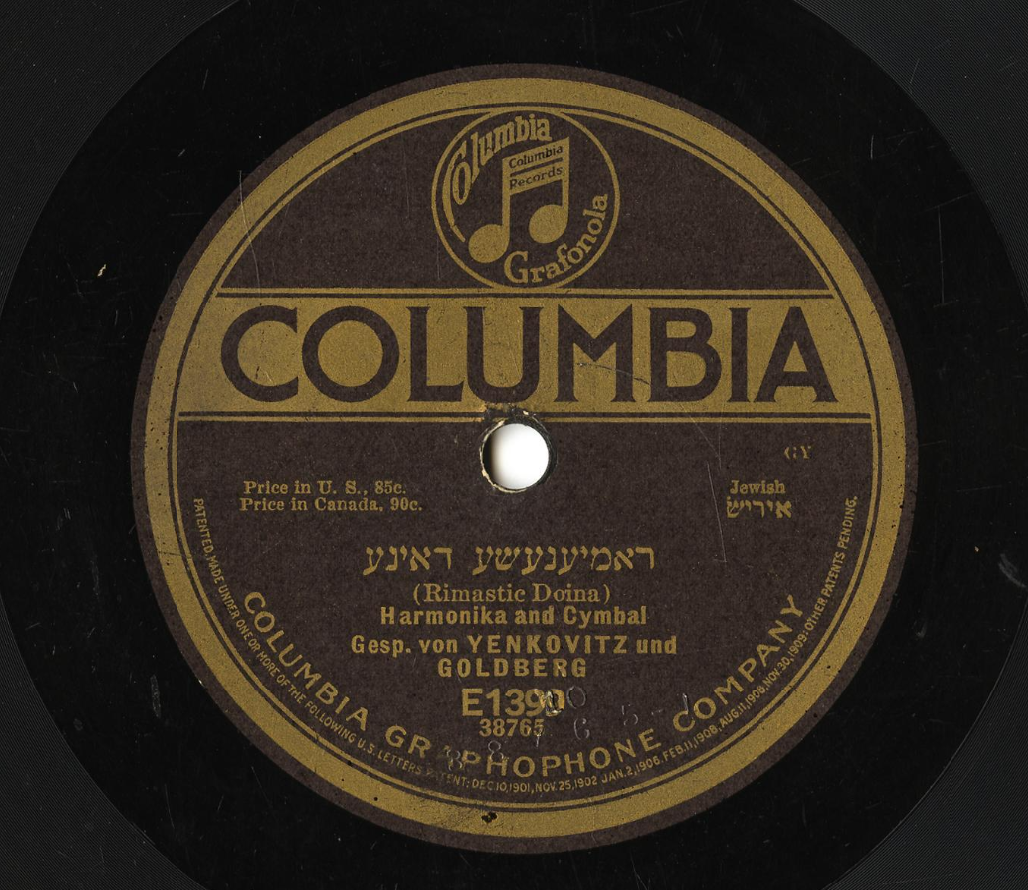
Max Yankowitz Rimastic Doina disc label

According to Klezmer researcher Joshua Horowitz, Yankowitz seems to have remained active as an accordionist until around 1937. Yankowitz died of a blood clot in the Bronx on April 26, 1945. He was 70 years old. He was buried in the Montefiore Cemetery in Queens in the section of the First Bucecer Independent Benevolent Association, a Landsmanshaft for immigrants from Buczacz.

== Family ==
Max's wife was named Gisela (née Lazarowitz) and was born in Romania in around 1878; they seem to have been married around the time they emigrated in 1900. Their children were Daniel (born in Romania or possibly New York c. 1900), Bessie (born in New York circa 1903), and Benjamin (born 1906). Daniel, who changed his family name to Yates, became a violinist and later relocated to Florida in the 1940s. Max's brother Morris also emigrated and worked as a factory worker in New York.

== Legacy ==
Beginning in the 1970s in the United States, there was renewed interest in old Jewish instrumental music which had fallen out of fashion for several decades—the Klezmer revival. Yankowitz's accordion recordings received new attention and appeared on a number of reissue albums, including Yikhes: klezmer Recordings from 1911-1939 (1995, Trikont). In particular, accordionists focused on his unusual technique which was partly due to the type of accordion he played and partly due to his idiosyncratic, rustic playing style. Because recordings of the Klezmer cimbalom from that era are also quite rare, the accompaniment on his tracks has also attracted attention.
