= New Klezmer Quintet =

American Klezmer band

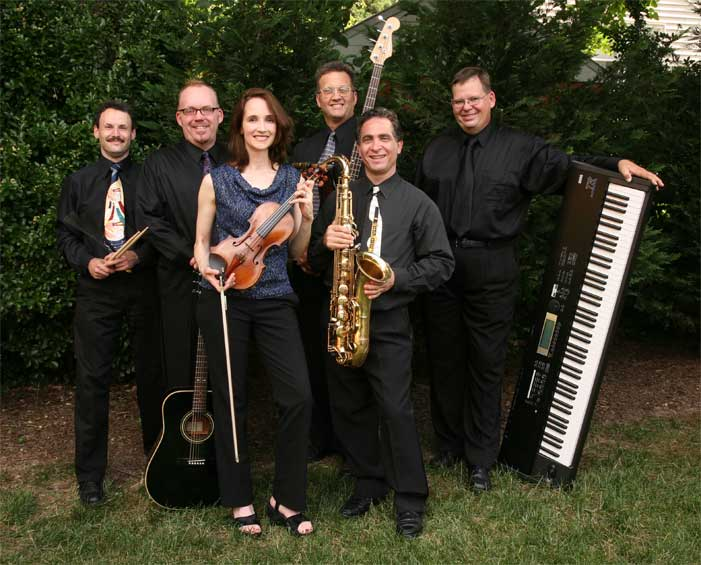
- New Klezmer Quintet band members, c2009; L.-R. Brian Choper, Chris Huntington, Judith Spokes Cho, Bill Hones, Fred Jacobowitz, Lou Durham

Background information
- Genres: Klezmer, rock, jazz
- Labels: Entertainment Connection

The New Klezmer Quintet is a traditional klezmer band originally from the Washington, D.C. area. The group is also a neo-klezmer ensemble performing klezmer music while incorporating elements of modern Israeli folk music, ladino, jazz, Swing music, Latin music, and rock and roll styles. The band was formed in 2001 at the Lansing Michigan Jazz Festival when a group of independent conservatory trained professional musicians with their own bands came together to jam. The New Klezmer Quintet has an older sister band called The Kol Haruach Orchestra which plays private events, while the main band plays strictly concert venues. Kol Haruach means voice of the spirit which embodies the groups improvisational and audience pleasing performance style.

Current members of the group are

- Brian Choper – Band manager and drummer
- Fred Jacobowitz – Clarinet and saxophone
- Judy Spokes Cho – Violin
- Lou Durham – Piano and keyboard
- Bill Hones – Bass

The group is rising to become one of the most highly esteemed klezmer bands in the country. According to agents, between their standards and the original music, the band is known to draw a multi-ethnic crowd of between 1000–1500 people per concert, easily selling out major shows. The group has performed at the Millennium Stage at The Kennedy Center, Martin Luther King Jr. Memorial Library, Strathmore Hall in Bethesda, Md., and the National Museum of the American Indian as well as benefit concerts at local synagogues. The group played in festivities for the first inauguration of Barack Obama and has been simulcast on NPR. Guest artists with the group have included accomplished cantors Phil Greenfield and Ramon Tasat.

The New Klezmer Quintet has the flexibility to sound like a klezmer band from the "old country" evoking images of the Jewish shtetl, a swing band tributing Duke Ellington, or a rock band covering Santana and The Village People. Most of all this group of creative artists love to write their own tunes, combining these various styles to make a brand new sound for today's audiences; sometimes called klezmer-rock.

== Discography ==
- 2004-In the Beginning...Bereshit; Entertainment Connection
- 2005-Kol Haruach-Live in Concert;Klezmer and Jazz-Together at Last; Entertainment Connection
- 2008-"Unexpected Joy"-The New Klezmer Quintet-Live in Concert w/ Ramon Tasat; Entertainment Connection
