= Brian Choper =

American musician

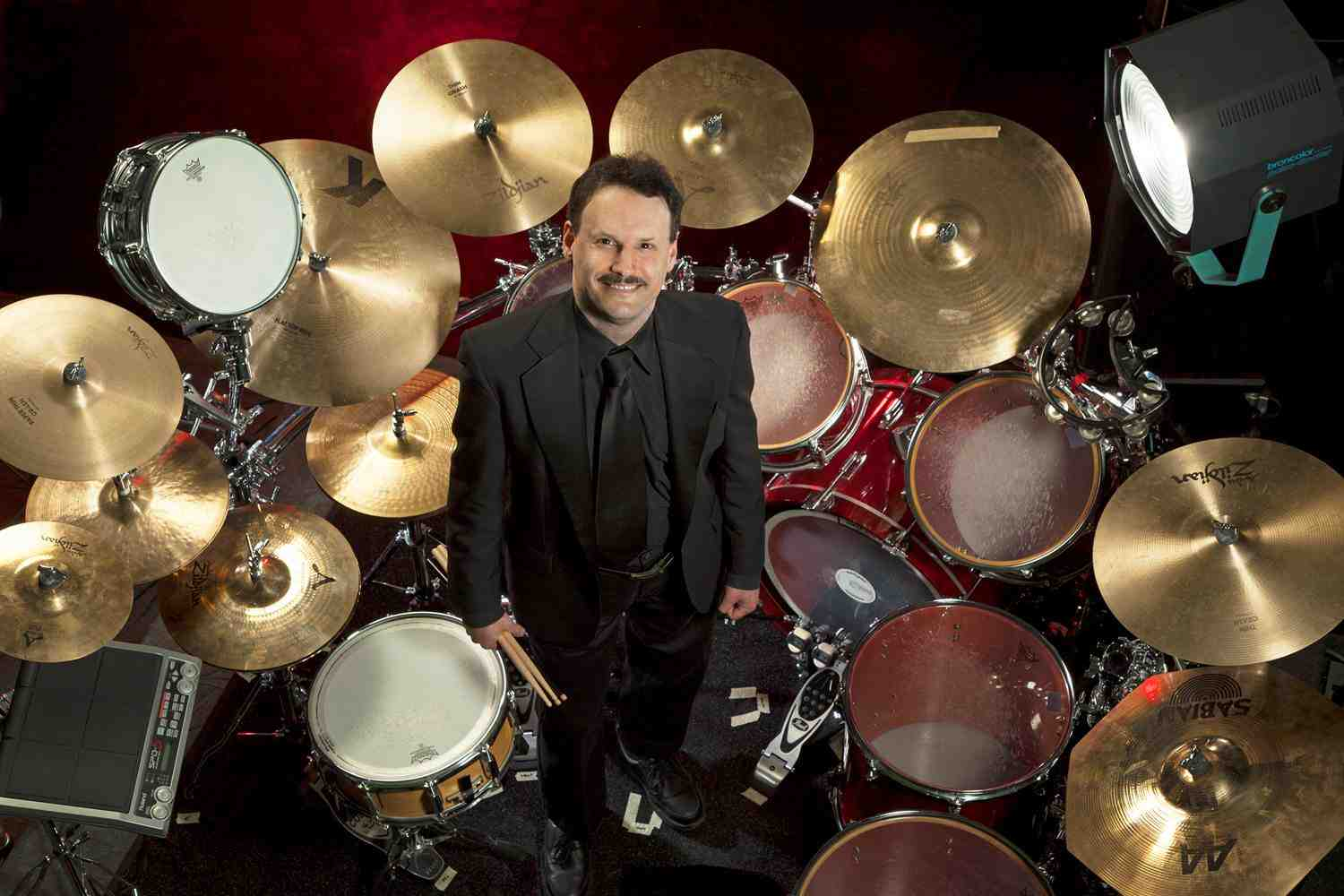
Brian Choper in 2014

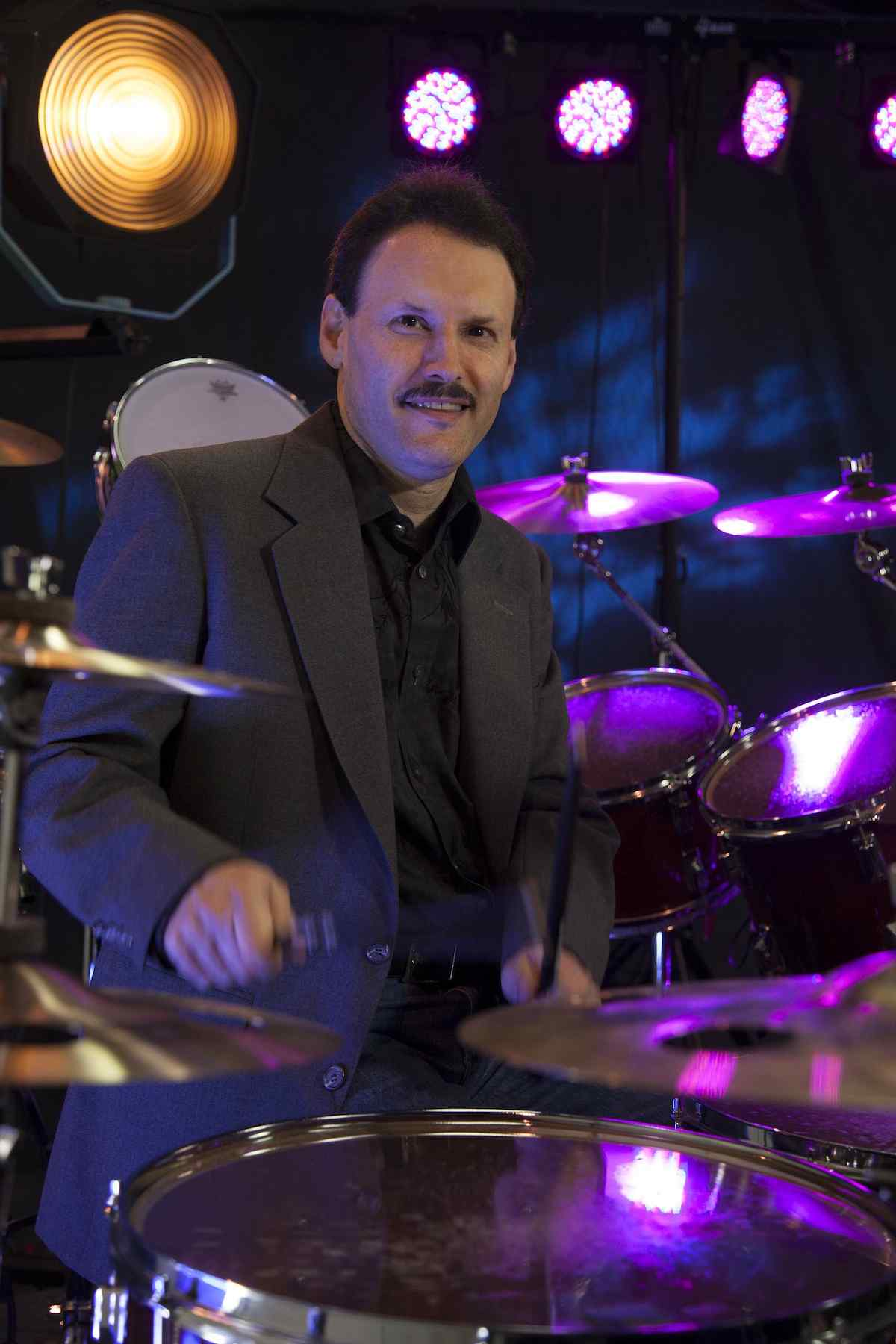
Brian Choper Performs

Brian Choper (born February 22, 1965, in Greenbelt, Maryland) is an American percussionist, band manager, and author. He has more than 30 years of experience playing both nationally and internationally, has been featured on nine CD's, authored an educational book on music management, and started his own entertainment management company, Washington's Entertainment Connection/Bigshot Records.

Choper manages and plays in five bands working in different genres, including jazz, rock, funk, klezmer and Israeli music. His groups include “Breathe“, “Kol Haruach Klezmer Band / Klezmer Voices“, “The Brian Choper Jazz Project with Peter Canella“, and “Mulberry Street”.

== Musical background ==
From the early 1980s through the late 1990s, Choper was primarily known as a klezmer and rock drummer. By the mid 1990s Choper had emerged as an American drummer, and later as a band manager, business owner and consultant. By the late 1990s, he was working with many bands in genres including rock, funk, jazz and Latin. In 1983, he won first prize at the Vienna International Music Festival for classical timpani. He studied with notable teachers including George Huttlin, Marshall Maley and Buddy Rich. During the 1980s, Choper became the first drummer to play with the folk band Capital Klezmers.

In 1992, he was selected to participate in the International Music Festival in Safed, Israel, as part of the Machaya Klezmer Band. He produced and is featured on the band's second CD titled What a Machaya! that became a best-selling folk album in 1997, reaching number two on the Moment magazine folk chart.

== Author and business leader ==
In 2002, Choper wrote the Entertainment Connection Career Guidebook, a manual for artists that outlines the steps for starting and managing a band and finding work as a professional musician. The book provides advice based on Choper’s years of experience as a performer, band manager, agent, consultant and business owner.

A year later, Choper founded Entertainment Connection, an artist management and booking firm where he could sign and manage artists and bands under his own wing. In 2005, the company became Washington's Entertainment Connection (WEC), a firm that not only manages and books artists and bands, but also coaches and develops them through his new label, Bigshot Records. The “Gigs For You” division advises artists and bands on how to find career opportunities.

In 2007, Choper expanded the Klezmer concept from the wedding and party scene to concert halls. To reach people of all ethnic backgrounds, he created a sister band to his original Kol Haruach Orchestra called the New Klezmer Quintet. The band regularly sells out major concert venues, performing traditional Klezmer music in its own style, while also presenting original, neo-Klezmer tunes that blend other musical genres, including rock, jazz and their most popular genre, bluegrass. This success led to the band performing for the 2009 Presidential Inaugural festivities in Washington, D.C., with performances simulcast on NPR.

Choper uses WEC's record label, Mulberry Music, to look for new and original musical talent to sign, develop and book on tour. The label's rock/pop/funk house band Mulberry Street blends (and is influenced by) rock, funk, blues, pop and other genres.

In the past, Choper has worked with major artists, including Prince, Buddy Rich, Louis Bellson, Sammy Davis Jr., Steve Marcus, Mel Torme, James Taylor, Jersey Boys, and Wynton Marsalis. Choper founded the project Gigs For Good. He is also owner of the BigShot Records Label, WEC, and Authority Records. All companies are music divisions under The Mulberry Music Group, of which Choper is a founding member. Choper is currently the founder and CEO of The Mulberry Music Musician’s Network.

== Discography ==
1993- Machaya Klezmer Band; Machaya Klezmer Band

1996-What a Machaya; Machaya Klezmer Band

2002-Tap Your Feet to a Jewish Beat; Sally Heckelman

2004-An Evening For You; The Jazz Connection

2004-In the Beginning ... Bereshit; The New Klezmer Quintet

2005-Kol Haruach-Live in Concert; Klezmer and Jazz-Together at Last; The Kol Haruach Klezmer Band

2008-"Unexpected Joy"-The New Klezmer Quintet-Live in Concert w/ Ramon Tasat; The New Klezmer Quintet
