= Therese Steinhardt Rosenblatt =

American painter

- Born: Therese Steinhardt; October 2, 1896
- Died: April 2, 1948 (aged 51)
- Known for: Painting
- Spouse: William Rosenblatt (m. 1920–1948)

Therese Steinhardt Rosenblatt (1896–1948), known professionally as Therese Steinhardt, was a 20th-century American painter. In 1948, the Metropolitan Museum of Art purchased her painting, "Lest We Forget" A work by the same name and artist was sold at auction in September 1993.

Steinhardt's first show was at the Edward Milch Gallery in New York City from 3 January to 13 January 1945. Writing in the New York Times, Howard Devree remarked on her works' "soundness and restraint," noted "suggestions of the Miller manner," but also "a distinct personal note to all her paintings." His verdict labeled it, "An unusually good first show." The show was extended beyond its initial closing date.

== Personal life ==
Born Therese Steinhardt, October 2, 1896, third child of Adolph Steinhardt and Addie Untermyer, the sister of Samuel Untermyer. Therese was the younger sister of Laurence Steinhardt. She married William Rosenblatt on October 6, 1920. They had three sons: Robert, Richard, and Peter. She died April 2, 1948.
