= Elie Rosenblatt =

Canadian klezmer violinist

Elie Rosenblatt (Hebrew: אלי רוזנבלט) is a klezmer violinist known for his interpretation and recreation of early nineteenth century klezmer violin style. Hailing from Canada, he immigrated to Israel where he is involved in klezmer performances with the Jerusalem Klezmer Association. He has performed and taught internationally, and had participated at the annual Klezkanada program from its inception. In 2001, Rosenblatt released his first CD with tsimbl player Pete Rushefsky entitled Tsimbl un Fidl: Klezmer Music for Hammered Dulcimer & Violin. The album was hailed as a work of "impeccable scholarship with virtuoso performances" and considered "essential in any klezmer collection".

Rosenblatt is a brother of renowned multi-instrumentalist and vocalist, Jason Rosenblatt.
