= Pete Rushefsky =

American klezmer musician

- Rushefsky in 2016
- Occupation: klezmer musician
- Notable work: Essentials of Klezmer 5-String Banjo, Volume I
- Awards: Bubbe Award for “Best Original Klezmer Composition”

Pete Rushefsky is an American klezmer musician and executive director of New York City's Center for Traditional Music and Dance. He plays the cimbalom or "tsimbl" as well as the 5-string banjo.

He has a book published called Essentials of Klezmer 5-String Banjo, Volume I.

In 2022, Rushefsky won a Bubbe Award for “Best Original Klezmer Composition”

== Discography ==
- Git Azoy (it's good this way) (2000?) with the 12 Corners Klezmer band
- Tsimbl un Fidl: Klezmer Music for Hammered Dulcimer and Violin (2001) with Elie Rosenblatt.
- Af di gasn fun der shtot - On the Streets of the City (2003) with Beyle Schaechter-Gottesman and others.
- On the paths: Yiddish songs with tsimbl (2004) with Becky Kaplan.
- Fleytmuzik in Kontsert (2008) with Adrianne Greenbaum and Jacob Shulman-Ment.
