= Daniel Hoffman (violinist) =

American musician and film producer

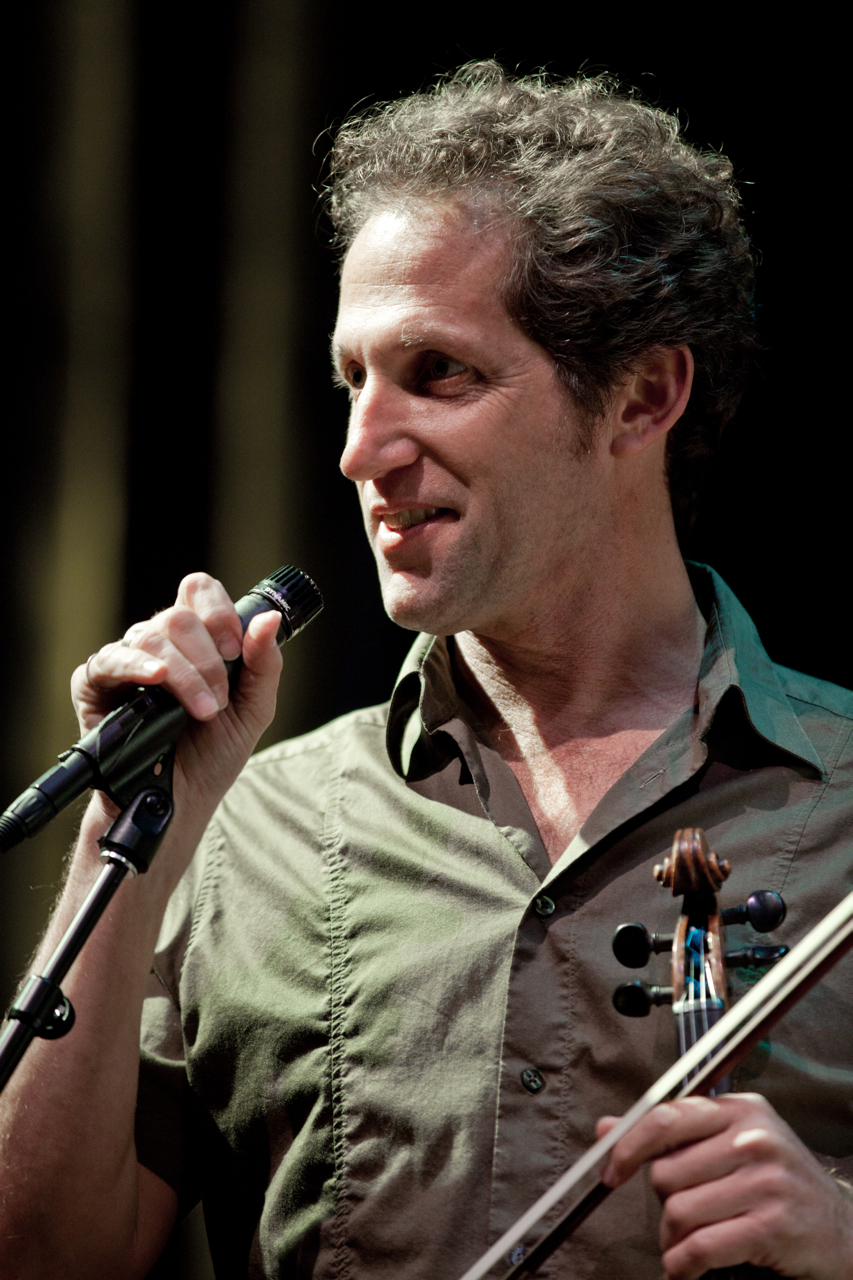
Violinist Daniel Hoffman

Daniel Warren Hoffman (Hebrew: דניאל הופמן) was an American-Israeli klezmer violinist, composer, and documentary film producer. He first heard klezmer music played on the piano by his father.

Hoffman was the founder of the klezmer-jazz fusion ensemble, the Klez-X and co-founder of Davka and Trio Carpion. He also performed with Di Tsaytmashin, Harel Shachal and the Ottomans, and with Ute Lemper in Songs for Eternity. He was the producer of the documentary film, Otherwise It’s Just Firewood, the pilot film for a television series that will explore the role of the Italianate violin in disparate cultures worldwide. Otherwise It's Just Firewood was aired widely on American PBS stations in 2018.

His private, classical teachers include Daniel Kobialka, Raphael Bronstein and Ariana Bronne. Daniel was a graduate of The Manhattan School of Music. He also studied and performed Arabic, Turkish, Greek, and Balkan music. He grew up in La Habra, California and relocated to Tel Aviv, Israel in 2005. He died in July 2025.

As a composer, he received composition grants from the National Endowment for the Arts, Meet the Composer, and numerous American theaters, including Theater J, the San Diego Repertory Theatre, and Traveling Jewish Theater.

== See also ==
· · · ·
