= H. Steiner =

Klezmer violinist

H. Steiner was a klezmer violinist who recorded for two discs of violin and cimbalom duets for the Gramophone Company in around 1909. Although he had a small musical output and his biography is mostly unknown, his recordings serve an important function for Klezmer revival musicians as they are rare examples of recorded European klezmer violin style.

== Biography and recorded output ==
Little is known about Steiner's life, although he is thought to have been from Lviv (Lemberg), Austria-Hungary. His recordings are part of a small set of known European klezmer violin recordings from the early 1900s, which also include Josef Solinski, Oscar Zehngut, and Leon Ahl. Steiner's recordings have a more distinctly religious musical element than those other artists and his style is thought to be the pre-twentieth century Klezmer violin style from Lemberg and Galicia more broadly. His two known records were Haneros Haluli/Mismor Schir Chanikas, which drew on Hanukkah themes, and Potpourri jüdischer Melodien. His recordings were later reissued in the United States by the Victor Recording Company. Those versions are listenable on Florida Atlantic University's Judaica collection.

== Legacy ==
The klezmer revival artist and scholar Walter Zev Feldman cited Steiner's recordings as a major inspiration for his work to revive the klezmer cimbalom style in the late 1970s. More recently, Feldman has done a deeper musical analysis of the Steiner recordings in his 2016 book Klezmer: Music, history, and memory.

As well, the Steiner recordings appeared on a number of klezmer reissue albums in the 1980s and 1990s, including Klezmer music (1910-1927): early Yiddish instrumental music (Folklyric, 1983), Oytsres: Klezmer music 1908-1996. (Wergo, 1999), and Klassic Klezmer (Goldies, 1999). His music has been reinterpreted by Klezmer revival artists such as Budowitz on Mother Tongue (Koch International, 1997), Khevrisa on European Klezmer Music (Folkways, 2000). The Hungarian group Muzsikás also reinterpreted one of his pieces on their CD Máramaros: Lost Jewish Music of Transylvania (Hannibal, 1993).
