= Reitler Kailas & Rosenblatt =

American law firm

Reitler Kailas & Rosenblatt LLP
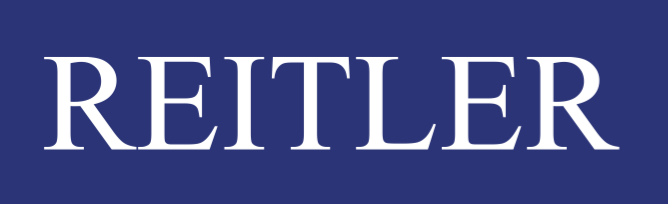
- Headquarters: New York City
- No. of offices: 3
- No. of attorneys: 53
- Major practice areas: Corporate, intellectual property, mergers and acquisitions, technology, venture capital
- Key people: Edward Reitler; Scott Rosenblatt; Brian Caplan
- Revenue: $28.6 million (est.)
- Date founded: 1995
- Company type: Limited liability partnership
- Website: www.reitlerlaw.com

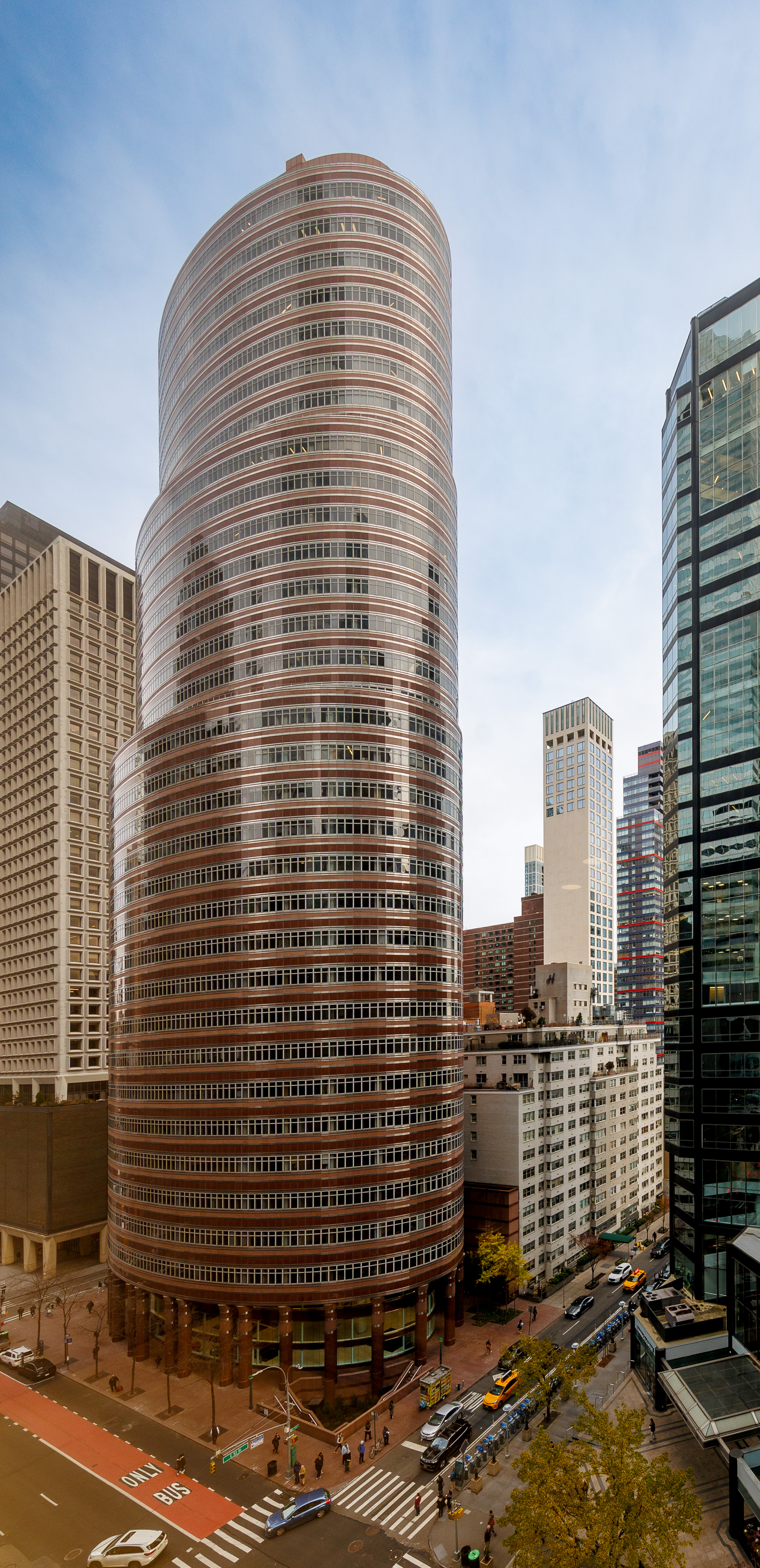
Reitler's New York City office at 885 Third Ave (Lipstick Building)

Reitler Kailas & Rosenblatt LLP, commonly known as Reitler, is a full-service boutique law firm headquartered in New York City. Its three senior partners are Ed Reitler, Scott Rosenblatt, and Brian Caplan. The firm is known for its practice in venture capital and private equity financings, fund formation, mergers and acquisitions, securities offerings, and intellectual property.

== History ==
Reitler was founded in New York City in 1995. In June 2010, the firm expanded with an office in Princeton, New Jersey. In July 2021, the firm opened its first West Coast office in the Los Angeles metropolitan area (Santa Monica), serving growing venture, entertainment, IP, and emerging company clients. To support its startup clients, the firm created Reitler Advisory Group in 2012, offering business consulting from "experienced investment bankers, private equity investors, serial entrepreneurs and venture capitalists."

Reitler’s main New York City office is located in the iconic Lipstick Building at 885 Third Avenue, one of Manhattan’s most architecturally distinctive addresses, designed by Philip Johnson and John Burgee. The 34-story postmodernist tower is home to major tenants including EuroConsult and Memorial Sloan Kettering

== Practice ==
Since its founding, Reitler has served as counsel in over 3,500 venture capital financings. The firm claimed US$4 billion in M&A transactions between 2021 and 2025. Its practice areas include—but are not limited to—venture capital, private equity and fund formation, securities and capital markets, M&A, IP and entertainment law, maritime law, real estate and hospitality, commercial litigation, executive compensation, taxation, and corporate governance.

== Office locations ==
Reitler maintains three offices, all located in the United States.

- New York, NY (headquarters, opened 1995)
- Princeton, NJ (opened 2010)
- Los Angeles, CA (opened 2021)

== Awards and rankings ==
Reitler is consistently ranked by Pitchbook as among the Top 10 venture capital law firms, both in the U.S. and globally. As of 2025, the firm had been nationally recognized over multiple years by Chambers and Partners for its practice in startups and emerging companies.
