= Joseph Moskowitz =

- Born: 1879; Galați, Romania
- Died: June 1954 (aged 74–75) Washington, D.C., United States
- Genres: Klezmer, Romanian folk music
- Occupations: musician, restaurant owner
- Instrument: cimbalom
- Labels: Victor Recording Company, Brunswick Records

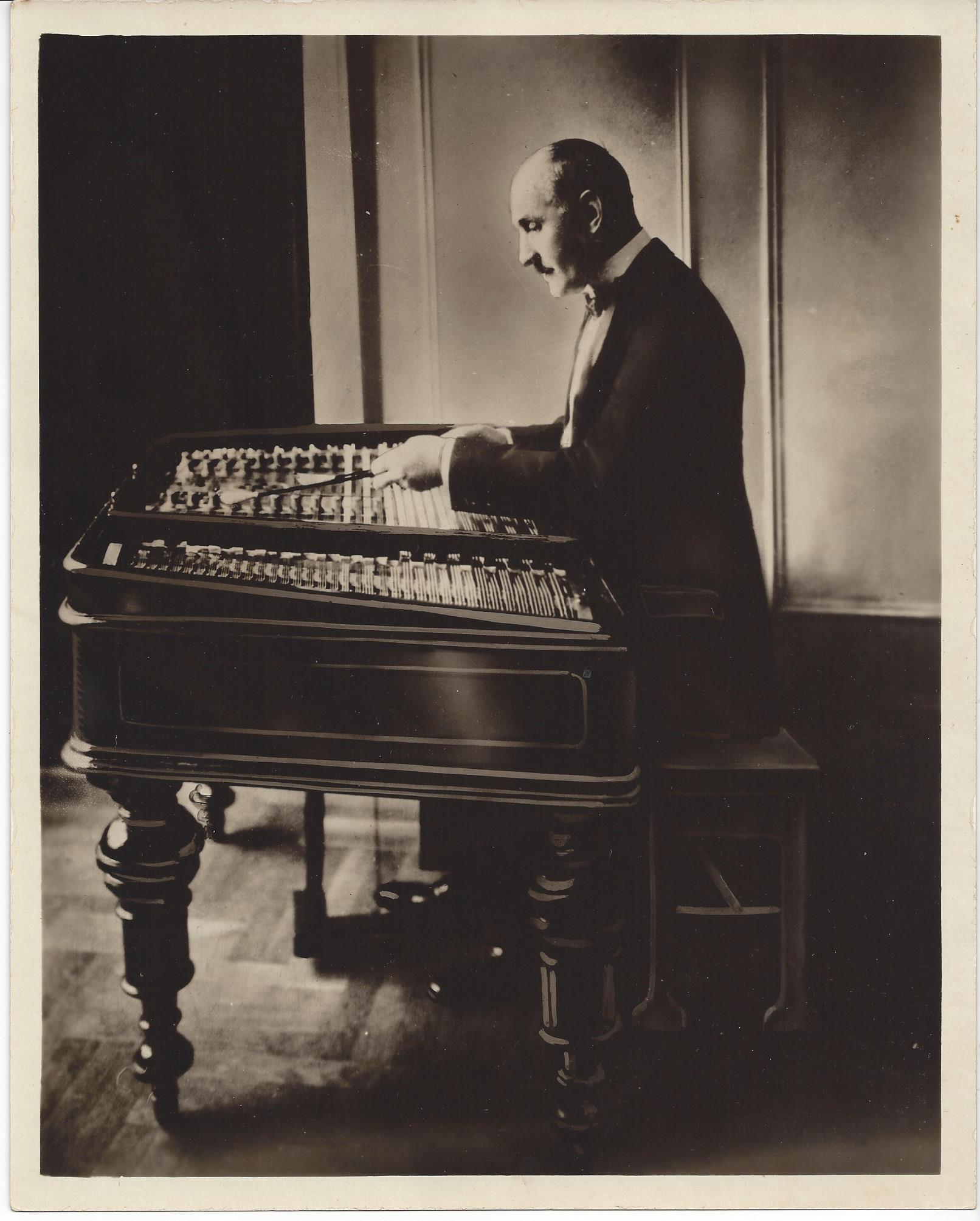
Joseph Moskowitz playing the cimbalom (c.1920s)

Joseph Moskowitz (Yiddish: יאָסעלע מאָשקאָװיטש, 1879 – June 1954) was an American cimbalom player, composer, restaurant owner and recording artist in New York City during the first half of the twentieth century. A descendant of a family of klezmer musicians, he was among the most well-known American cimbalom players of his time, and had a wide repertoire which included not only Jewish music but also Romanian, classical, and ragtime music. He is thought to have composed over 100 cimbalom pieces which drew upon various musical influences. His restaurant Moskowitz & Lupowitz, on Second Avenue also became a popular destination and celebrity hangout in the 1920s and 1930s.

== Biography ==
=== Early life ===
Moskowitz was born in Galați, Romania, in July 1879. His father Moses Moskowitz (nicknamed Moshe Tsimbler) was a klezmer musician and cimbalom player who was Joseph's first teacher. Joseph learned the cimbalom as well as the violin from his father. Another relative, Joseph's cousin nicknamed Jonah Tsimbler (Diamant) also became a cimbalom player. Joseph was a childhood friend of the writer Konrad Bercovici, also born in Galați. As a youth, Joseph toured Hungary, Romania, Galicia, and Istanbul, and played on river boats on the Danube. He apparently toured and performed with Broder singer troupes as well. He emigrated to the United States in December 1907 with his wife Rebecca, sailing from Bremen.

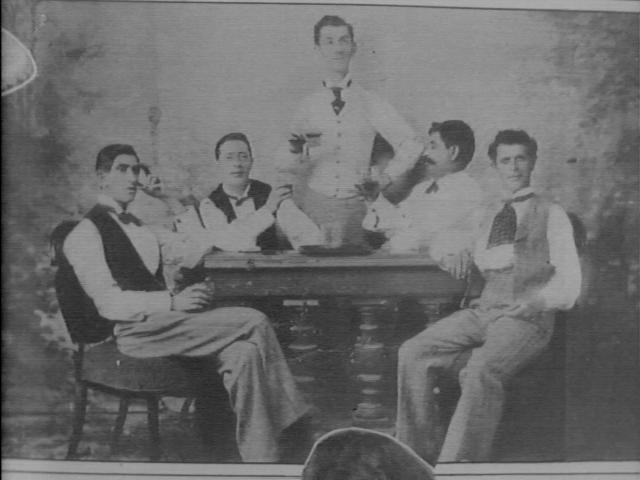
Studio portrait of Blondzhene shtern troupe c.1906 with Joseph Moskowitz standing in the back

=== Music and restaurant career ===
Moskowitz's original reason to travel to the United States was apparently an invitation to perform in Boston. After making appearances in cafés there and in New York, Moskowitz toured the United States for the next five years, often with the Matus Gypsy Ensemble or in hotel orchestras. That tour apparently did a lot to develop what would become his style and repertoire, which came to include not only Jewish and Romanian music but also international cosmopolitan repertoire and contemporary American music. At some point between 1909 and 1913 (sources disagree), he opened a restaurant, the Moskowitz Wine Cellar, on Rivington Street in Manhattan's Lower East Side. His wife was the cook. This restaurant was a narrow cellar lit by gas lamps, with pastoral Romanian scenes painted on the wall, where up to a hundred customers smoked and drank wine while listening to his playing. He became a Naturalized citizen of the United States in March 1915.

His recording career began in 1916, a time when the "ethnic" recording industry in New York was expanding aggressively. He recorded roughly 30 sides for Victor Records in 1916-7, including especially Romanian music, but also ragtime, klezmer, and various European and South American pieces. His recordings from that era were all made with piano accompaniment, usually by Max Yussim, who he occasionally performed in concert with as well. His wide performing repertoire and deep knowledge of Romanian music also apparently influenced other Jewish recording artists in the New York area, such as Dave Tarras.

He soon relocated to Houston Street and opened Little Rumania. The restaurant became quite popular, especially among Romanian Jews and young writers, and was soon expanded into the adjoining cellar to make room for the growing clientele. There, Moskowitz played his instrument, often sharing the stage with top violinists and pianists. Stephen Graham, a British writer who spent time in New York in the 1920s, wrote an account of a night he spent in Little Rumania. He said that earlier in the evening, Moskowitz circulated among the guests while a singer and pianist performed Yiddish and American numbers. Then, when the place was full, Moskowitz got on stage and performed various European folk numbers (Romanian, Hungarian, Russian, French) as well as some light classical music by Tchaikovsky and Brahms. It was only much later in the night that he would play dance tunes which were danced by a group of Jewish men.

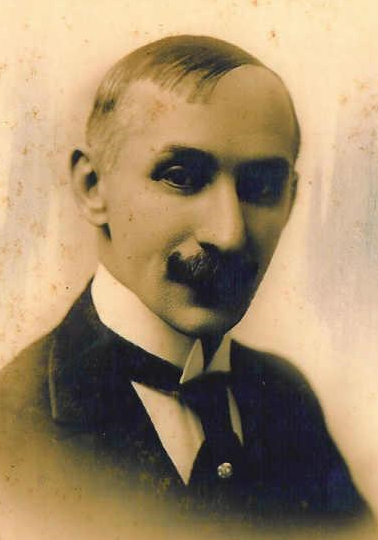
Joseph Moskowitz, c.1910s

He later opened a new restaurant on Second Avenue at Second Street called Moskowitz & Lupowitz. This new upscale restaurant began to attract celebrities, bohemians, and writers, including Jascha Heifetz, Eddie Cantor, Sid Caesar, Mischa Elman, Joseph Pulitzer, Abraham Reisen and H. L. Mencken. He continued to entertain his patrons with his music performances late into the night, as they ate the hearty Romanian Jewish cuisine.

In the 1920s Moskowitz regularly performed on the radio in the New York area, on stations such as WGBS, WEAF, and the WJZ network. These were often solo performances, but also often included accompaniment by his longtime pianist Max Yussim. The music he played on the radio often consisted of classical works or his own arrangements of Russian, Romanian and Jewish folk music. He also came to the attention of Samuel Roxy Rothafel and became an occasional featured artist of his popular "Roxy and the Gang" series. Moskowitz appeared on stage regularly in this era as well, including at Carnegie Hall and New York's Town Hall. Joseph remarried in March 1924 to his second wife Rose.

Although he recorded occasionally in the early 1920s, his next major phase of recording seems to have been in 1927-8, when he recorded a few more solo records and around 10 klezmer and Romanian pieces with Alexander Olshanetsky's orchestra on Brunswick Records, featuring Shloimke Beckerman on clarinet.

In the 1930s, Moskowitz continued to operate his restaurant and perform. He seems to have toured in Montreal in 1936. He is thought to have made an uncredited appearance playing his cimbalom in two restaurant scenes in Joseph Seiden's 1939 Yiddish language talkie Der Lebediker Yosem (The Living Orphan). Moskowitz finally left New York in around 1940. He had a dispute with Lupowitz and decide to sell his share in the restaurant. Louis Anzelowitz, who had been a butcher in the restaurant, bought Joseph's shares and eventually became the sole owner, operating it until 1966. Under the new management, the restaurant kept the Moskowitz & Lupowitz name and continued to attract celebrities.

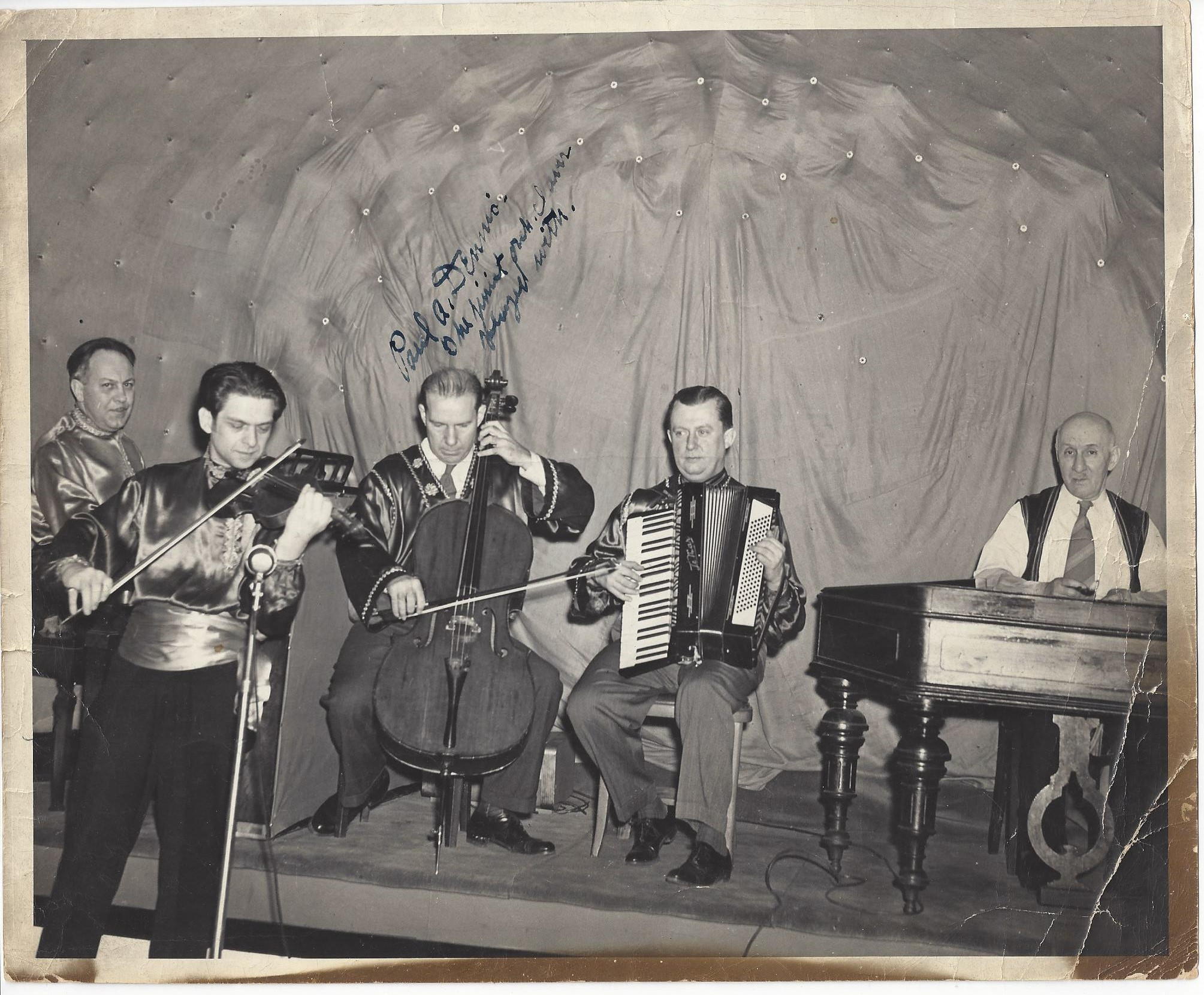
Joseph Moskowitz and musicians in Washington, D.C., circa 1950

After leaving New York, Moskowitz lived in Akron, Ohio starting in around 1940, playing concerts at the Jewish Center there and in the Romany Restaurant. He also continued to compose new music while in Akron, sometimes under the name Joseph Moss. By 1943, he left Akron and relocated to Washington, D.C. In Washington, Joseph played regularly at Michel's French Restaurant near Dupont Circle from 1943 until his death. His final recording session in Washington in 1953 was released as a 10-inch record, Cymbalom Melodies, on Romany Records. It was recorded at Michel's Restaurant with Bela Hargy accompanying him on piano, and consisted mainly of Romanian music. (Selections from that album, along with many of his earlier recordings, were reissued by Rounder Records in 1996 on the cd The Art Of The Cymbalom: The Music Of Joseph Moskowitz 1916–1953)

He died of heart problems at George Washington University Hospital in Washington, D.C., on June 27, 1954; he was 76 years old. He was buried in the Mount Lebanon Cemetery in Adelphi, Maryland.

== Popular culture ==
Moskowitz and his restaurant appeared in a number of memoirs and novels in his time, including New York Nights (1927) by Stephen Graham, Jews without Money (1930) by Mike Gold, Dust of New York (1919) by his childhood friend Konrad Bercovici, and Gershn in Amerike (1963) by Chaver-Paver (Gershon Aynbinder).

Moskowitz claimed to have composed over 100 pieces during his life, although it is unclear how many were adaptations of existing folk melodies. During the Klezmer revival of the late 1970s and 1980s, there was renewed interest in finding, reissuing and reinterpreting old recordings of Jewish music. Interpretations of his recordings and compositions were made by groups such as the Klezmer Conservatory Band, The Klezmatics and the Flying Bulgar Klezmer Band. Moskowitz's original tracks also appeared on a number of reissue compilations over the years, including Classic Ragtime (RCA Victor/BMG, 1998), Klezmer Pioneers: European and American Recordings, 1905-1952 (Rounder Records, 1993), From Avenue A to the Great White Way (Columbia Records, 2002), Klezmer Music: Early Yiddish Instrumental Music: 1908-1927 (Arhoolie Records, 1997), as well as an entire reissue CD dedicated to his recordings: The Art of the Cymbalum (Rounder Records, 1996).
