= Noerr =

German law firm

Noerr Partnerschaftsgesellschaft mbB
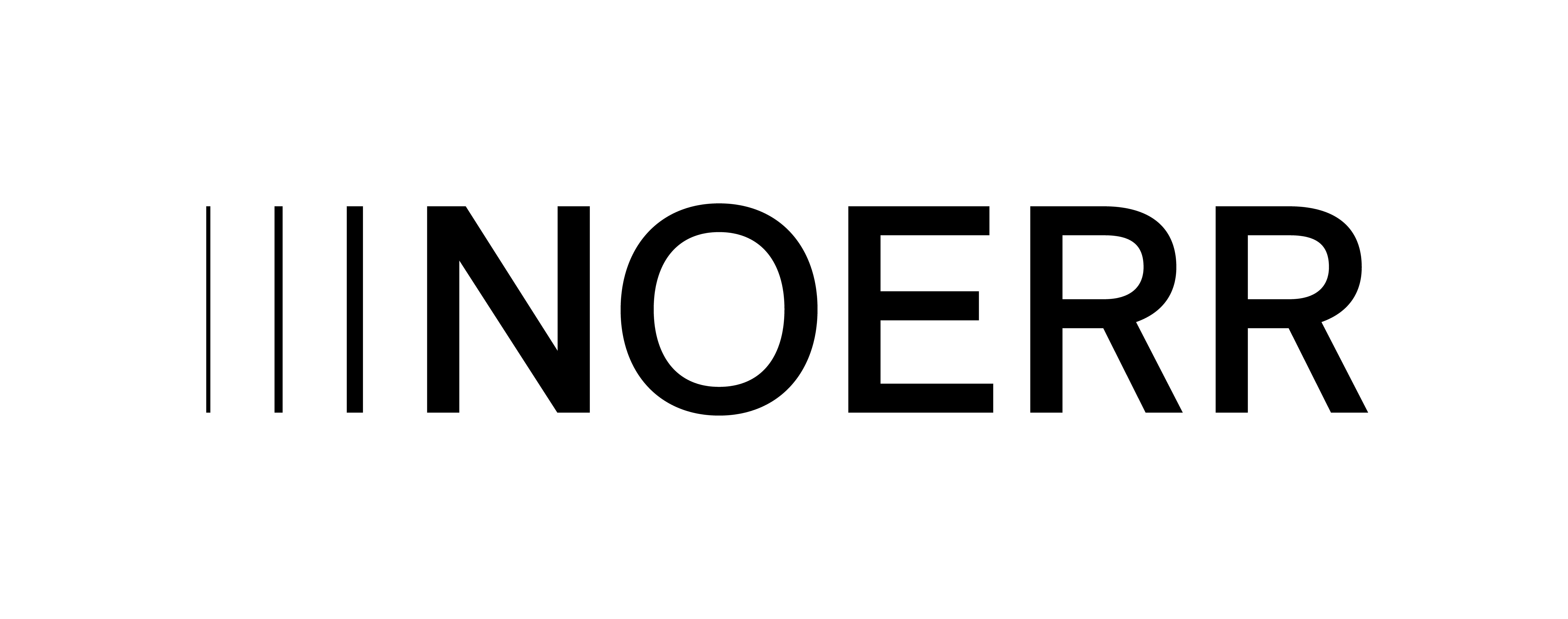
- Headquarters: (Germany) Munich, Bavaria
- No. of offices: 10
- No. of attorneys: 450 (2026)
- No. of employees: approx. 1000
- Major practice areas: Legal advice, tax consulting, financial advisory, consulting
- Revenue: €328,4 million (2025)
- Date founded: 1950
- Founder: Eduard Oehl
- Company type: Partnerschaftsgesellschaft
- Website: noerr.com

Noerr is a business law firm with approximately 450 attorneys, tax advisors, and certified public accountants across 10 offices in Germany, Europe, and the United States.

== International connections ==
Noerr is one of the few large independent commercial law firms in Germany. The firm has grown largely without mergers. As the second-largest German commercial law firm in Europe, Noerr advises and represents clients on matters of commercial law, including tax advice. Noerr operates its own offices in Alicante, Berlin, Brussels, Dresden, Düsseldorf, Frankfurt am Main, Hamburg, London, Munich, and New York. At the international level, Noerr collaborates with partner firms and is a member Lex Mundi, an association of independent law firms, with more than 160 member firms worldwide. The firm also provides multicultural BRIC Desks which operate out of its German offices.

== History ==
In 1950, attorney Eduard Oehl opened a law firm in Munich, Germany.[3] In 1956, Rudolf Nörr (1929–2020) joined the firm as a partner, followed by Alfred Stiefenhofer (1931–2022) in 1959. Starting in 1983, the partnership operated under the names of the senior partners as “Nörr Stiefenhofer Lutz.” Ulrich Lutz had joined the firm in 1969. [7] When supra-regional law firms were permitted in Germany in 1989, the partnership opened an office in Frankfurt am Main, Germany. Following the fall of the Berlin Wall, the firm established an office in Dresden in the spring of 1990, making it the first West German law firm to open a location in East Germany.[8] That same year—again as the first law firm to do so—offices were opened in Budapest (Hungary) and Prague (Czech Republic). The strategic expansion into Eastern Europe continued with Warsaw (Poland) in 1992; a year later, the office at the Gendarmenmarkt in Berlin was opened. In 1994, an office was opened in Moscow (Russia), which was taken over in January 2022 by the local office head and other attorneys.[9]

Additional offices were opened in Bucharest (Romania) in 1998, Düsseldorf (Germany) in 1999, and Bratislava (Slovakia) in 2004. Noerr has been represented in New York (USA) since 2005, followed in 2007 by Kyiv, where the office became independent in 2013 under the name Nobles. [1] In 2010, the firm opened an office in London (UK), changed its legal form to a Limited Liability Partnership, and changed its name to “Noerr.”[2] Noerr has been present in Alicante (Spain), the headquarters of the European Union Intellectual Property Office, since 2011. Since 2014, Noerr has also been represented by its own office in Brussels (Belgium). In 2017, another office opened in Hamburg (Germany). As a result of Brexit, the firm changed its legal form to a partnership with limited professional liability (Noerr Partnerschaftsgesellschaft mbB) effective December 31, 2020. [3]

In 2024, Noerr withdrew from Eastern Europe. The offices in Bratislava, Bucharest, and Prague were taken over by the law firm Kinstellar, while the offices in Budapest and Warsaw were acquired by local partners through management buyouts.[4]

== Recognition and awards ==
Recent awards and accolades for Noerr include:

- European Law Firm of the Year (The Lawyer European Awards 2012)
- Law Firm of the Year for Banking & Finance; Restructuring; and Distribution (JUVE Awards 2012)
- Client Service Law Firm of the Year (Chambers Europe Awards for Excellence 2012 & 2010)
- ILO Client Choice Award for Germany (International Law Office 2012 & 2011)
- "Highly commended" International Law Firm of the Year (Legal Business Awards 2012)
- Ranked among the top four of Germany’s most popular legal employers in the latest azur100 top employer survey for young lawyers (azur 100 Magazine 2012)
- Best German Law Firm (International Legal Alliance Summit & Awards 2011, 2010 & 2009)
- Finalist for the European Law Firm of the Year Award (British Legal Awards 2011)
- M&A Law Firm of the Year and Dispute Resolution Law Firm of the Year (JUVE Awards 2010)*
- Litigation Law Firm of the Year in Germany (Global Law Experts Awards 2010)
