= Jason Rosenblatt =

Canadian multi-instrumentalist (born 1973)

Jason Rosenblatt (born 1973) is a Canadian multi-instrumentalist and vocalist best known for his unique work on the diatonic harmonica. A protege of Howard Levy, he uses advanced techniques such as overblowing and overdrawing to play in a variety of different styles on the diatonic harmonica. Rosenblatt is a founding member of the neo-Jewish music group Shtreiml, which he formed in 2001 alongside collaborators Josh Dolgin, Thierry Arsenault and Ariel Harrod. The group's early albums, Harmonica Galitzianer (2002) and Spicy Paprikash (2004) heavily feature Rosenblatt's virtuosic, crisp clean work on the diatonic harmonica performed almost exclusively in a Klezmer or Eastern-European context. Later Shtreiml albums, Fenci's Blues (2006) and Eastern Hora (2014), recorded in collaboration with Turkish oud master Ismail Hakki Fencioglu, showcase Rosenblatt's compositional prowess as he blends elements of traditional Eastern-European and Ottoman music with a mixture of jazz, rock and funk. On his 2015 release, "Wiseman's Rag," Rosenblatt steps away from Shtreiml's Jewish music bent and instead focuses on roots, blues and jazz music. The thirteen original compositions are a mix of ragtime, jazz and blues and feature Rosenblatt on his familiar harmonica, but also on piano, organ and vocals. Rosenblatt's music can be heard in the 2017 CBC documentary "Kosher Love" and the 2019 PBS documentary "A People's Soundtrack."

== Discography ==
Recordings as Leader/Co-Leader

- “Har Meron” Shtreiml. 2020
- “Mizmor” Tevet Sela and Jason Rosenblatt. 2018
- “Brass Fabulous” Jason Rosenblatt & Orkestra Severni. 2017
- “Wisman’s Rag.” Jason Rosenblatt. 2015
- “Eastern Hora.” Shtreiml. 2014
- “Soldier Woman.” Jump Babylon. 2012
- “D’Harmo.” D’Harmo. 2011
- What’s New Bobenyu?” Abigail Rosenblatt. 2008
- “Fenci’s Blues.” Shtreiml. 2006
- “Spicy Paprikash.” Shtreiml. 2004
- “Harmonica Galitzianer: Klezmer Music for the Diatonic Harmonica.” Shtreiml. 2002
