= Lisa Gutkin =

American violinist, singer and songwriter

Lisa Gutkin is an American violinist, singer and songwriter of The Klezmatics. She played in Sting's The Last Ship, had a cameo appearance in “Sex and the City,” and is a MacDowell Fellow at the MacDowell Colony. Lisa appears on hundreds of recordings including From Here On In, a CD of her original songs produced by John Lissauer, and Play Klezmer Fiddle!, an instructional DVD. She has co-authored songs with Woody Guthrie, Anne Sexton, and Maggie Dubris, and composed for symphony orchestra, dance, and film. She is the Co-Music Director and Co-Composer for the Broadway show "Indecent (play)" which won 2 Tony Awards for Best Direction of a Play and Best Lighting Design of a Play in 2017.

== Career ==
Gutkin specializes in bluegrass, Klezmer, and Irish folk genres. She holds a Bachelor of Music in classical violin from the Aaron Copland School of Music at Queens College.

In 2002, Gutkin joined The Klezmatics with the release Rise Up! Shteyt Oyf! and remains a performing and composing member, notably having written the music for the acclaimed track off Wonder Wheel, "Gonna Get Through This World". This album would win The Klezmatics a Grammy Award for Best Contemporary World Music Album in 2007. Gonna Get Through This World was also notably performed with Arlo Guthrie at Carnegie Hall during Thanksgiving of 2004 at “The Annual Holiday Concert: Arlo Guthrie with Special Guest the Klezmatics and Abe Guthrie, Sarah Lee Guthrie and Johnny Irion.”.

Gutkin has performed and/or recorded with John Cale, Rod MacDonald, Jane Siberry and the Irish artists Tommy Sands and Cathie Ryan.

Gukin also composed for the 2017 short film, Summer, written and directed by Pearl Gluck, and is the composer for Gluck's 2019 film, Write Me, written by Pearl Gluck and Deborah Kahan Kolb.

In 2019, Gutkin produced and recorded on Indecent (Original Broadway Cast Recording). Released by Yellow Sound Label on January 28, 2019, the album featured the return of the original Broadway cast for a full recording of all the compositions of Indecent and was produced by Gutkin herself, Michael Croiter, and Aaron Halva.

== Partial discography ==
=== The Klezmatics (Albums which feature Lisa Gutkin) ===
Year	Project	Label
2011	Live at Town Hall	Soundbrush Records
2008	Tuml = Lebn: The Best Of The First 20 Years	Piranha Records
2006	Woody Guthrie's Happy Joyous Hanukkah	JMG Records
2006	Wonder Wheel (Lyrics by Woody Guthrie)	JMG Records
2004	Brother Moses Smote the Water with Joshua Nelson & Kathryn Farmer	Piranha Records
2002	Rise Up! Shteyt Oyf!	Rounder Records

=== Indecent Original Broadway Cast ===
Year	Project	Label
2019	Indecent (Original Broadway Cast Recording)	Yellow Sound Label

=== Lisa Gutkin ===
Year	Project	Label
2016	From Here On In	Independent

=== Whirligig ===
Year	Project	Label
2003	Live at the IMT	Quarktet
2000	Spin	Quarktet
1996	The Wheel	Quarktet
1992	WHIRLIGIG	Quarktet

=== Rod MacDonald (Albums which feature Lisa Gutkin) ===
Year	Project	Label
1997	Live at the Uptown Coffeehouse	Gadfly Records
1997	And Then He Woke Up	Gadfly Records
1994	Man on a Ledge	Shanachie Records
1992	Highway to Nowhere	Shanachie Records
1989	Bring on the Lions	Brambus Records

=== Richard Meyer (Albums which feature Lisa Gutkin) ===
Year	Project	Label
2000	Bitter Moon/Strange Generosity	Independent
1994	A Letter From The Open Sky	Shanachie Records
1992	The Good Life	Shanachie Records

== Filmography ==
Year	Project	Role	Director
2019	Write Me (Short Film) (Post-production)	Composer	Pearl Gluck
2018	Indecent Great Performances	Co-Composer, Musician	Rebecca Taichman
2018	Summer (Short Film)	Composer	Pearl Gluck
2010	The Klezmatics: On Holy Ground	Appeared as herself	Erik Greenberg Anjou
1997	Sax and Violins	Appeared as violinist	Nye Heron
