= Jews with Horns =

Jews With Horns

Studio album by The Klezmatics
- Released: 1995
- Genre: Klezmer
- Label: Xenophile/Green Linnet

The Klezmatics chronology
Rhythm and Jews (1990)	Jews With Horns (1995)	Possessed (1997)

Professional ratings
Review scores
Source	Rating
AllMusic	3/5 stars
Robert Christgau	A–

Jews With Horns is the third album by the American klezmer band the Klezmatics, released in 1995. It is the first album on which Matt Darriau performed, which led to his induction as a full member of the group. Marc Ribot is featured on the second track, "Fisherlid".

== Critical reception ==
The Washington Post thought that "the Klezmatics are capable of the slow, lovely, horn-and-violin harmonies of the traditional 'Romanian Fantasy' or the exuberant Hasidic vocals of 'Nign'."

AllMusic wrote that "the fast numbers ... are frenzied celebratory drinking songs—a true revival of the community spirit which spawned this eastern European brand of folk music."

== Track listing ==
1. Man in a Hat
2. Fisherlid
3. Khsidim tants
4. Simkhes-toyre
5. Romanian Fantasy
6. Bulgars / The Kiss
7. Nign
8. Honga
9. In Kampf
10. Doyna
11. Freyt aykh, yidlekh
12. Kale bazetsn
13. Heyser tartar-tants
14. Es vilt zikh mir zen
15. Overture

== Personnel ==
Frank London - trumpet, cornet, alto horn, piano, organ, vocals
Lorin Sklamberg - accordion, piano, lead vocals
Paul Morrissett - bass, vocals
David Licht - drums
David Krakauer - clarinet, bass clarinet, vocals
Alicia Svigals - violin, vocals
Ray "Chinito" Diaz - guiro (Track 1)
Moxy Früvous - backing vocals (1)
Matt Darriau - alto saxophone (2, 15), backing vocals (4)
Marc Ribot - electric guitar (2)
Betty Silberman - backing vocals (2)
Adrienne Cooper - vocals (14)
