= Rhythm and Jews =

Studio album by The Klezmatics
- Released: 1993
- Genre: Klezmer
- Label: Flying Fish

The Klezmatics chronology
Shvaygn = toyt (1989)	Rhythm and Jews (1993)	Jews with Horns (1995)

Professional ratings
Review scores
Source	Rating
AllMusic	4.5/5 stars
Robert Christgau	B+
The New Rolling Stone Album Guide	3.5/5 stars

Rhythm and Jews is an album by American klezmer group The Klezmatics. It was released in 1993 via Flying Fish.

The album includes many traditional melodies of the hassidic repertoire and of the repertoire of the 1920s first generation American klezmer pioneer Naftule Brandwein.

== Critical reception ==
The Washington Post wrote that the album contains "traditional klezmer tunes with very American syncopation, blue notes and rhythmic punch."

== Track listing ==
1. Fun Tashlikh
2. NY Psycho Freylekhs
3. Di Sapozhkelekh
4. Clarinet Yontev
5. Araber Tants
6. Di zun vet Aruntergeyn
7. Tsiveles Bulgar
8. Violin Doyna
9. Honikzaft
10. Bulgar A La Klezmatics
11. Shnirele Perele

Klezmatic Fantasy: A Suite Mostly In D:
12. I. Der yidisher soldat in di trenches
13. II. Bukoviner Freylikhs
14. III. Buhusher Khosid
15. IV. Terkish-Bulgarish

== Personnel ==
Frank London - trumpet, cornet, keyboards, vocals
Lorin Sklamberg - accordion, keyboards, lead vocals
Paul Morrissett - bass, vocals
David Licht - drums
David Krakauer - clarinet, bass clarinet
Alicia Svigals - violin, vocals
Mahmoud Fadl - percussion (Track 1)
Alan Bern - accordion (2)
Tine Kinderman - backing vocals (4, 11)
Christoph Herrman - backing vocals (4)
