= Jacqueline Semha Gmach =

American educator

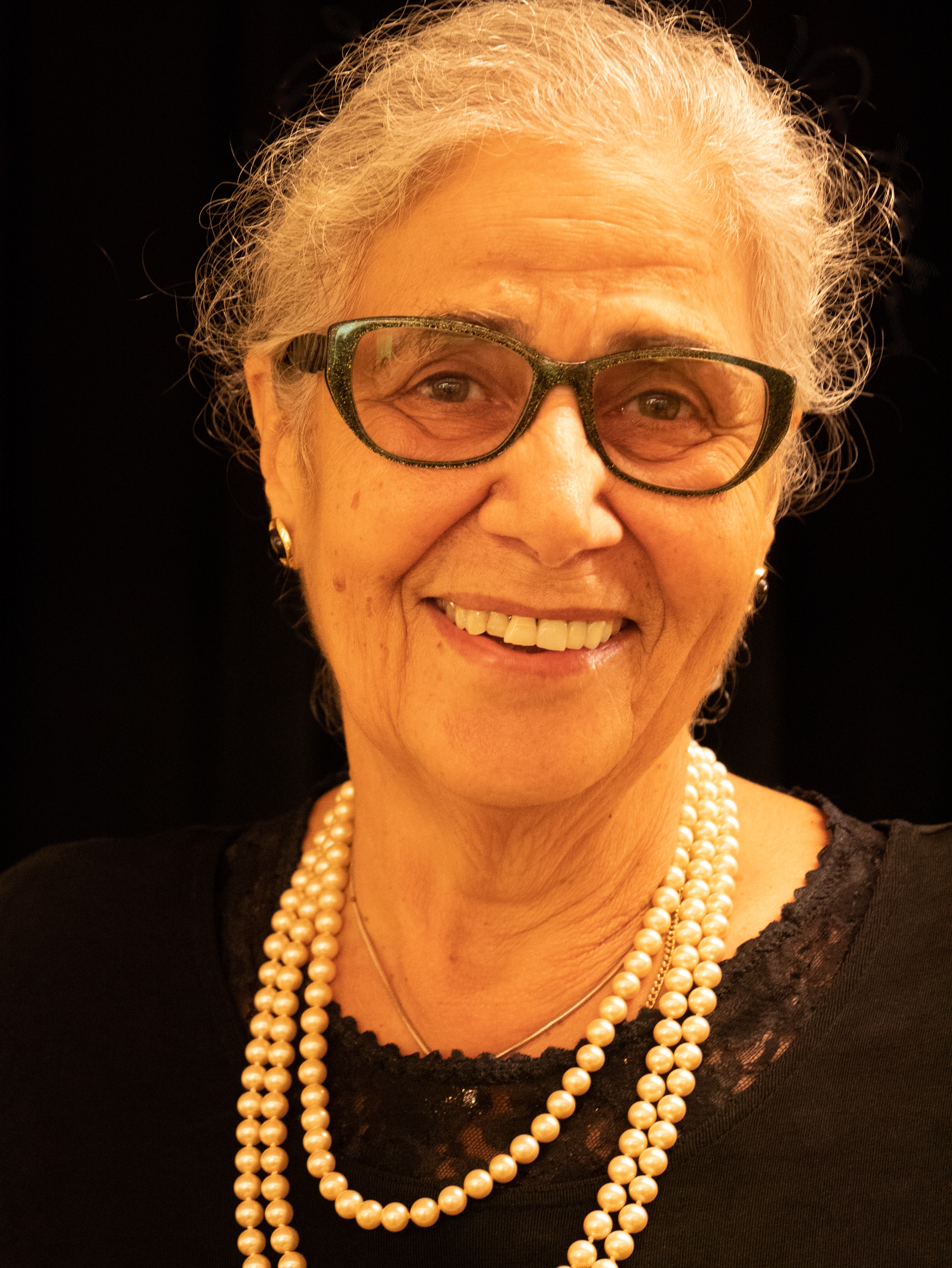
Jacqueline Semha Gmach

Jacqueline Semha Nataf Gmach is a Tunisian-born, Sorbonne-trained American educator. Her work focuses on Jewish culture, Sephardic history, and preserving the artistic achievements of people victimized by the Holocaust.

== Early life and career ==
Jacqueline Semha Nataf was born in Tunisia in 1940 to Mathilde and Joseph Nataf, where her father was a dentist and her mother was a homemaker. The name Nataf is derived from the Hebrew word for an incense described in the Old Testament. The Nataf family was a typically patriarchal North African family whose observance of Jewish laws and customs was traditional and a significant part of daily life. The family were Sephardic Jews which trace their ancestry back to Spain, where Jews were expelled in the late 15th century. Gmach’s early childhood was punctuated by the Nazi invasion of Tunisia, at that time a French protectorate, in 1942. One of Gmach’s earliest experiences at the age of two, as related to her by family members and recalled in her memoir, is accidentally dropping a nutcracker from an upstairs balcony where it struck the head of a German soldier who was standing on the street below. She also recalls her father being forced to treat a German soldier, at great risk to his life and that of his family.

In 1958, Gmach moved to Paris, France to study physics and chemistry at the Sorbonne University. She was able to obtain French citizenship as her mother was of Algerian birth, and the Evian accords of 1962 briefly allowed those of Algerian descent to claim French citizenship. Rather than returning to Tunisia after her studies, she remained in France for fear of losing her French citizenship. She taught chemistry and physics there. During this time, she traveled several times to Israel. During an extended trip to Israel, she studied Hebrew and taught at the middle school level at the College Francais de Yaffo, a college catering to French students.

France, however, remained her main home base. In 1966, she met her future husband, David Gmach, a French Jew who had survived the Holocaust by being hidden by a French Christian family. In 1967, when war broke out in Israel (subsequently known as the Six-Day War), Gmach influenced her parents to move to France, fearing that the war would lead to violence against Jews in Tunisia. Her parents remained in France for the rest of their lives. In the aftermath of the Six Day War, Gmach returned to Israel to help repair damage to the country. David and Gmach married in 1968 and started a family. In 1975, Gmach and David Gmach relocated to Montreal, Canada, where Gmach taught middle school chemistry at the Ecole Maimonide (Maimonides School), eventually becoming Vice-Principal.

== Second career ==
In 1981, Gmach and David Gmach moved again, this time to San Diego, California (United States). Initially, Gmach worked as director of the Devonshire Gallery in La Jolla. The Devonshire changed its name to JudaiCollection, featuring Judaica fine art and giftware in all media. Jacqueline also served in 1987 as president of the Association of La Jolla Arts Gallery, hosting events presenting original pastels, oils, etchings, and lithographs. But Gmach's second career began in earnest in 1995, when she assumed the role of cultural programming associate and director at the Lawrence Family Jewish Community Center (JCC).

=== San Diego Jewish Book Fair ===
A recurring role in Gmach's position at the JCC was curating and directing San Diego’s Jewish Book Fair, a multi-day event featuring speakers and offering a wide selection of books for sale. The 2016 book fair was described by the San Diego Union Tribune as featuring “rock music, terrorism, cooking, cyber security, Nazi Germany, Broadway musicals. Speakers included comedians, singers, radio hosts, musicians, actors, artists, journalists, novelists, playwrights, fashion experts, economists, diplomats, attorneys, rabbis, Holocaust scholars, and representatives of non-profit organizations. There were also cooking events and events for children and families

=== San Diego Jewish Music Festival ===
Gmach directed the San Diego Jewish Music Festival, which sponsored performers such as violinist Zina Schiff in 2003, the Klezmatics and Joshua Nelson (“the prince of Kosher gospel) in 2008, the Afula Conservatory Symphonic Band and Choir in 2009, and A. J. Croce in 2010. The music festival was produced through the joint effort of the San Diego Lawrence Family JCC, the Berkeley Jewish Music Festival, the La Jolla Music Society, and the San Diego Symphony.

=== Holocaust education ===
Gmach conducted interviews to document the experiences of Holocaust survivors from North Africa and the Middle East in conjunction with the USC Shoah Foundation. The interviewees included Tunisian-born Albert Memmi, Iraqi-born Naim Kattan, and Algerian-born winner of the 1997 Nobel Prize in physics Claude Cohen-Tannoudji. These testimonies were recorded and the videos are included in the Middle East and North Africa (MENA) Collection of the Shoah Foundation.

Another educational project was an exhibit entitled “DAVKA: The Survival of a People,” which included photographs, videos, and oral histories about the lives of Holocaust survivors and their families living in San Diego. The exhibit illuminated their lives both during and after the Holocaust. The exhibit showed how the survivors emerged from one of the darkest chapters in history to develop new lives, and how they passed their memories on to future generations. Images of the survivors were displayed in diptychs, with photographs of the survivors and their descendants. Sempra Energy provided a grant for the project. Survivors who were featured in the exhibit include David Gmach, Agathe Ehrenfried Rose Schindler, Gussie Zaks, and Fanny Krasner-Lebovitz. The Davka Exhibit was the inspiration for a video installation developed by the UK Holocaust Centre entitled Generations: Survival and the Legacy of Hope, which explored the impact of the Holocaust on four families across three generations. The Generations exhibit was featured at the United Nations observance of the 2010 International Day of Commemoration in memory of the victims of the Holocaust.

Another project spearheaded by Gmach was an exhibit entitled “Inside Anne Frank’s House.” The concept was inspired by the book of the same title. The exhibit was developed in conjunction with the San Diego Jewish Book Fair in 2006, with backing from Sempra and Bank of America. The exhibit was a recreation of two rooms in which the Frank and van Pels family sheltered in Amsterdam during the Nazi occupation. The exhibit was a 16 by 18 foot structure which was entered through a small doorway hidden by a moveable bookcase. Along with the structure, the exhibit included a video about Anne Frank’s life, suggested discussion topics, and a worksheet for students to express their feelings about the exhibit and its subject matter. The exhibit traveled to various libraries and synagogues throughout San Diego County.

The “We Are the Tree of Life” program is one of Gmach’s recent endeavors. The program seeks to preserve and promote literature, music, dance, poetry, and drawings developed by prisoners in World War II-era concentration camps and ghettos. The impetus for the program was the 2018 mass shooting of worshippers at Pittsburgh’s Tree of Life Synagogue, particularly the death of Rose Malinger, the oldest (97-yr. old) victim. The shooting prompted Gmach to develop programming focusing on the use of artistic expression to survive and convey beauty in even the most challenging circumstances. The organization began with a San Diego focus, and has since expanded to other countries, especially France and Israel. Events sponsored by “We Are the Tree of Life” included an online event featuring Edith Eva Eger, a psychologist and Hungarian-born Holocaust survivor whose dance skills helped her survive. Co-sponsoring the event were the San Diego Center for Jewish Culture, the USC Shoah Foundation, and the Holocaust Center of Pittsburgh. The organization produced a documentary entitled Carry On, featuring works of literature, visual arts, music, and dance by people who were confined in concentration camps and ghettos during the Nazi period. The film also features contemporary performers and community leaders who are honoring Holocaust victims by showing the works of art they left behind. The film was produced by Clint Burkett, and cast members included Stephen D. Smith, Executive Director of the USC Shoah Foundation; Lauren Bairnsfather, Director of The Holocaust Center of Pittsburgh; Peter Yarrow, singer, songwriter, and activist; Francesco Lotoro, pianist/composer and co-founder of Instituto di Letteratura Musicale Concentrazionara (a non-profit organization that protects and promotes music written in concentration camps); guitarist Pepe Romero; and Jacqueline Semha Gmach and her daughter, singer and composer Yael Gmach. IMAX producer Alan G. Markowitz joined later as a creative consultant and producer.

=== Books ===
Gmach is the author of “From Bombolini to Bagel: A Story of Two Worlds," a memoir, “The Antiphonary of Love: The Call of the Scroll" and "Aberration or Stupidity: Be Kind."

=== Awards and accolades ===
- Recipient of the 2008 Marla Bennett Humanitarian award
- Recipient of the 2011 San Diego KPBS/Union Bank Hero for Jewish Education
- Described by the San Diego Legends Project of the San Diego County Library as a San Diego legend
- Juror in the 5th Moscow Jewish Film Festival (2019)
- Community outreach coordinator for San Diego State University's Initiative for Moral Courage (IMC), a program focusing on the recognition of moral courage
- Project Director for the Sephardi Mizrahi Testimony Collection at the University of Southern California
