= Leon Black (disambiguation) =

Leon Black is the name of several people:

== Surname ==
- Leon Black (basketball) (1932-2021), American college basketball coach
- Leon Black (born 1951), American private equity investor with business ties to Jeffrey Epstein, chairman of the Museum of Modern Art from 2018 to 2021

== In fiction ==
- Leon Black (Curb Your Enthusiasm), a Curb Your Enthusiasm character.

== See also ==
- Leon Schwartz (1901-1990), a klezmer and classical music violinist.
