= Mermaid's Avenue =

Song by Woody Guthrie

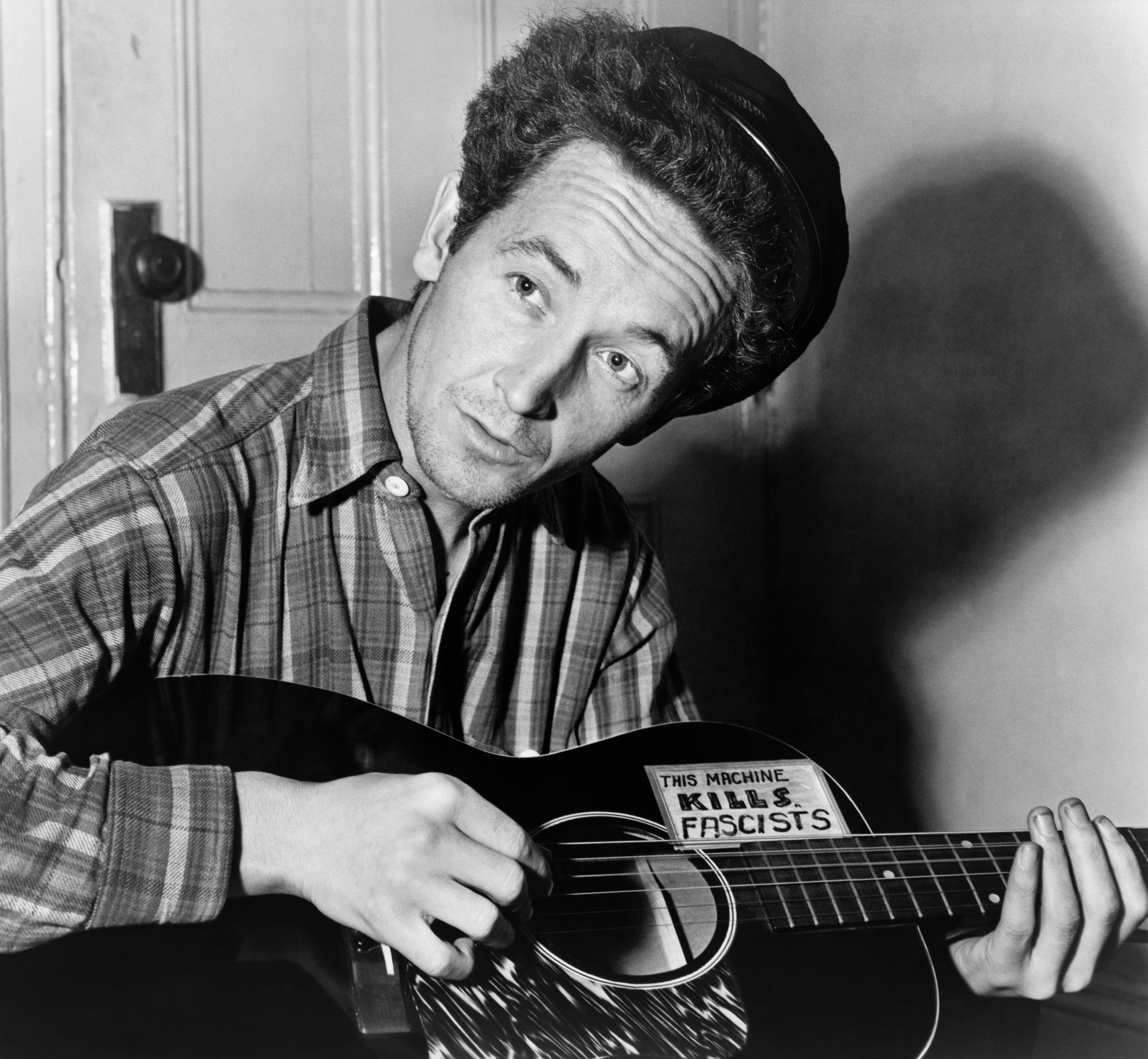
Woody Guthrie in 1943 with guitar labeled "This machine kills fascists"

"Mermaid's Avenue" is a song written by American folk singer Woody Guthrie. In 1943, Guthrie moved his family to 3520 Mermaid Avenue, Coney Island, New York. The song, written in 1950, is named after this street. There, Guthrie – whose wife was Jewish, although he was not – was an active participant in the thriving cultural and political scene of Brooklyn's Jewish community. The song's title (without the possessive apostrophe) later served as the project title for the Wilco and Billy Bragg album Mermaid Avenue; a cover version by the New York-based klezmer band The Klezmatics is included on their 2006 album Wonder Wheel.

The lyrics describe Guthrie's vision of America in microcosm. All sorts of unlikely comings and goings transpire, with meetings between unlikely characters. The scene, although fervent, is not always pretty, leading him to wonder in the song's refrain, "Why they call it Mermaid Avenue, that’s more than I can see."
