= Joshua Rayzner =

Joshua Rayzner (יהושע רײזנער Yehoshe Reyzner c. 1860–1915) was a Yiddish-language poet and singer from Poland mainly remembered today for being the composer of Lid fun Titanik (Ballad of the Titanic), a song performed by Mandy Patinkin, Lorin Sklamberg, and others.

== Biography ==
Rayzner was born in Łódź, Congress Poland, around 1860. Little is known about his life, but he became known as a blind street entertainer, singer and poet, well-liked by children in the streets of Łódź. His poems have been compared to that of a Badchen, the traditional Jewish wedding entertainer and coupletist of Eastern Europe. In 1911, a set of his poems were included in a collection of Yiddish theatre songs published in Warsaw by Leib Morgenshtern, which included a balled called Tsvey tayere lieder, Di amerikaner shif, Vi zi iz untergegangen (Two beloved songs, the American ship, how it sank). With the sinking of the Titanic in 1912, the song became popularized in the Yiddish Theatre in Poland and became known as the Lid fun Titanik, where it continued to be sung until the 1930s. Decades later the song was 'rediscovered' by Yiddish folklorist Chana Mlotek and has since been performed by Mandy Patinkin, Lorin Sklamberg, Daniel Kahn, and other artists.

Unfortunately, aside from Amerikaner Shif and another poem about the 1906 Łódź pogrom which were published in the 1911 collection by Morgenshtern, as well as an undated booklet of his works called Badkhonishe lider (Jester's songs), few of his numerous poems have been documented.

Rayzner died in the hospital in Warsaw in the winter of 1915. The cause of his death is said to have been starvation.
