= Divan (film) =

- Directed by: Pearl Gluck
- Written by: Pearl Gluck; Susan Korda
- Produced by: Pearl Gluck; Andras Suranyi
- Edited by: Zelda Greenstein
- Music by: Frank London
- Production company: Palinka Pictures
- Release date: 2004
- Running time: 90 minutes
- Country: United States

Divan is a 2004 documentary film directed by Pearl Gluck. This film documents the director's journey as she returns to her Hungarian roots in order to find a couch that had been in her family for years. During this search the audience gets to witness Gluck explore her true identity, as well as gain a glimpse into Hasidic culture.

== Plot ==
Pearl Gluck seeks to bring an ancestral couch, upon which esteemed rabbis once slept, back to her family. She travels from her home community of Hasidic Brooklyn to her roots in Hungary. During this journey Gluck meets a colorful cast of people, such as a couch exporter, her ex-communist cousin living in Budapest, a pair of matchmakers, and a group of formerly Orthodox Jews.

== Production ==
Divan was in production for five years as Gluck's debut feature documentary. It was developed with that assistance of the Sundance Institute.

== Reviews ==
The film received an overall positive reception from critics, with a 71 score from Metacritic and a 95% score from Rotten Tomatoes.

== Screenings and awards ==
- Titanic International Filmfestival (2009) Official Selection
- Wisconsin Film Festival Official Selection
- Tribeca Film Festival Official Selection
- Hong Kong Jewish Film Festival Official Selection
- Warsaw Jewish Film Festival Official Selection
