= Possessed (The Klezmatics album) =

Studio album by The Klezmatics
- Released: 1997
- Genre: Klezmer
- Label: Xenophile
- Producer: Robert Musso

The Klezmatics chronology
Jews with Horns (1995)	Possessed (1997)	The Well: Klezmatics with Chava Alberstein (1998)

Possessed is an album by the American klezmer group the Klezmatics, released in 1997.

== Production ==
The album was produced by Robert Musso. "Moroccan Game" is an instrumental.

The second half contains the band's score to Tony Kushner's A Dybbuk, or Between Two Worlds. Kushner also penned the liner notes.

== Critical reception ==
Professional ratings
Review scores
Source	Rating
AllMusic	4.5/5 stars
Chicago Tribune	4/4 stars
Robert Christgau	A−
(The New) Rolling Stone Album Guide	4/5 stars
Windsor Star	A

Robert Christgau opined that "this is a vision band with a genre, not a genre band with a vision." The Advocate wrote that "there's a heaviness to the Klezmatics that's anathema to ordinary klezmer music, which by its very nature and function is escapist, even as it celebrates cultural cohesion."

The Windsor Star stated that "the clarinet wails, the fiddle and horns sing, the beat is incessant, and the Yiddish vocals transcend the language barrier." The Chicago Tribune thought that "Alicia Svigals' violin is a revelation, and Lorin Sklamberg's vocals—which can be as sublime as a cantor's or as sly as a drunk's—evoke the Jewish diaspora in both divine and uniquely American terms."

AllMusic wrote that "while there is plenty of their familiar frenzied spiritual party music, there is also some goregeously evocative minor-key mysticism."

== Track listing ==
1. Shprayz Ikh Mir
2. Kolomeyke
3. Moroccan Game
4. An Undoing World
5. Mizmor Shir Lehanef (Reefer Song)
6. Shvartz Un Vays (Black and White)
7. Lomir Heybn Dem Bekher
8. Sirba Matey Matey
9. Mipney Ma
10. Beggars' Dance
11. Shnaps-Nign
12. Interlude
13. Dybbuk Shers
14. Fradde's Song
15. Der Shvatser Mi Adir (The Black Benediction)
16. Hinokh Yafo
17. Mipney Ma (reprise)
