= Pearl Gluck =

American filmmaker

Pearl Gluck is an American filmmaker and professor. Her films, which explores themes of class, gender, and faith, have appeared as a part of the Sundance Lab, as well as played at Cannes Film Festival, Tribeca Film Festival, and on PBS.

== Early career ==
Gluck grew up in Borough Park, Brooklyn, New York, where she was raised in a Hasidic household. She completed her schooling with an MFA from City College of New York and a bachelor's degree from Brandeis University. Ten years after leaving her childhood home (1996), she was given a Fulbright grant in order to collect stories from the Yiddish speaking people in Hungary, an area that was once home to thriving Hasidic communities. In 1998 Gluck appeared in documentary, A Life Apart: Hasidism in America, which was directed and produced by Oren Rudavsky and Menachem Daum. Since then she has taught at Ohio University, Indiana University, Emory University, and Rutgers University, where she led courses in screenwriting, production, directing, film criticism, film studies, and Jewish studies. She joined the College of Communication at Penn State University in 2014, where she is now an assistant professor and teaching courses in screenwriting, directing, and producing.

== Film career ==
During Gluck's film career she has created an assortment of films, both documentary and narrative, which have been played at multiple film festivals. She produces her films through Palinka Pictures.

In 2000 Gluck was awarded a Sundance Producer's Lab Fellowship and in 2001 a Sundance Festival mentorship, which she would use to begin production on her first individual project, Divan. Divan was Gluck's first feature-length documentary, in which she returns to her Hungarian roots to find a couch, on which esteemed rabbis once slept, that has been in her family for years. Through this search and over the course of the film you see Gluck explore her true identity and get a glimpse into Hasidic culture.

In 2011 Gluck wrote and directed a short, A Lesson in Love, which follows a young Hasidic couple who venture out of their segregated community to escape its laws of modesty in order to battle their infidelity.

Her next short, Where is Joel Baum, starring Lynn Cohen, won various awards at festivals, including Best Film at The Female Eye film festival and best actor for Luzer Twersky at the Starz Denver Film Festival. This short tells a story about the unexpected consequences of a tragic accident. It takes place in the home of a Hasidic rabbi in Brooklyn.

Junior (2017) is a 26-minute short film about a mother who struggles to find her new normal after her teenage son is killed by an off-duty police officer. The inspiration for this film comes from a one-woman play written by Elle Jae Stewart. Gluck saw this play and suggested adapting the play into a film and shooting it in one continuous shot. The idea became a reality with Stewart, the writer and actress of the play, playing her same role in the film. Mark Stitzer, an award-winning videographer, filmed the short in one continuous shot just as Gluck imagined. The film deals with issues of media ethics on reporting racially motivated violence.

Her next project, currently in post-production, is her first feature length narrative film. This film, The Turn Out, tells the story of a trucker who discovers that an under-aged girl is being sex-trafficked at his local truckstop in Mineral Wells, West Virginia. The films follows this trucker as he decided whether or not he will get involved. The research for The Turn Out spanned over two years with local outreach and awareness efforts of many organizations, including Athens Child Advocacy Center in Ohio. The fictional story of the film was based on the true stories shared by survivors of trafficking and childhood sexual abuse, truckers, and advocates. The cast of The Turn Out contains real people with experiences which inspired the film. The film's aim is to raise awareness of women's agency and victimization, as well as counter the misconception that trafficking predominately involves women who come from outside the United States. The film highlights that a majority of the women committing these "crimes" are actually forced into it.

Currently Gluck has another short film in post-production titled Summer. Summer tells the story of two teenage girls who visit a Hasidic sleep-away-camp where, despite their efforts to maintain their purity, they end up exploring a forbidden book which leads them to a sexual awakening. The film is shot in the heart of Hasidic Upstate New York.

=== Other work ===
Gluck has worked with others in order to produce an assortment of films aside from those mentioned above. In 2001 she co-directed and co-produced the award-winning short, Great Balls of Fire, which screened at many festivals including, Transmediale, European Media Arts Festival, and the DIG.IT Festival at the Walker Center for the Arts. She has done work with media aside from film as well, in 2006 she recorded a walking tour of Williamsburg, where listeners can gain an understanding of the Hasidic community's traditions and faith. This audiobook won the 2007 Audie Award for Original Work. Gluck also works as a contributing producer for WTIU's the weekly special, on which she celebrates her completion of a motorcycle training course by traveling to The Boogie, a popular biker fest in Lawrence County.

Year	Film
2004	Divan
2011	A Lesson in Love
2012	Where is Joel Baum
2017	Junior
2017	The Turn Out
2017/II	Summer

== Screenings and awards ==
=== Divan ===
- Titanic International Film Festival: Budapest, Hungary (2009) – Official Selection
- Wisconsin Film Festival: Madison, WI – Official Selection
- Tribeca Film Festival: Tribeca, NY – Official Selection
- Hong Kong Jewish Film Festival: Hong Kong, China – Official Selection
- Warsaw Jewish Film Festival: Warsaw, Poland – Official Selection

=== Where Is Joel Baum? ===
- Starz Denver Film Festival: Denver, Colorado (2012) – Winner: Best Actor
- Toronto Female Eye Festival: Toronto, Ontario (2013) – Winner: Best Short Film

=== Junior ===
- Deep in The Heart Film Festival: Waco, TX (2017) – Winner: Best Actress in a Short Film
- Houston Black Film Festival: Houston, TX (2017)
- Azalea Film Festival: Mobile, AL (2017)
- Langston Hughes African American Film Festival: Seattle, WA (2017)
- Women of African Descent Film Festival: Brooklyn, NY (2017) – Winner: Jury Award
- San Francisco Black Film Festival: San Francisco, CA (2017) – Honorable Mention: Best Short Narrative Film
- Lake View International Film Festival: Punjab, India (2017) – Winner: Best Editor, Winner: Second Best international Short Film
- Miami Independent Film Festival: Miami, FL (2017)
- British Urban Film Festival: London, United Kingdom (2017)
- Austin Revolution Film Festival: Austin, TX (2017) – Nominated: Best Actress in a Short, Winner: Excellence in Acting, Winner: Best U.S. Short
- BronzeLens Film Festival: Atlanta, GA (2017)
- DC Black Film Festival: Washington, DC (2017)
- International Black Film Festival: Nashville, TN (2017)
