= Brother Moses Smote the Water =

Live album by The Klezmatics
- Released: 2005
- Genre: Klezmer, gospel
- Label: Piranha Records

The Klezmatics chronology
Rise Up! Shteyt Oyf! (2003)	Brother Moses Smote the Water (2005)	Wonder Wheel (2006)

Brother Moses Smote the Water is a live album by the American klezmer group the Klezmatics, with Joshua Nelson and Kathryn Farmer. It was released in 2005 by Piranha Records. The album mixes together traditional Yiddish songs and gospel.

The Klezmatics and Nelson supported the album by touring together in 2005.

== Production ==
Recorded live in Potsdamer Platz, the songs on the album are about the Jewish exodus from Egypt, and the commonality of Jewish and African American historical experience.

== Critical reception ==
Professional ratings
Review scores
Source	Rating
AllMusic	4.5/5 stars
Robert Christgau	(2-star Honorable Mention)
Philadelphia Daily News	A−
The Plain Dealer	A

The Times thought that "it's not so much a world music fusion as a spiritual transformation, and the result is as soulful as it is uplifting." The Philadelphia Daily News deemed the album "an intriguing collaboration" concerning "the struggle against repression common to the histories of Jewish and African-American people."

The Plain Dealer determined that "while some musical fusion sounds forced, the Jewish kosher music updated by the Klezmatics blends naturally with the black gospel songs newly interpreted by vocalists/keyboardists Joshua Nelson and Kathryn Farmer." The Virginian-Pilot called the album's performances "stirring, joyful, reverent and triumphant."

AllMusic wrote that "the styles are crunched together nearly seamlessly, the languages used (alternately Hebrew, Yiddish, and English) being the only differential in some parts."

== Track listing ==
1. Eyliyohu Hanovi
2. Elijah Rock
3. Ki Loy Nue
4. Shnirele Perele
5. Walk in Jerusalem
6. Go Down Moses
7. Moses Smote the Water
8. Oh Mary Don't You Weep
9. Didn't It Rain
10. Ale Brider
