= Rise Up! Shteyt Oyf! =

Studio album by The Klezmatics
- Released: 2003
- Genre: Klezmer
- Label: Rounder Records

The Klezmatics chronology
The Well: Klezmatics with Chava Alberstein (1998)	Rise Up! Shteyt Oyf! (2003)	Brother Moses Smote the Water (2004)

Professional ratings
Review scores
Source	Rating
AllMusic	3/5 stars
Robert Christgau	A−
Los Angeles Daily News	3/4 stars
Los Angeles Times	4/4 stars
Pitchfork	8.0/10

Rise Up! Shteyt Oyf! is an album by the American klezmer group the Klezmatics. It was released in 2003.

== Production ==
"I Ain't Afraid" is a cover of the Holly Near song. "Barikadn" samples the voice of the activist Shmerke Kaczerginski.

== Critical reception ==
Robert Christgau wrote: "Leaning on the mournful Eastern European modalities the shtetl assimilated long ago—check especially the Matt Darriau threnody and Frank London prayer—the Klezmatics conjure an album as soaked in 9/11 as The Rising, whose similar title is no coincidence."

AllMusic wrote that "the emphasis is most definitely on songs, rather than instrumentals, and for the most part they keep their fire quite restrained, rarely letting the instrumental work fly into the stratosphere as they have in the past."

== Track listing ==
1. Klezmorimlekh mayne libinke
2. Kats un Moyz
3. Loshn-Koydesh
4. Tepel
5. I Ain't Afraid
6. Di Gayster
7. Yo Riboyn Olam
8. Bulgars #2
9. Barikadn
10. Davenen
11. St. John's Nign
12. Hevil iz Havolim
13. Makht oyf!
14. Perets-Tanst
15. I Ain't Afraid (English edit)
