= Richie Barshay =

American musician

Richie Barshay is a jazz, Afro-Latin, and klezmer percussionist based in Northampton, Massachusetts and New York City.

From his work with Herbie Hancock in the 2000s, to tours and recordings with Chick Corea, Esperanza Spalding, The Klezmatics, Fred Hersch, and Kenny Werner, he's been dubbed "a major rhythm voice on the rise" by Downbeat magazine, and The Guardian (UK) praises "a major innovator who also knows how to have fun." He’s also performed with Natalie Merchant, Bobby McFerrin, Joe Lovano, Lee Konitz, Donald Harrison, Lionel Loueke, Julian Lage, the Curtis Brothers, Gabriel Kahane, Pete Seeger, and the Tony Award winning musical The Band’s Visit on Broadway and national tour.

Since 2004 he’s traveled across 5 continents as an American Musical Envoy with the U.S. State Department.

Richie can be heard on over 90 recordings as a sideman, and on two self-produced albums as a leader: Sanctuary featuring Chick Corea (2014), and Homework featuring Herbie Hancock (2004).

Based in Northampton, Massachusetts and New York City, he is an AmSAT certified Alexander Technique teacher helping performing artists and others regain more body-mind coordination and ease of movement.
