= The Klezmatics =

American klezmer music group

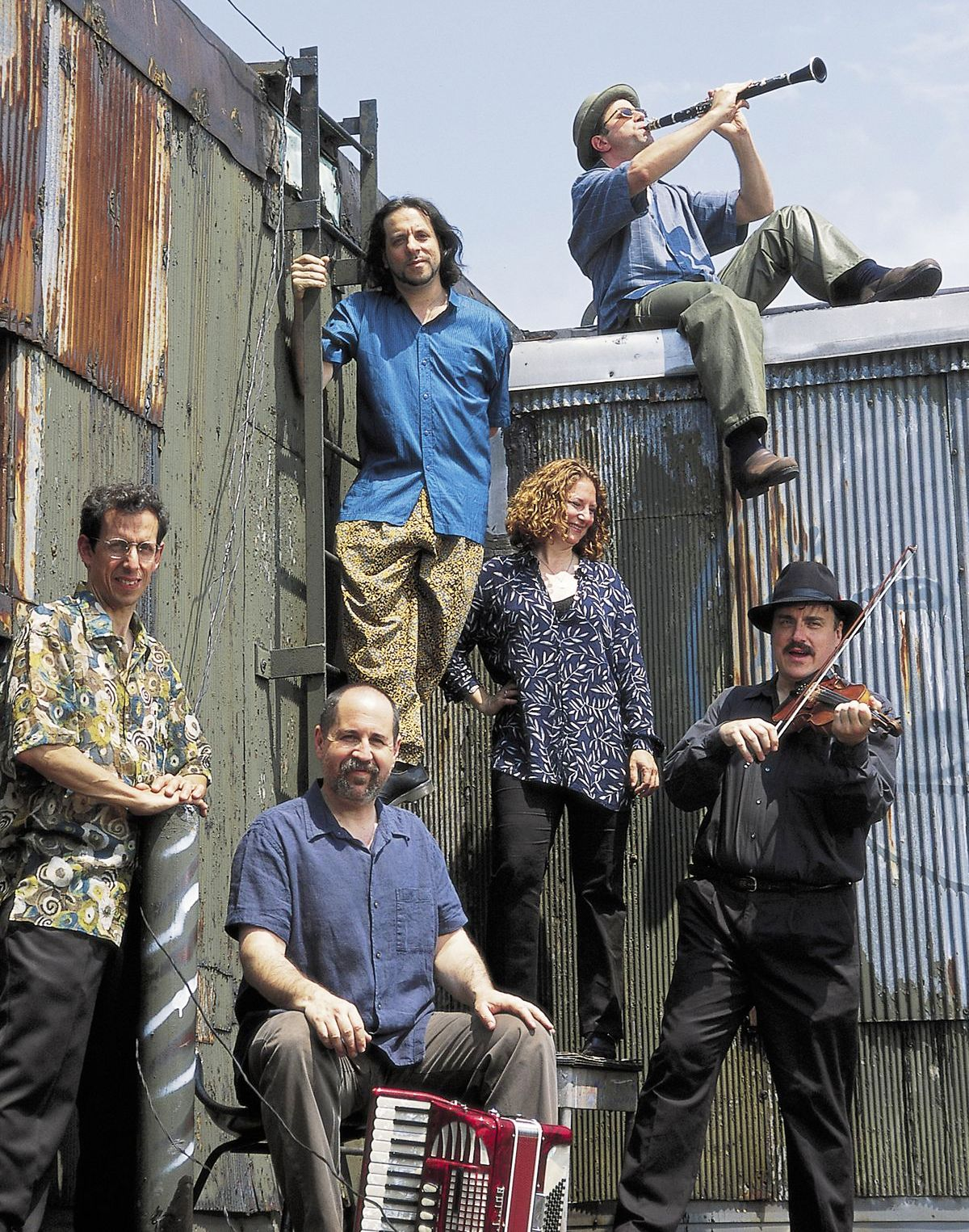
- The Klezmatics, early 2000s line-up.

Background information
- Genres: Klezmer
- Years active: 1986–present
- Members: Matt Darriau, Frank London, Paul Morrissett, Lorin Sklamberg, Lisa Gutkin, David Licht, Richie Barshay
- Past members: David Krakauer, Margot Leverett, Kurt Bjorling, Alicia Svigals, David Lindsay.
- Website: www.klezmatics.com

The Klezmatics are an American klezmer music group based in New York City, who have achieved fame singing in several languages, most notably mixing older Yiddish tunes with other types of more contemporary music of differing origins. They have also recorded pieces in Aramaic and Bavarian.

== Personnel ==
Current members include composers Matt Darriau, alto saxophone, clarinet, and kaval, and Frank London, on trumpet and keys, Paul Morrissett playing bass and tsimbl cimbalom, vocalist Lorin Sklamberg on accordion and piano, Lisa Gutkin on violin and vocals, and David Licht or Richie Barshay on drums.

Past members include David Krakauer, Margot Leverett, Kurt Bjorling and Michael Lowenstern on the clarinet, Alicia Svigals on violin, and David Lindsay on bass. In addition, Boo Reiners, Susan McKeown, Joshua Nelson, Chava Alberstein, and Aaron Alexander have frequently collaborated with the band.

== History ==
The group formed in New York's East Village in 1986. The performers present at the first rehearsal were Frank London, Lorin Sklamberg, Margot Leverett, Alicia Svigals, David Licht, and David Lindsay. They have appeared numerous times on television, including on the PBS Great Performances series with Itzhak Perlman. They have collaborated with the Romani virtuoso Ferus Mustafov, Israeli singers Chava Alberstein and Ehud Banay, American singer Arlo Guthrie, and Moroccan musicians The Master Musicians of Jajouka. In Berlin, they worked with poet Allen Ginsberg. Trumpeter Frank London composed the score for Pilobolus Dance Theater's work, Davenen, which the band performed. The members come from different musical backgrounds. Drummer Richie Barshay plays jazz with Herbie Hancock and Chick Corea. Before joining the band, violinist Lisa Gutkin had been playing bluegrass/Celtic music.

The Klezmatics' 20th-anniversary concert took place at New York City's Town Hall on March 5, 2006. That event is included in the documentary chronicling the band's history and significance, The Klezmatics: On Holy Ground (2010). Five years later, they recorded a 25th-anniversary CD at the same location.

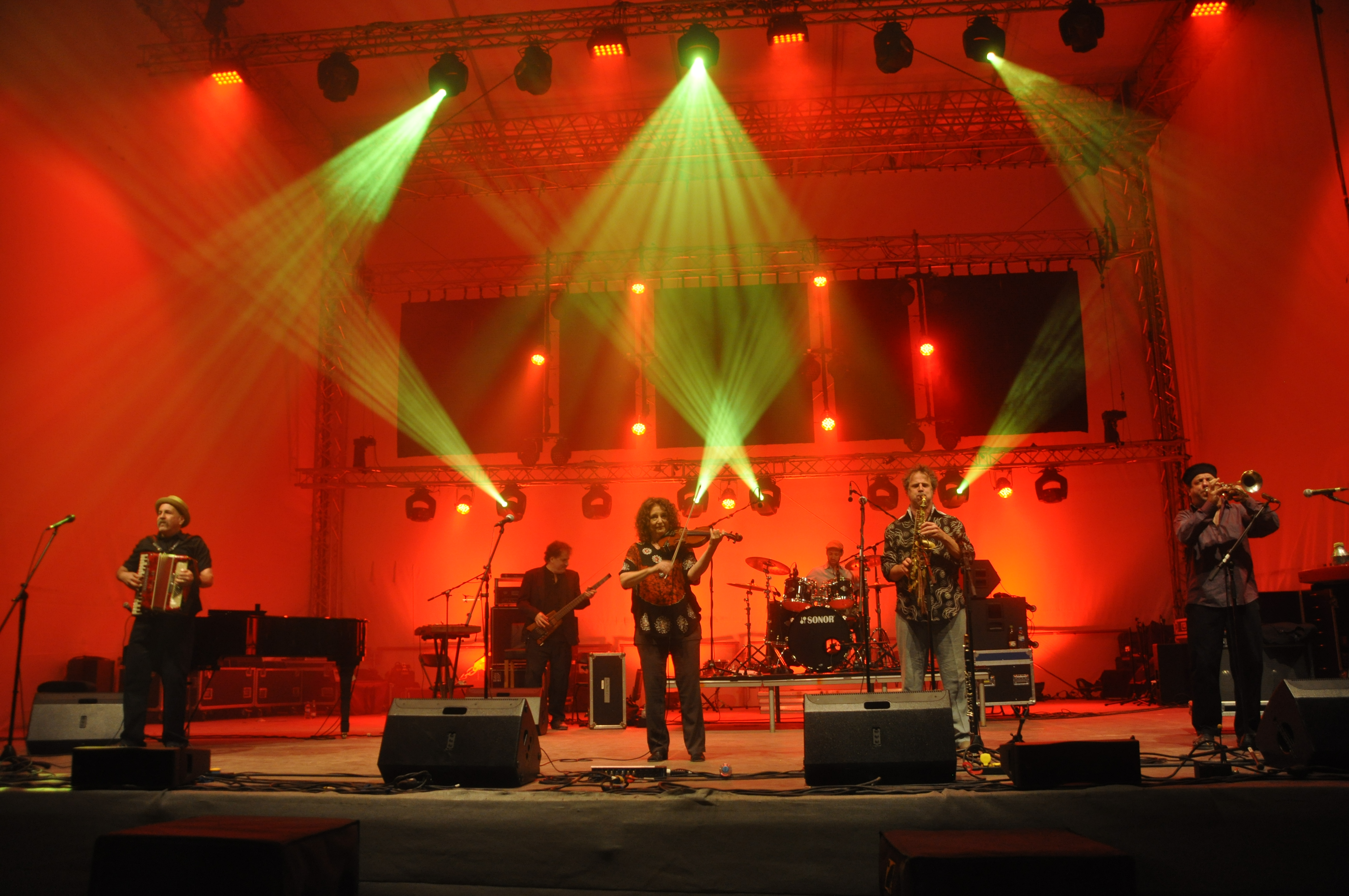
Performing at the 2013 world music Festival "Horizonte", Ehrenbreitstein Fortress, Koblenz

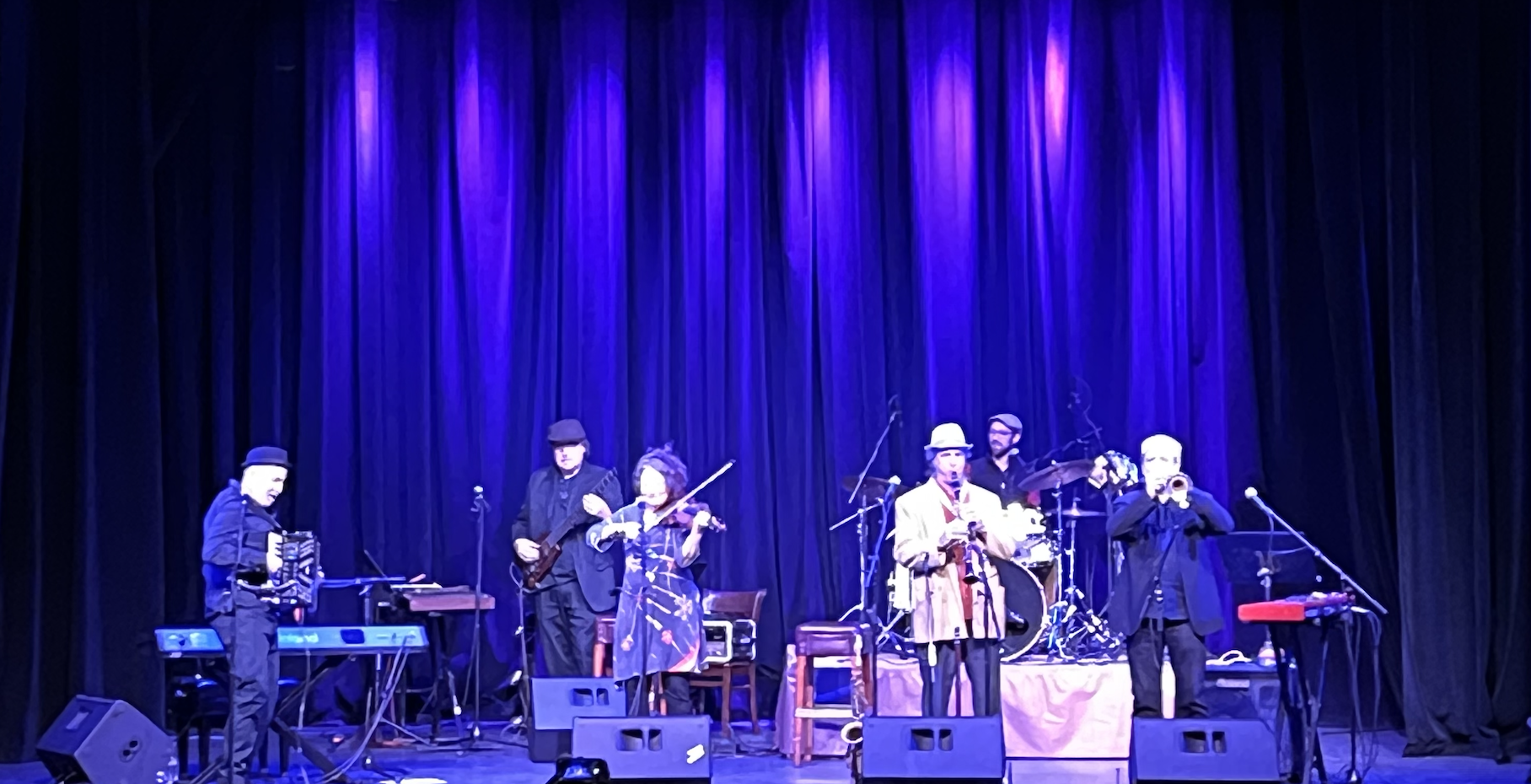
Performing in Nevada City, California, 2023

== Recordings ==
The Klezmatics have recorded for Rounder, Piranha, Xenophile, Flying Fish, and the now-defunct Jewish Music Group.

Wonder Wheel, released in 2006, showcased lyrics by American folk icon Woody Guthrie, selected by the band from the Woody Guthrie archive. Although the music draws primarily from a wide range of Americana, not klezmer, the album won a Grammy in the category of Best Contemporary World Music Album. Another album of Guthrie material, with music drawn from the band's more usual Yiddish, Eastern European Jewish music roots, Woody Guthrie's Happy Joyous Hanukkah, was released the same year. Guthrie's granddaughter, Sarah Lee Guthrie, has appeared with them. Other key collaborations include the music to Tony Kushner's adaptation of The Dybbuk, "A Dybbuk: Between Two Worlds”; The Well: Klezmatics with Chava Alberstein, in which poetry by several prominent Yiddish poets was set to music; and Brother Moses Smote the Water with Jewish gospel-style singer Joshua Nelson.

== Discography ==
- 1989 – Shvaygn = toyt (Piranha Musik)

Track No.	Title
1	Ershter Vals
2	A Glezele Vayn
3	Tantst Yidelekh
4	Russian Shers
5	Bilovi
6	Dzhankoye
7	Ale Brider
8	Czernowitzer Bulgar
9	Mazl Tov, Zeydns Tants
10	Schneider-Zwiefacher
11	Rebns Khasene / Khasene Tants
12	Di Zen Vet Aruntergeyn

- 1990 – Rhythm and Jews (Piranha Musik)
- 1995 – Jews with Horns (Flying Fish)
- 1997 – Possessed (Xenophile)

Track No.	Title	Notes
1	Shprayz Ikh Mir	
2	Kolomeyke	
3	Moroccan Game	
4	An Undoing World	
5	Mizmor Shir Lehanef (Reefer Song)	Mizmor Shir Lehanef is the first Yiddish anthem written about marijuana.
6	Shvartz Un Vays (Black and White)	
7	Lomir Heybn Dem Bekher	
8	Sirba Matey Matey	
9	Mipney Ma	
10	Beggars' Dance	
11	Shnaps-Nign	
12	Interlude	
13	Dybbuk Shers	
14	Fradde's Song	
15	Der Shvatser Mi Adir (The Black Benediction)	
16	Hinokh Yafo	
17	Mipney Ma (reprise)	
18	Eyn Mol	

- 1998 – The Well: Klezmatics with Chava Alberstein (Xenophile)
- 2003 – Rise Up! Shteyt Oyf! (Rounder)

Track No.	Title
1	Klezmorimlekh mayne libinke
2	Kats un Moyz
3	Loshn-Koydesh
4	Tepel
5	I Ain't Afraid
6	Di Gayster
7	Yo Riboyn Olam
8	Bulgars No. 2
9	Barikadn
10	Davenen
11	St. John's Nign
12	Hevil iz Havolim
13	Makht oyf!
14	Perets-Tanst
15	I Ain't Afraid (English edit)

- 2004 – Brother Moses Smote the Water (with Joshua Nelson & Kathryn Farmer; Piranha Musik)

Track No.	Title	Notes
1	Eyliyohu Hanovi	2:38
2	Elijah Rock	9:17
3	Ki Loy Nue	6:40
4	Shnirele Perele	
5	Walk In Jerusalem	
6	Go Down Moses	
7	Moses Smote The Water	
8	Oh Mary Don't You Weep	
9	Didn't It Rain	
10	Ale Brider	

- 2006 – Wonder Wheel (Lyrics by Woody Guthrie) (JMG)
- 2006 – Woody Guthrie's Happy Joyous Hanukkah (JMG)
- 2008 – Tuml = Lebn: The Best of the First 20 Years (Piranha Musik)
- 2011 – Live at Town Hall (independent release, double album)

Disc No.	Track No.	Title
1	1	Man In A Hat
1	2	Bobe Tanz (feat. Margot Leverett)
1	3	Dzhankoye
1	4	Rhythm / Jews With Horns Medley: Fun Tashlikh / Fisherlid (feat. David Krakauer)
1	5	Dybbuk Suite: Mipney Ma / Beggars' Dance / Shnaps-nign / Di Gayster / Fradde's Song / Der Shvartser Mi Adir / Hinokh Yafo / Mipney Ma
1	6	Di Krenitse
1	7	St. John's Nign
1	8	Brother Moses Suite: Eyliyohu Havnovi
1	9	Brother Moses Suite: Elijah Rock (feat. Joshua Nelson)
2	1	Davenen
2	2	I Ain't Afraid (feat. Adrienne Cooper)
2	3	Gonna Get Through This World (feat. Susan McKeown)
2	4	Holy Ground
2	5	Moroccan Game
2	6	Hanuka Gelt
2	7	Medley: Lolly Lo / NY Psycho Freylekhs
2	8	Shnirele, Perele
2	9	Ale Brider
2	10	Tepel

- 2016 – Apikorsim (World Village)
- 2021 - Letters to Afar
- 2025 - Rhythm + Jew Revisited
- 2025 - Woody Guthrie's Happy Joyous Hanukkah - extended
- 2026 - We Were Made For These Times

== See also ==
- Secular Jewish music
