= Hong Kong Jewish Film Festival =

- Hong Kong Jewish Film Festival logo
- Location: Hong Kong
- Founded: 1999
- Website: Hong Kong Jewish Film Festival

The Hong Kong Jewish Film Festival (HKJFF) is an annual film festival dedicated to world cinema that focuses on Jewish life, history and culture worldwide. It was founded in 1999 by Howard Elias from Toronto, Canada, and takes place in Hong Kong.

The 15th Festival ran from 29 November to 7 December 2014. The 16th Festival ran from 14 to 22 November 2015. The 20th Festival ran from 2 to 10 November 2019. The 22nd Festival ran from 13 to 21 November 2021.
