= Alicia Svigals =

American violinist and composer (born 1963)

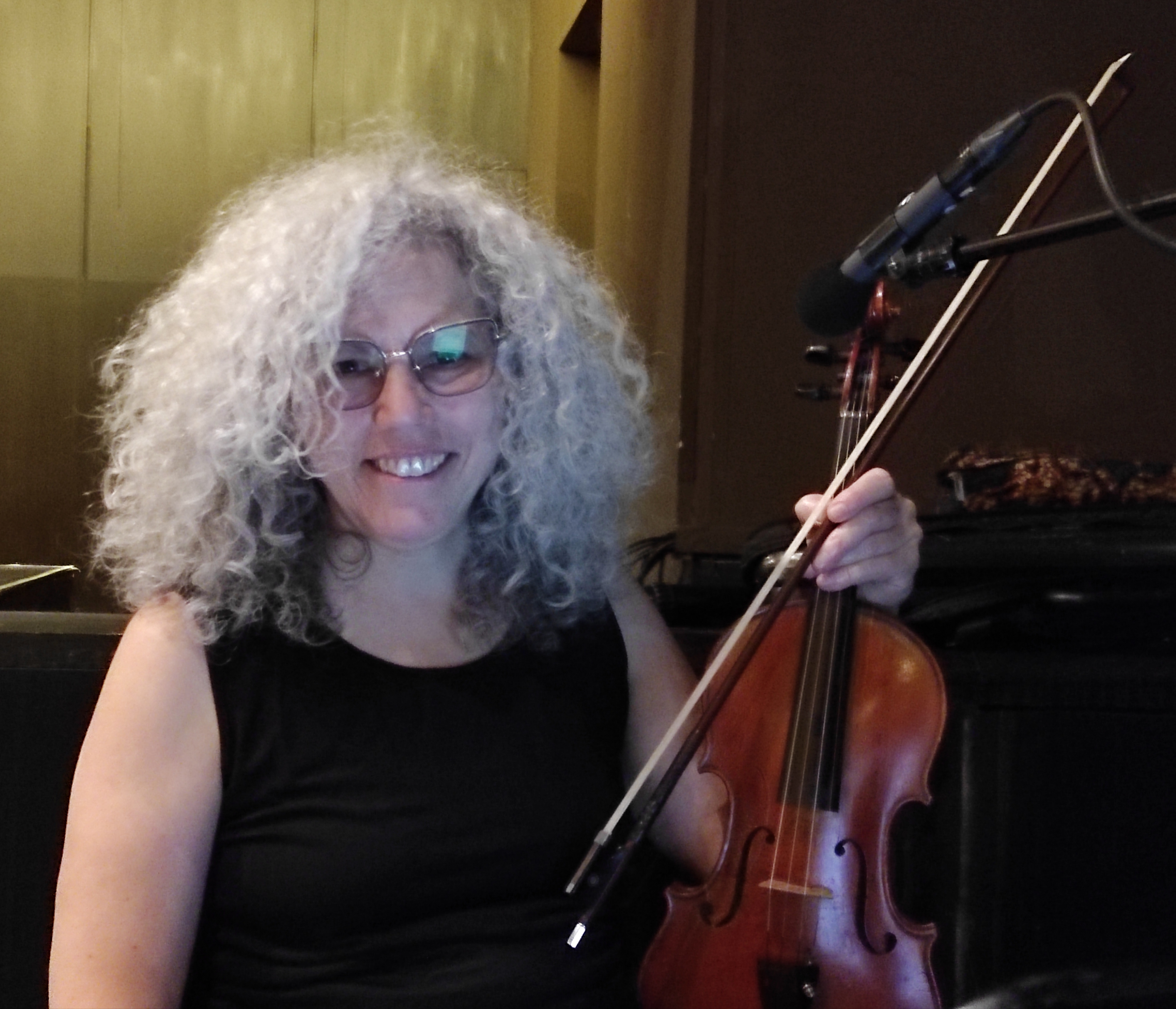

Background information
- Born: 1963 (age 62–63); New York City, U.S.
- Education: Brown University
- Genres: Classical
- Occupations: Musician; composer; vocalist
- Instruments: Violin; voice
- Years active: 1986–present
- Website: aliciasvigals.com

Alicia Svigals (born 1963) is an American violinist and composer. A co-founder of the Grammy Award-winning band The Klezmatics, she is considered by many to be the world's foremost living klezmer fiddler.

== Early life ==
Alicia Svigals, violinist, composer and vocalist, was born in 1963 in The Bronx, New York City, and studied ethnomusicology at Brown University.

== Career ==
Violinist/composer Alicia Svigals is widely considered to be the world's leading klezmer fiddler, and was a founder and longtime member of the Grammy-winning Klezmatics. In 2023, she was awarded an honorary doctorate in humane letters by the Jewish Theological Seminary in New York City. She has performed with and written for violinist Itzhak Perlman, and has worked with the Kronos Quartet, playwrights Tony Kushner and Eve Ensler, poet Allen Ginsberg, Robert Plant and Jimmy Page of Led Zeppelin, Debbie Friedman and Chava Albershteyn. Svigals was awarded a Foundation for Jewish Culture commission for her original score to the 1918 film The Yellow Ticket, and is a MacDowell fellow. Her CD Fidl (1996) reawakened klezmer fiddle tradition. Her second CD, Beregovski Suite Klezmer Reimagined, with jazz pianist Uli Geissendoerfer, is an original take on long-lost Jewish music from Ukraine. With pianist/composer Donald Sosin, she has co-written and performs three more silent film scores, which they tour internationally: The Ancient Law, The City Without Jews, and Man Without a World. In 2024, she released her follow-up to Fidl, entitled Fidl Afire, a collection of original and traditional tunes played in her signature klezmer fiddle style.

During the 1980s and 1990s, she studied with older klezmer violinist Leon Schwartz with the intent of reviving the style and technique of the klezmer violin tradition which had largely disappeared, and of which few recorded examples remain. Although classically trained since childhood, she also travelled around Europe and Israel in her youth and tried to learn local styles. Of her playing style, she said that it is "a combination of old fiddle style, clarinet technique, and this sort of Greek-Turkish timbre [... it's] half reconstructed-half invented."

She has taught klezmer to hundreds of students around the world over the past two decades, including violinists Steven Greenman and Itzhak Perlman.

Svigals was one of the founders in 1986 of the band the Klezmatics, and co-led the ensemble until 2001. With them, she appeared on A Prairie Home Companion, Rosie O'Donnell's Kids are Punny, Good Morning America, MTV News, Nickelodeon, and NPR's New Sound and Weekend Edition. As a composer for the group, she provided music for the play A Dybbuk by Tony Kushner, and collaborations with poet Allen Ginsberg and Israeli singer Chava Alberstein. They also performed with Itzhak Perlman on PBS' Emmy-winning Great Performances documentary In the Fiddler's House and on the Late Show with David Letterman, and appeared together in concert at Radio City Music Hall, Tanglewood, and Wolf Trap.

Svigals has been commissioned to compose for the Kronos Quartet, as well as recording for the television series The L Word. She was awarded the Foundation for Jewish Culture's 2013 New Jewish Culture Network commission for her original score to the 1918 silent Pola Negri film The Yellow Ticket. In 2014 she was an NEA MacDowell Fellow in composition, and a fellow at LABA: A Laboratory for Jewish Culture.

She is featured on recordings by such Hasidic artists such as Avraham Fried and Lipa Schmeltzer. She has collaborated with 'second generation' author Thane Rosenbaum, whose novel The Golems of Gotham is based in part on Svigals. She is featured on Herb Alpert’s 2008 recording of the Yiddish theater song "Belz", arranged by Marvin Hamlisch.Other recording, performing and composing collaborators include Diane Birch, Gary Lucas, Robert Plant and Jimmy Page, John Cale, Ben Folds, John Zorn, Debbie Friedman.

== Personal life ==
Svigals also has a wedding and bat/bar mitzvah band that plays every genre of music, based in New York and Boston. She is a lesbian.
