= Joshua Nelson (singer) =

Hasidic Black and Jewish gospel-fusion singer

Joshua Nelson (Hebrew: ג'ושוע נלסון) is an American gospel singer and Hebrew teacher.

== Biography ==
=== Background ===
Joshua Nelson is Black and Jewish and he goes by the nickname “the prince of kosher gospel,” and he has called himself "the KKK's worst nightmare." His grandparents emigrated to the US from Senegal, and he became fascinated with music when he was 8, while living in Brooklyn. His fascination lasted after he graduated from Newark's Performing Arts High School. Nelson was the high school's official soloist for the 4 years he studied there. He went on to do a 2-year college and kibbutz program in Israel studying at the Hebrew Union College as well as at the Hebrew University of Jerusalem.

While attending Hebrew University, he started blending Hebrew texts with gospel melodies and arranging Jewish hymns in gospel style, resulting in solo CDs like "Hebrew Soul" (2004) and "Mi Chamocha" (2005).

Both of Mr. Nelson’s parents are Jewish, and his family attended temple at a black synagogue in Brooklyn, then switched to Sharey Tefilo-Israel, in South Orange, New Jersey, a reform synagogue with a liberal reputation.

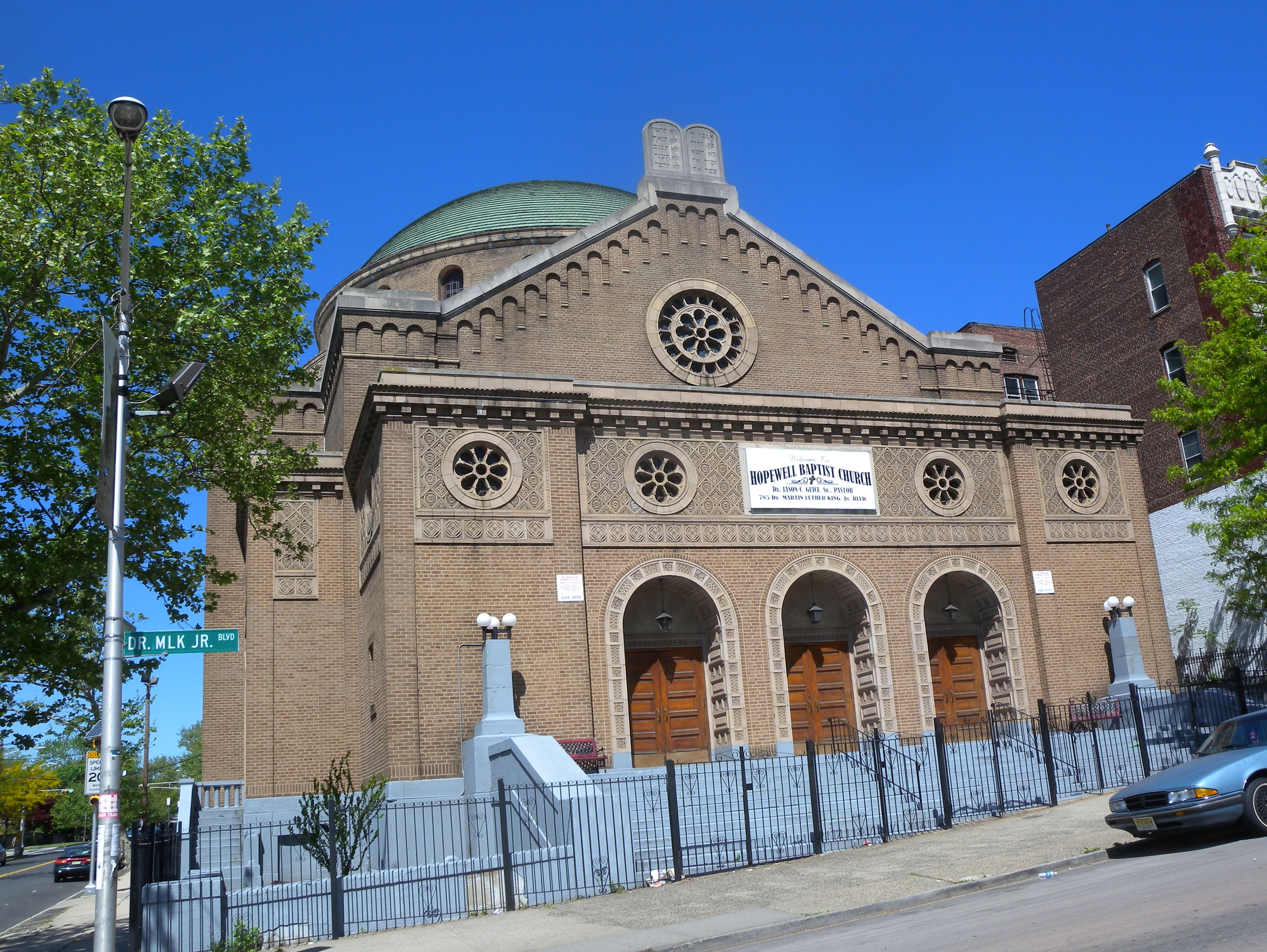
Hopewell Baptist

=== Jewish Gospel singing ===
Nelson is both a Jewish Gospel singer in the tradition of Mahalia Jackson, and a full-time Hebrew teacher in the Hebrew school at Sharey Tefilo-Israel, a Reform synagogue in South Orange, NJ, when he is not on the road. He also serves as director of music at Hopewell Baptist Church in Newark, NJ, which is housed in the building of a former synagogue (the former B’nai Jeshurun).

Nelson has performed with musical legends including Wynton Marsalis and Aretha Franklin and Stephanie Mills and Billy Preston, as well as gospel singers Albertina Walker, the Barrett Sisters, Hezekiah Walker, Kirk Franklin, Dottie Peoples, Dorothy Norwood, Vanessa Bell Armstrong, Timothy Wright, Carlton Pearson, and Bobby Jones & New Life. Nelson also performs frequently with the Jewish Klezmer band The Klezmatics, and performed with the late jazz greats Cab Calloway and Dizzy Gillespie.

Nelson sang before Swedish Prime Minister Göran Persson in 2001, and performed for an audience in Jerusalem that included then-Israeli Prime Minister Ariel Sharon.

=== Film ===
A film was made about Nelson entitled Keep on Walking: Joshua Nelson: The Jewish Gospel Singer (2000). It was voted Best Documentary in the Northampton Film Festival, and won the Best Film Award (the Paul Robeson Award) at the Newark Black Film Festival.

The film aired on PBS and affiliate networks nationally in 2003 and 2004. Internationally it aired on the national networks of Sweden, Denmark, France, Germany, the Netherlands, Japan, Israel, and Italy in 2003 and 2004.

=== TV ===
Nelson's TV credits include “A+ for Kids” on WWOR-TV; “SingSation,” a Gospel program taped in Chicago and broadcast nationally on CBS-TV (1995–97, 2005); and Black Entertainment Television's The Bobby Jones Gospel Hour (1995–2003). Nelson also appeared on The Oprah Winfrey Show, which aired October 2004 and December 2004. Alongside Jamie Foxx, Mr. Nelson was named by Oprah as “The Next Big Thing.”

In 2013, Nelson performed and was interviewed in part four of the BBC documentary The Story of the Jews. It was broadcast in the United Kingdom on BBC Two in September 2013, and in the United States on PBS in March and April 2014.
