= Lorin Sklamberg =

American musician

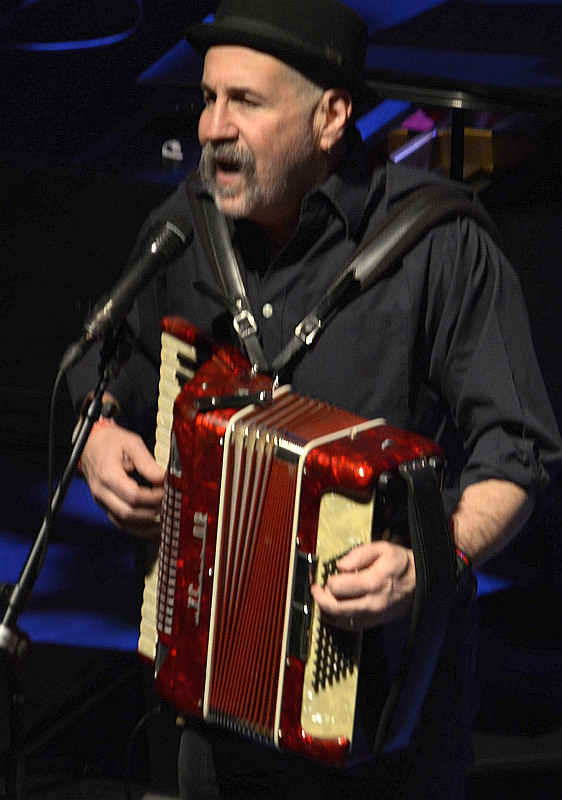
Sklamberg performing in 2015

Lorin Sklamberg is a vocalist, accordionist, pianist, guitarist and founding member of American Klezmer band The Klezmatics. He began performing Jewish music at age fifteen, and moved to New York in the early 1980s to incorporate klezmer into his music.

Prior to New York, Sklamberg was part of the self-described "gay-Jewish-radical faerie folk duo" called Pilshaw and Sklamberg.

In addition to his work with The Klezmatics, Sklamberg works at the YIVO Institute for Jewish Research as their sound archivist.

== Discography ==
With Don Byron

- Don Byron Plays the Music of Mickey Katz (Nonesuch, 1993)
