= Soviet Union =

Country in Eurasia from 1922 to 1991

Union of Soviet Socialist Republics Союз Советских Социалистических Республик
- 1922–1991
- Flag (1955–1991) Emblem (1956–1991)
- Motto: Пролетарии всех стран, соединяйтесь! "Workers of the world, unite!"
- Anthem: Интернационал "The Internationale" (1922–1944); Государственный гимн Союза Советских Социалистических Республик "State Anthem of the Union of Soviet Socialist Republics" (1944–1991)
- The Soviet Union during the Cold War
- Capital and largest city: Moscow; 55°45′N 37°37′E
- Official languages: Russian (Note: De facto, legally since 1990. Constituent republics had the right to declare their own regional languages.)
- Recognized regional languages: Ukrainian; Belarusian; Uzbek; Kazakh; Georgian; Azerbaijani; Lithuanian; Moldavian (Note: The name given to the Romanian language); Latvian; Kyrgyz; Tajik; Armenian; Turkmen; Estonian
- Ethnic groups (1989): 70% East Slavs; 17% Turkic; 13% other
- Religion: Secular state (de jure); State atheism (de facto)
- Demonym: Soviet
- Government: Federal communist state
- Leader
  - 1922–1924 (first): Vladimir Lenin (Note: As chairman of the Council of People's Commissars)
  - 1985–1991 (last): Mikhail Gorbachev (Note: As General Secretary of the Communist Party and President of the Soviet Union)
- Head of State
  - 1922–1946 (first): Mikhail Kalinin (Note: As Chairman of the Central Executive Committee, then as Chairman of the Presidium of the Supreme Soviet)
  - 1988–1991 (last): Mikhail Gorbachev (Note: As General Secretary of the Communist Party and President of the Soviet Union)
- Premier
  - 1922–1924 (first): Vladimir Lenin (Note: As Chairman of the Council of People's Commissars of the Soviet Union and Russian SFSR)
  - 1991 (last): Ivan Silayev (Note: As Chairman of the Committee on the Operational Management of the Soviet Economy)
- Legislature: Congress of Soviets (1922–1936) (Note: Unicameral); Supreme Soviet (1936–1991)
  - Upper house: Soviet of Nationalities (1936–1991) (Note: From 5 September 1991 the Soviet of the Republics)
  - Lower house: Soviet of the Union (1936–1991)
- Historical era: Interwar period; World War II; Cold War
  - October Revolution: 7 November 1917
  - Treaty of Creation: 30 December 1922
  - Great Patriotic War: 1941–1945
  - De-Stalinization: 1953–1956
  - Parade of sovereignties: 1988–1991
  - Formal dissolution: 26 December 1991 (Note: Declaration No. 142-Н of the Soviet of the Republics of the Supreme Soviet of the Soviet Union, formally establishing the dissolution of the Soviet Union as a state and subject of international law (in Russian))

Area
  - Total: 22,402,200 km^{2} (8,649,500 sq mi) (1st)
  - Water: 2,767,198 km^{2} (1,068,421 sq mi)
  - Water (%): 12.3

Population
  - 1989 census: ▲286,730,819 (3rd)
  - Density: 12.7/km^{2} (32.9/sq mi)
- GDP (PPP): 1989 estimate
  - Total: US$2.660 trillion (2nd)
  - Per capita: US$9,211
- GDP (nominal): 1990 estimate
  - Total: руб 1.053 trillion (US$1.780 trillion official exchange rate, US$585 billion commercial-adjusted exchange rate) (Note: Statistics surrounding Soviet GDP are only estimates as the Soviet Union did not use gross domestic product or gross national product to measure its economy until 1990, before which it utilized a system known as the Material Product System.) (7th)
  - Per capita: руб 3,672 (US$6,208 official exchange rate, US$2,040 commercial-adjusted exchange rate)
- Gini (1989): 27.5 low inequality
- HDI (1990 formula): 0.920 very high
- Currency: Soviet ruble (руб) (SUR)
- Time zone: (UTC+2 to +12)
- Calling code: +7
- ISO 3166 code: SU
- Internet TLD: .su (Note: Assigned on 19 September 1990, existing onwards)
Preceded by
Russian SFSR
Ukrainian SSR
Byelorussian SSR
Transcaucasian SFSR
Succeeded by
Russia
and other post-Soviet states
Commonwealth of Independent States
- While parts of the USSR's authority, such as its United Nations seat, were transferred to the Russian Federation, the CIS – an intergovernmental organization – is the successor to the union itself.

The Soviet Union, (Note: Russian: Советский Союз, romanized: Sovetskiy Soyuz, IPA: [sɐˈvʲetskʲɪj sɐˈjus]) officially the Union of Soviet Socialist Republics (Note: For names of the Soviet Union in other official languages, see Official names of the Soviet Union.) (Note: Russian: Союз Советских Социалистических Республик (СССР), romanized: Soyuz Sovetskikh Sotsialisticheskikh Respublik (SSSR), IPA: [sɐˈjus sɐˈvʲetskʲɪx sətsɨəlʲɪˈsʲtʲitɕɪskʲɪx rʲɪˈspublʲɪk].) (USSR), (Note: Russian: СССР, romanized: SSSR.) was a transcontinental country that spanned much of Eurasia from its formation in 1922 until its dissolution in 1991. It was the world's third-most populous country, the largest by area, and bordered twelve other countries. (Note: As of 1989, the countries that bordered the Soviet Union were: Norway and Finland to the northwest; Poland, Czechoslovakia, Hungary and Romania to the west; Turkey and Iran to the southwest; Afghanistan and Mongolia to the south; China and North Korea to the southeast. The Soviet Union also shared maritime boundaries with Japan (which was bordered to the south until 1945) and the United States. The country historically bordered other territories such as Tannu Tuva and areas of Poland annexed by Nazi Germany.) A diverse multinational state, it was organized as a federal union of national republics, with the largest and most populous being the Russian Soviet Federative Socialist Republic (SFSR). (Note: As outlined in Part III of the 1977 Soviet Constitution, "The National-State Structure of the Soviet Union") The world's flagship communist state, it was governed by the Communist Party under Marxism–Leninism, through soviet councils. The Soviet economy was also centrally planned. Its capital and largest city was Moscow.

The Soviet Union's roots lay in the October Revolution of 1917. The new government, led by Vladimir Lenin, established the Russian SFSR, the world's first constitutionally communist state. Following the Bolshevik victory in the Russian Civil War, the Russian SFSR and its subordinate republics were merged into the Soviet Union in 1922. Following Lenin's death in 1924, a six-year power struggle saw Joseph Stalin emerge as the country's undisputed personalist ruler. He initiated rapid industrialization and forced collectivization that led to significant growth, but contributed to a devastating famine in the 1930s that killed millions. The Soviet forced labour camp system, known as the Gulag, was expanded. During the late 1930s, Stalin's government conducted the Great Purge to eliminate opposition, resulting in deportations, executions, and the Moscow trials. Failing to build an anti-Nazi coalition in Europe, the Soviet Union signed a non-aggression pact with Nazi Germany in 1939. However, in 1941, Germany invaded the Soviet Union in the largest land invasion in history, opening the Eastern Front of World War II. The Soviet Union played a decisive role in defeating the Axis powers as part of the Allies, while extending its sphere of influence to Central and Eastern Europe. With around 27 million casualties, it suffered the most deaths of any country in World War II. In the war's aftermath, the Soviet Union consolidated the territories occupied by the Red Army into satellite states and undertook rapid economic development, cementing its status as a superpower.

Geopolitical tensions with the United States led to the Cold War. The US-led Western Bloc coalesced into the NATO military alliance in 1949, prompting the Eastern Bloc to form the Warsaw Pact in 1955. With little direct combat, the blocs engaged in ideological and proxy wars. In 1953, following Stalin's death, Nikita Khrushchev initiated a campaign of de-Stalinization, which led to ideological tensions with communist China, under Mao Zedong, and culminated in an acrimonious split. The Soviet military suppressed uprisings in East Germany, Hungary and Czechoslovakia, while the resolution of the Cuban Missile Crisis narrowly averted a global conflict. Under Leonid Brezhnev, prosperity shifted toward stagnation, although relations with the US eased. In 1985, Mikhail Gorbachev sought reform through his policies of glasnost and perestroika. In 1989, most Warsaw Pact countries overthrew their Soviet-backed regimes, effectively ending the Eastern Bloc. Nationalist movements across the Soviet republics declared sovereignty, and in 1991, a successful referendum to establish a renewed federation was followed by a failed coup by hardliners. This prompted Russia, Ukraine, and Belarus to secede. On 26 December, Gorbachev officially recognized the dissolution of the Soviet Union. Boris Yeltsin, president of the Russian SFSR, oversaw its reconstitution into the Russian Federation, the Soviet Union's successor state. All fifteen republics became independent states; all except the Baltic states joined the Commonwealth of Independent States. The post-Soviet states experienced a humanitarian disaster and continuing wars and insurgencies.

The Soviet Union was one of the world's two superpowers, with hegemony in Eastern Europe, global diplomacy, ideological influence (particularly in the Global South), military might, economic strength, and scientific and technological accomplishments. Its space program made significant achievements in the Space Race. It had the world's second-largest economy and the largest standing military. As a nuclear state, it wielded the largest arsenal of nuclear weapons in the world. As an Allied nation, it was a founding member of the United Nations and one of five permanent members of its Security Council.

== Etymology ==
The word soviet is derived from the Russian word sovet (Russian: совет), meaning "council, assembly, advice", (Note: Ukrainian: рада (rada); Belarusian: савет/рада; Uzbek: совет; Kazakh: совет / кеңес (sovet / kenges); Georgian: საბჭოთა (sabch′ota); Azerbaijani: совет; Lithuanian: taryba; Romanian: soviet (Moldovan Cyrillic: совиет); Latvian: padome; Kyrgyz: совет; Tajik: шӯравӣ / совет (šūravī / sovet); Armenian: խորհուրդ / սովետ (xorhurd / sovet); Turkmen: совет; Estonian: nõukogu.) ultimately deriving from the proto-Slavic verbal stem of *vět-iti ("to inform"), related to Slavic věst ("news") and English wise. The word sovietnik means "councillor". Some organizations in Russian history were called council (Russian: совет). In the Russian Empire, the State Council, which functioned from 1810 to 1917, was referred to as a Council of Ministers.

The soviets as workers' councils first appeared during the 1905 Russian Revolution. Although they were quickly suppressed by the Imperial army, after the February Revolution of 1917, workers' and soldiers' soviets emerged throughout the country and shared power with the Russian Provisional Government. The Bolsheviks, led by Vladimir Lenin, demanded that all power be transferred to the soviets, and gained support from the workers and soldiers. After the October Revolution, in which they seized power from the Provisional Government in the name of the soviets, Lenin proclaimed the formation of the Russian Socialist Federal Soviet Republic (RSFSR).

During the Georgian Affair of 1922, Lenin called for the Russian SFSR and other national soviet republics to form a greater union which he initially named as the Union of Soviet Republics of Europe and Asia (Russian: Союз Советских Республик Европы и Азии, romanized: Soyuz Sovyetskikh Respublik Evropy i Azii). Joseph Stalin initially resisted Lenin's proposal but ultimately accepted it, and with Lenin's agreement he changed the name to the Union of Soviet Socialist Republics (USSR), although all republics began as socialist soviet and did not change to the other order until 1936. In addition, in the regional languages of several republics, the word council or conciliar in the respective language was only quite late changed to an adaptation of the Russian soviet and never in others, e.g. Ukrainian SSR.

СССР (in the Latin alphabet: SSSR) is the abbreviation of the Russian-language cognate of USSR, as written in Cyrillic letters. The soviets used this abbreviation so frequently that audiences worldwide became familiar with its meaning. After this, the most common Russian initialization is Союз ССР (transliteration: Soyuz SSR) which essentially translates to Union of SSRs in English. In addition, the Russian short form name Советский Союз (transliteration: Sovyetsky Soyuz, which literally means Soviet Union) is also commonly used, but only in its unabbreviated form. Since the start of the Great Patriotic War at the latest, abbreviating the Russian name of the Soviet Union as СС has been taboo, the reason being that СС as a Russian Cyrillic abbreviation is associated with the infamous Schutzstaffel of Nazi Germany, as SS is in English. One apparent exception was the Russian abbreviation of the Communist Party of the Soviet Union, КПСС (transliteration: KPSS).

In English-language media, the state was referred to as the Soviet Union or the USSR. The Russian SFSR dominated the Soviet Union to such an extent that, for most of the Soviet Union's existence, it was colloquially, but incorrectly, referred to as Russia.

== History ==
The history of the Soviet Union began with the ideals of the Bolshevik Revolution and ended in dissolution amid economic collapse and political disintegration. Established in 1922 following the Russian Civil War, the Soviet Union became a one-party state under the Communist Party. Its early years under Lenin were marked by the implementation of socialist policies and the New Economic Policy (NEP), which allowed for market-oriented reforms.

The rise of Joseph Stalin in the late 1920s ushered in an era of intense centralization and totalitarianism. Stalin's rule was characterized by the forced collectivization of agriculture, rapid industrialization, and the Great Purge, which eliminated perceived enemies of the state. The Soviet Union, one of the Big Four Allied powers alongside the United States, the United Kingdom, and China, played a crucial role in the Allied victory in World War II. This victory came at a tremendous human cost, with at least 15 million Russian, Ukrainian, and Belarusian civilians killed in the conflict according to some estimates.

The Soviet Union emerged as one of the world's two superpowers, leading the Eastern Bloc in opposition to the Western Bloc during the Cold War. This period saw the USSR engage in an arms race, the Space Race, and proxy wars around the globe. The post-Stalin leadership, particularly under Nikita Khrushchev, initiated a de-Stalinization process, leading to a period of liberalization and relative openness known as the Khrushchev Thaw. However, the subsequent era under Leonid Brezhnev, sometimes referred to as the Era of Stagnation, was marked by economic decline, political corruption, and a rigid gerontocracy. Despite efforts to maintain the Soviet Union's superpower status, the economy struggled due to its centralized nature, technological backwardness, and inefficiencies. The vast military expenditures, and the Eastern Bloc halting embezzlement of its resources; further strained the Soviet economy.

In the 1980s, Mikhail Gorbachev's policies of glasnost (openness) and perestroika (restructuring) aimed to revitalize the Soviet system but instead accelerated its unraveling. Nationalist movements gained momentum across the Soviet republics and the control of the Communist Party weakened. The failed coup attempt in August 1991 against Gorbachev by hardline communists hastened the end of the Soviet Union, which formally dissolved on 26 December 1991, ending nearly seven decades of Soviet rule.

== Geography ==
With an area of 22,402,200 square kilometres (8,649,500 sq mi), the Soviet Union was the world's largest country, a status that is retained by the Russian Federation. Covering a sixth of Earth's land surface, its size was comparable to that of North America. Two other successor states are also very large — Kazakhstan ranks among the top 10 countries by land area, and Ukraine is the largest country entirely in Europe. The European portion accounted for a quarter of the country's area and was the cultural and economic centre. The eastern part in Asia extended to the Pacific Ocean to the east and Afghanistan to the south, and, except some areas in Central Asia, was much less populous. It spanned over 10,000 kilometres (6,200 mi) east to west across 11 time zones, and over 7,200 kilometres (4,500 mi) north to south. It had five climate zones: tundra, taiga, steppes, desert and mountains.

The USSR, like Russia, had the world's longest border, measuring over 60,000 kilometres (37,000 mi), or 1 1/2 circumferences of Earth. Two-thirds of it was a coastline. The country bordered Afghanistan, the People's Republic of China, Czechoslovakia, Finland, Hungary, Iran, Mongolia, North Korea, Norway, Poland, Romania, and Turkey from 1945 to 1991. The Bering Strait separated the USSR from the United States, while the La Pérouse Strait separated it from Japan.

The country's highest mountain was Communism Peak (now Ismoil Somoni Peak) in Tajikistan, at 7,495 metres (24,590 ft). The USSR also included most of the world's largest lakes; the Caspian Sea (shared with Iran), and Lake Baikal, the world's largest (by volume) and deepest freshwater lake that is also an internal body of water in Russia.

=== Environment ===
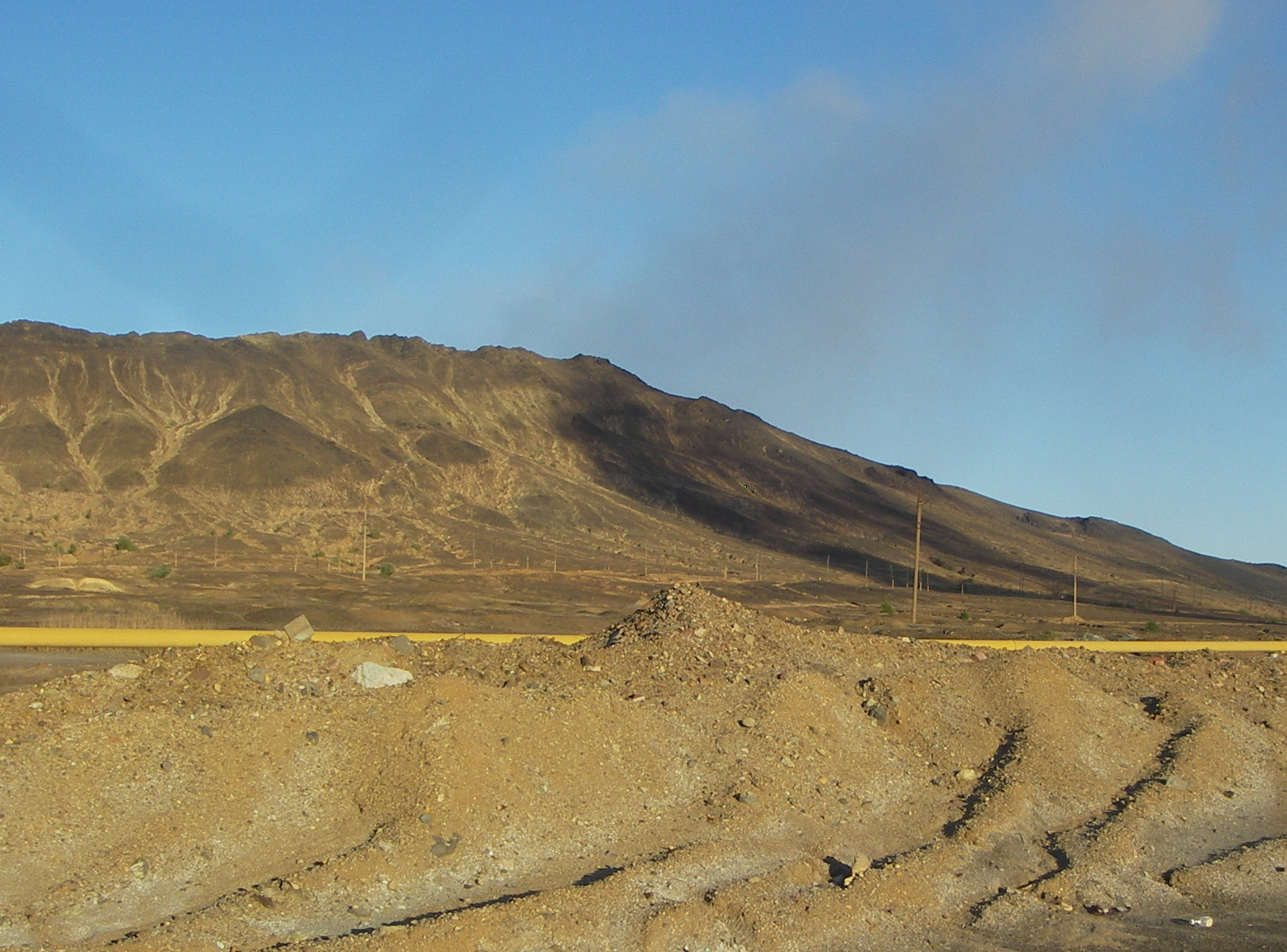
Landscape near Karabash, Chelyabinsk Oblast, an area that was previously covered with forests until acid rainfall from a nearby copper smelter killed all vegetation

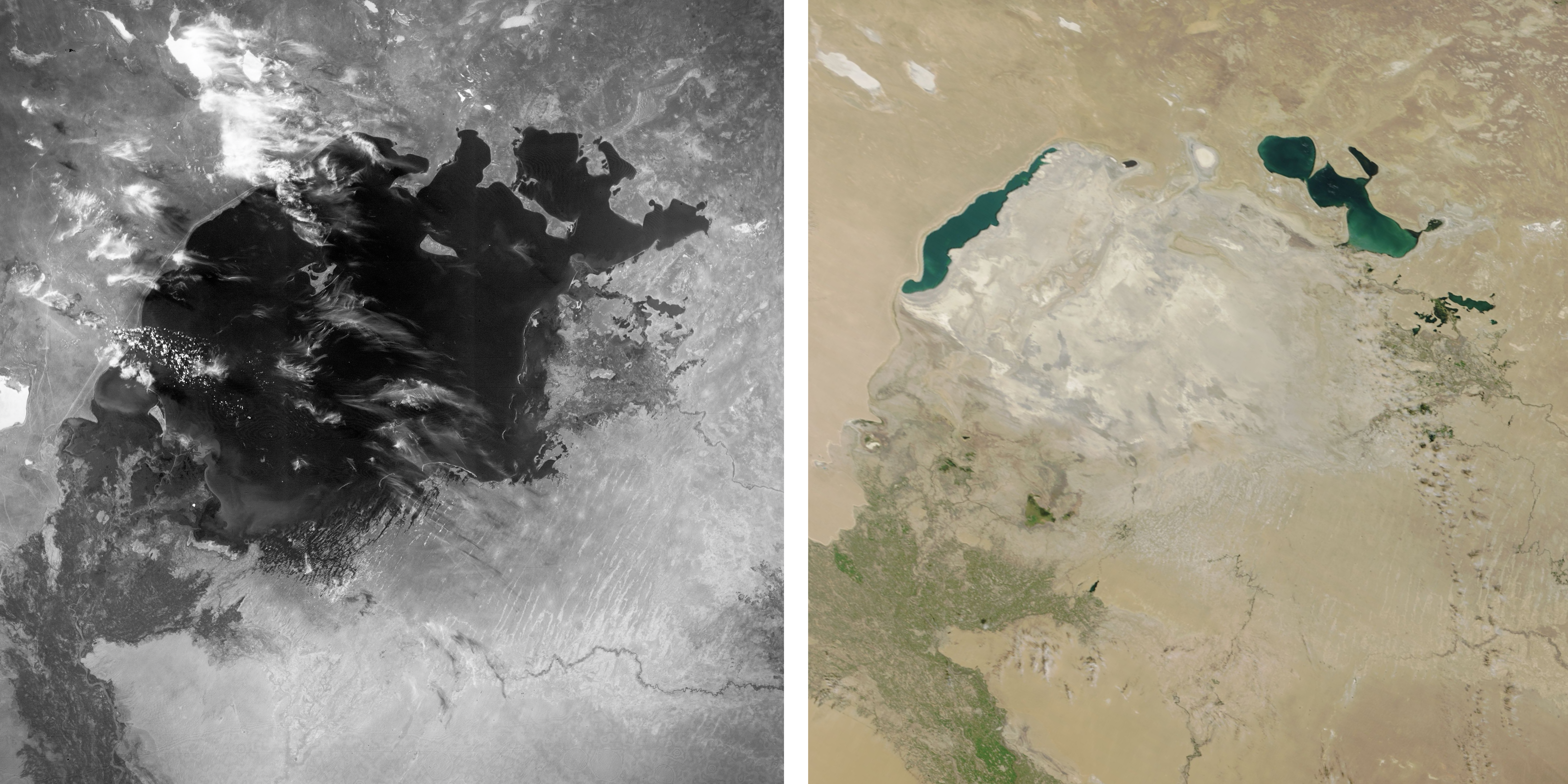
One of the many impacts of the approach to the environment in the USSR and post-Soviet states is the Aral Sea. (Status in August 1964 and August 2026)

Neighbouring countries were aware of the high levels of pollution in the Soviet Union but after the dissolution of the Soviet Union it was discovered that its environmental problems were greater than what the Soviet authorities admitted. The Soviet Union was the world's second-largest producer of harmful emissions. In 1988, total emissions in the Soviet Union were about 79% of those in the United States. But since the Soviet GNP was only 54% of that of the United States, this means that the Soviet Union generated 1.5 times more pollution than the United States per unit of GNP.

The Chernobyl disaster in the Ukrainian SSR in 1986 was the first major accident at a civilian nuclear power plant. Unparalleled in the world, it resulted in a large number of radioactive isotopes being released into the atmosphere. Radioactive doses were scattered relatively far. Although long-term effects of the accident were unknown, 4,000 new cases of thyroid cancer which resulted from the accident's contamination were reported at the time of the accident, but this led to a relatively low number of deaths (WHO data, 2005). The disaster contributed to the socio-economic crises that resulted in the collapse of the Soviet Union. Another major radioactive accident that took place in the USSR was the Kyshtym disaster.

The Kola Peninsula was one of the places with major problems. Around the industrial cities of Monchegorsk and Norilsk, where nickel, for example, is mined, all forests have been destroyed by contamination, while the northern and other parts of Russia have been affected by emissions. During the 1990s, people in the West were also interested in the radioactive hazards of nuclear facilities, decommissioned nuclear submarines, and the processing of nuclear waste or spent nuclear fuel. It was also known in the early 1990s that the USSR had transported radioactive material to the Barents Sea and Kara Sea, which was later confirmed by the Russian parliament. The crash of the K-141 Kursk submarine in 2000 in the west further raised concerns. In the past, there were accidents involving submarines K-19, K-8, a K-129, K-27, K-219 and K-278 Komsomolets.

== Government and politics ==
The Soviet communist state system was based on unified state power and democratic centralism. The highest organ of state authority, the Supreme Soviet of the Soviet Union, stood above all other state organs and worked under the leadership of the Communist Party of the Soviet Union. The executive organ of the state (synonymous with government), the Council of Ministers, was an internal organ of the All-Union Supreme Soviet.

=== Communist Party ===
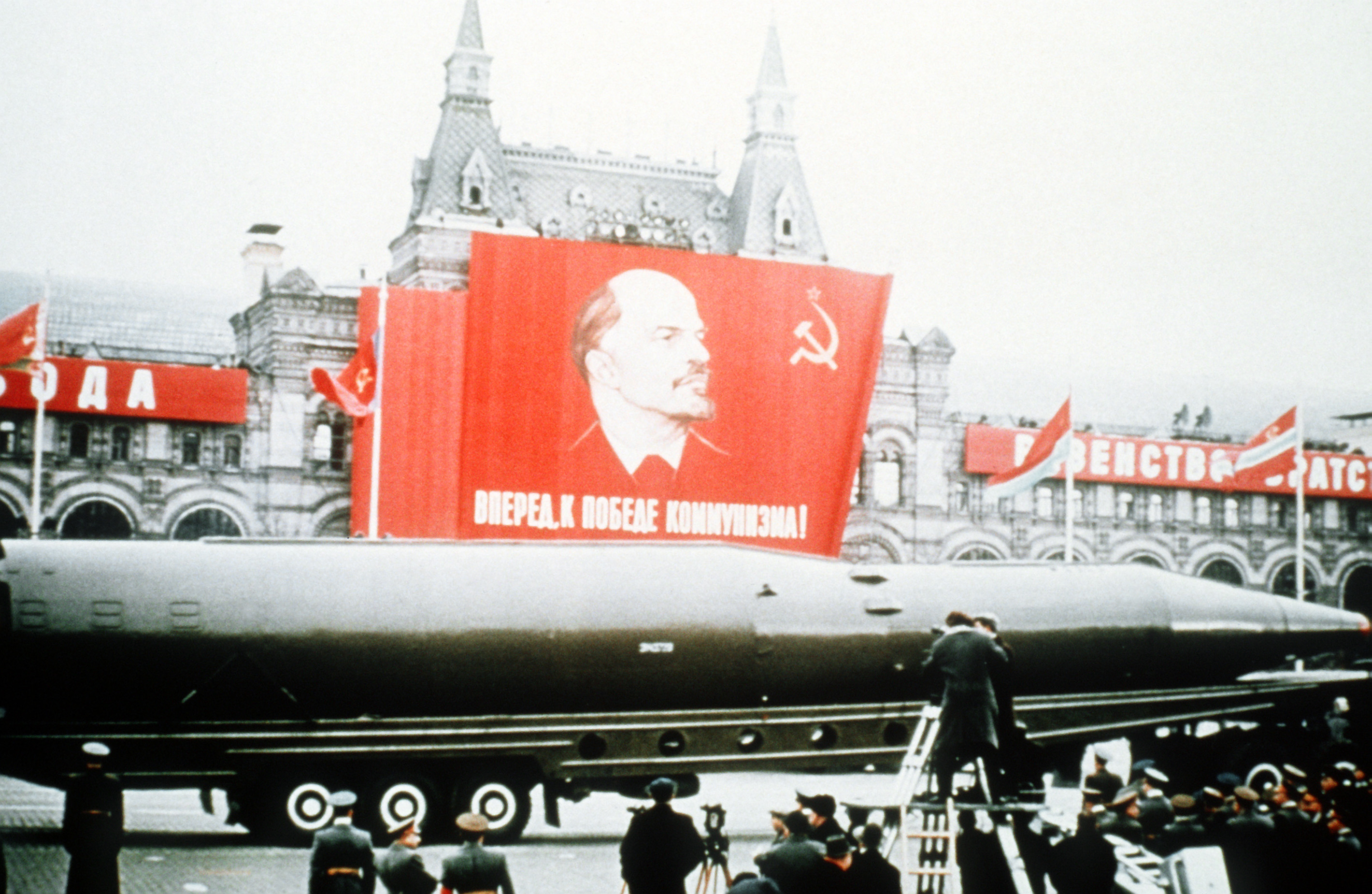
Military parade on the Red Square in Moscow, 7 November 1964

At the top of the Communist Party was the Central Committee, elected at Party Congresses and Conferences. In turn, the Central Committee voted for a Politburo (called the Presidium between 1952 and 1966), Secretariat and the general secretary (First Secretary from 1953 to 1966), the de facto highest office in the Soviet Union. Depending on the degree of power consolidation, it was either the Politburo as a collective body or the General Secretary, who always was one of the Politburo members, that effectively led the party and the country (except for the period of the highly personalized authority of Stalin, exercised directly through his position in the Council of Ministers rather than the Politburo after 1941). They were not controlled by the general party membership, as the key principle of the party organization was democratic centralism, demanding strict subordination to higher bodies, and elections went uncontested, endorsing the candidates proposed from above.

The Communist Party maintained its dominance over the state mainly through its control over the system of appointments. All senior government officials and most deputies of the Supreme Soviet were members of the CPSU. Of the party heads themselves, Stalin (1941–1953) and Khrushchev (1958–1964) were Premiers. Upon the forced retirement of Khrushchev, the party leader was prohibited from this kind of double membership, but the later General Secretaries for at least some part of their tenure occupied the mostly ceremonial position of Chairman of the Presidium of the Supreme Soviet, the nominal head of state. The institutions at lower levels were overseen and at times supplanted by primary party organizations.

However, in practice the degree of control the party was able to exercise over the state bureaucracy, particularly after the death of Stalin, was far from total, with the bureaucracy pursuing different interests that were at times in conflict with the party, nor was the party itself monolithic from top to bottom, although factions were officially banned.

=== Highest organ of state authority ===
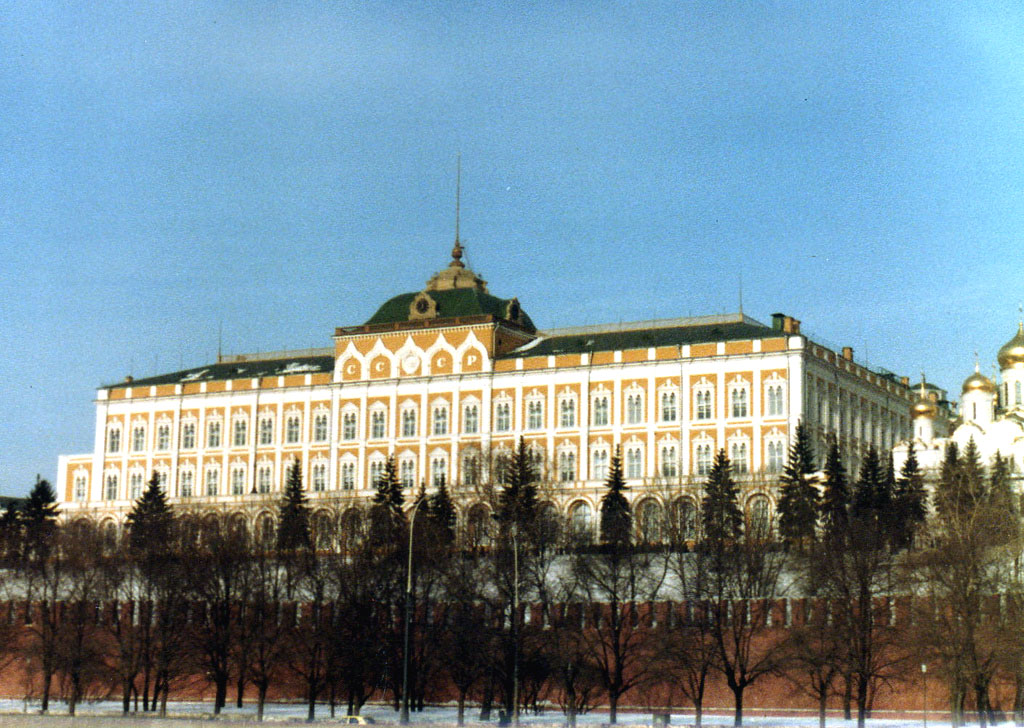
The Grand Kremlin Palace, the seat of the Supreme Soviet of the Soviet Union, 1982

The Supreme Soviet (successor of the Congress of Soviets) was nominally the highest organ of state authority for most of the Soviet history, at first acting as a rubber stamp institution, approving and implementing all decisions made by the party. However, its powers and functions were extended in the late 1950s, 1960s, and 1970s, including the creation of new state commissions and committees. It gained additional powers relating to the approval of the Five-Year Plans and the government budget. The Supreme Soviet elected a Presidium (successor of the Central Executive Committee) to wield its power between plenary sessions, ordinarily held twice a year, and appointed the Supreme Court, the Procurator General and the Council of Ministers (known before 1946 as the Council of People's Commissars), headed by the Chairman (Premier) and managing an enormous bureaucracy responsible for the administration of the economy and society. State and party structures of the constituent republics largely emulated the structure of the central institutions, although the Russian SFSR, unlike the other constituent republics, for most of its history had no republican branch of the CPSU, being ruled directly by the union-wide party until 1990. Local authorities were organized likewise into party committees, local Soviets and executive committees. While the state was a de jure federation with a nominally federal constitution, the party was de facto centralized and unitary.

The state security police (the KGB and its predecessor agencies) played an important role in Soviet politics. It was instrumental in the Red Terror and Great Purge, but was brought under strict party control after Stalin's death. Under Yuri Andropov, the KGB engaged in the suppression of political dissent and maintained an extensive network of informers, reasserting itself as a political actor to some extent independent of the party-state structure, culminating in the anti-corruption campaign targeting high-ranking party officials in the late 1970s and early 1980s.

=== Unified power and reform ===
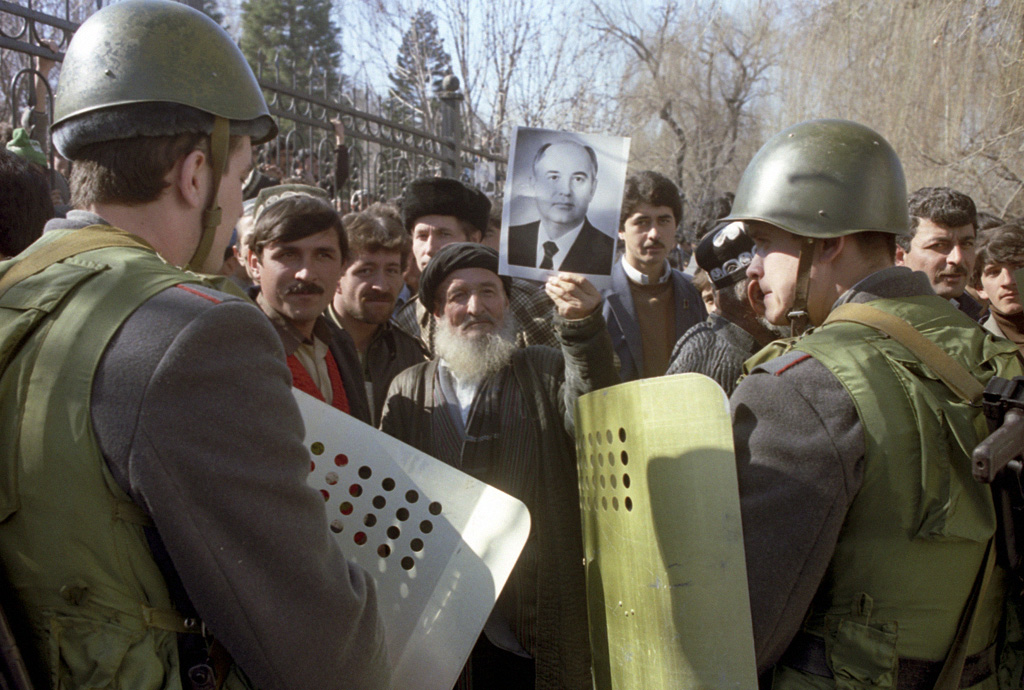
Nationalist anti-government riots in Dushanbe, Tajikistan, 1990

The constitution, which was promulgated in 1924, 1936 and 1977, did not limit state power. No separation of powers existed in the Soviet Union, as the state system was based on the unified state power of the highest organ of state authority, that is, the All-Union Supreme Soviet which worked under the party's leadership. The system was governed less by statute than by informal conventions, and no settled mechanism of leadership succession existed. Bitter and at times deadly power struggles took place in the Politburo after the deaths of Lenin and Stalin, as well as after Khrushchev's dismissal, itself due to a decision by both the Politburo and the Central Committee. All leaders of the Communist Party before Gorbachev died in office, except Georgy Malenkov and Khrushchev, who were both dismissed from the party leadership amid internal struggle within the party.

Between 1988 and 1990, facing considerable opposition, Mikhail Gorbachev enacted reforms shifting power away from the highest bodies of the party and making the Supreme Soviet less dependent on them. The Congress of People's Deputies was established, the majority of whose members were directly elected in competitive elections held in March 1989, the first in Soviet history. The Congress now elected the Supreme Soviet, which became a full-time parliament, and much stronger than before. For the first time since the 1920s, it refused to rubber stamp proposals from the party and Council of Ministers, and the country began operating as a parliamentary republic. In 1990, Gorbachev introduced and assumed the position of the President of the Soviet Union, concentrated power in his executive office, independent of the party, and subordinated the government, now renamed the Cabinet of Ministers of the USSR, to himself, creating a semi-presidential system.

Tensions grew between the Union-wide authorities under Gorbachev, reformists led in Russia by Boris Yeltsin and controlling the newly elected Supreme Soviet of the Russian SFSR, and communist hardliners. On 19–21 August 1991, a group of hardliners staged a coup attempt. The coup failed, and the State Council of the Soviet Union became the highest organ of state power "in the period of transition". Gorbachev resigned as General Secretary, remaining President only for the final months of the existence of the USSR.

=== Judicial system ===
The judiciary was not independent of the supreme state organ of power, and the Supreme Court as the supreme judicial organ supervised the lower courts (People's Court) and applied the law as established by the constitution or as interpreted by the Supreme Soviet. The Constitutional Oversight Committee reviewed the constitutionality of laws and acts. The Soviet Union used the inquisitorial system of Roman law, where the judge, procurator, and defence attorney collaborate to "establish the truth".

=== Human rights ===
Human rights in the Soviet Union were severely limited. The Soviet Union was a totalitarian state from 1927 until 1953 and a one-party state until 1990. Freedom of speech was suppressed and dissent was punished. Independent political activities were not tolerated, whether these involved participation in free labour unions, private corporations, independent churches or opposition political parties. The freedom of movement within and especially outside the country was limited. The state restricted rights of citizens to private property.

According to the Universal Declaration of Human Rights, human rights are the "basic rights and freedoms to which all humans are entitled." including the right to life and liberty, freedom of expression, and equality before the law; and social, cultural and economic rights, including the right to participate in culture, the right to food, the right to work, and the right to education.

The Soviet conception of human rights was very different from international law. According to Soviet legal theory, "it is the government who is the beneficiary of human rights which are to be asserted against the individual". The Soviet state was considered as the source of human rights. Therefore, the Soviet legal system considered law an arm of politics and it also considered courts agencies of the government. Extensive extrajudicial powers were given to the Soviet secret police agencies. In practice, the Soviet government significantly curbed the rule of law, civil liberties, protection of law and guarantees of property, which were considered as examples of "bourgeois morality" by Soviet law theorists such as Andrey Vyshinsky.

The USSR and other countries in the Soviet Bloc had abstained from affirming the Universal Declaration of Human Rights (1948), saying that it was "overly juridical" and potentially infringed on national sovereignty. The Soviet Union later signed legally-binding human rights documents, such as the International Covenant on Civil and Political Rights in 1973 (and the 1966 International Covenant on Economic, Social and Cultural Rights), but they were neither widely known or accessible to people living under Communist rule, nor were they taken seriously by the Communist authorities. Under Joseph Stalin, the death penalty was extended to adolescents as young as 12 years old in 1935.

Sergei Kovalev recalled "the famous article 125 of the Constitution which enumerated all basic civil and political rights" in the Soviet Union. But when he and other prisoners attempted to use this as a legal basis for their abuse complaints, their prosecutor's argument was that "the Constitution was written not for you, but for American Negroes, so that they know how happy the lives of Soviet citizens are".

Crime was determined not as the infraction of law, instead, it was determined as any action which could threaten the Soviet state and society. For example, a desire to make a profit could be interpreted as a counter-revolutionary activity punishable by death. The liquidation and deportation of millions of peasants in 1928–31 was carried out within the terms of the Soviet Civil Code. Some Soviet legal scholars even said that "criminal repression" may be applied in the absence of guilt. Martin Latsis, chief of Soviet Ukraine's secret police explained: "Do not look in the file of incriminating evidence to see whether or not the accused rose up against the Soviets with arms or words. Ask him instead to which class he belongs, what is his background, his education, his profession. These are the questions that will determine the fate of the accused. That is the meaning and essence of the Red Terror."

The purpose of public trials was "not to demonstrate the existence or absence of a crime – that was predetermined by the appropriate party authorities – but to provide yet another forum for political agitation and propaganda for the instruction of the citizenry (see Moscow Trials for example). Defense lawyers, who had to be party members, were required to take their client's guilt for granted..."

=== Foreign relations ===
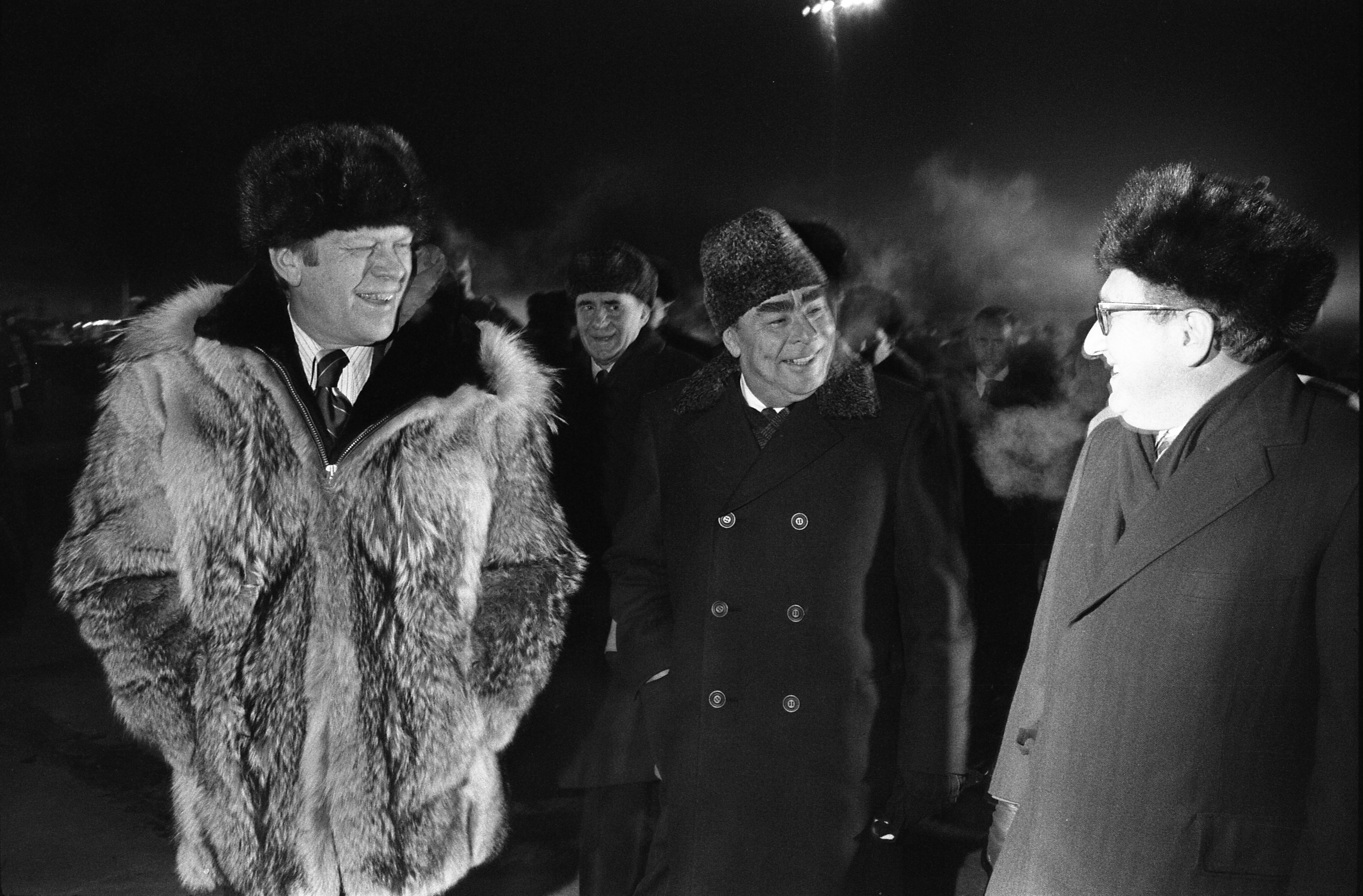
Gerald Ford, Andrei Gromyko, Leonid Brezhnev and Henry Kissinger speaking informally at the Vladivostok Summit in 1974

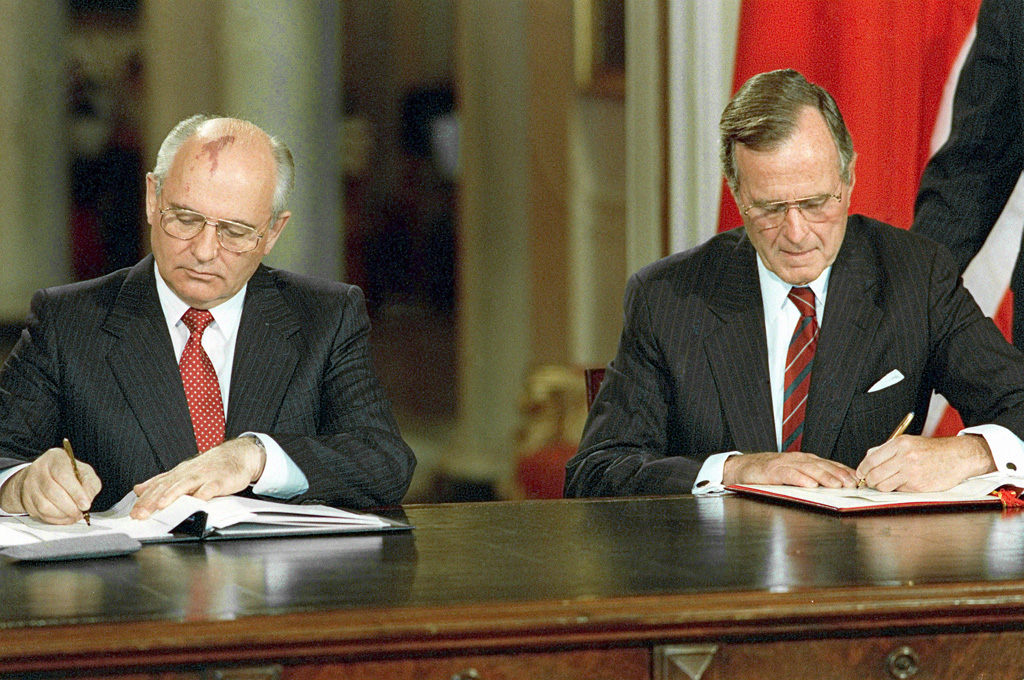
Mikhail Gorbachev and George H. W. Bush signing bilateral documents during Gorbachev's official visit to the United States in 1990

During his rule, Stalin always made the final policy decisions. Otherwise, Soviet foreign policy was set by the commission on the Foreign Policy of the Central Committee of the Communist Party of the Soviet Union, or by the party's highest body the Politburo. Operations were handled by the separate Ministry of Foreign Affairs. It was known as the People's Commissariat for Foreign Affairs (or Narkomindel), until 1946. The most influential spokesmen were Georgy Chicherin, Maxim Litvinov, Vyacheslav Molotov, Andrey Vyshinsky, and Andrei Gromyko. Intellectuals were based in the Moscow State Institute of International Relations.

- Comintern (1919–1943), or Communist International, was an international communist organization based in the Kremlin that advocated world communism. The Comintern intended to 'struggle by all available means, including armed force, for the overthrow of the international bourgeoisie and the creation of an international Soviet republic as a transition stage to the complete abolition of the state'. It was abolished as a conciliatory measure toward Britain and the United States.
- Comecon, the Council for Mutual Economic Assistance (Russian: Совет Экономической Взаимопомощи, Sovet Ekonomicheskoy Vzaimopomoshchi, СЭВ, SEV) was an economic organization from 1949 to 1991 under Soviet control that comprised the countries of the Eastern Bloc along with several communist states elsewhere in the world. Moscow was concerned about the Marshall Plan, and Comecon was meant to prevent countries in the Soviets' sphere of influence from moving towards that of the Americans and Southeast Asia. Comecon was the Eastern Bloc's reply to the formation in Western Europe of the Organization for European Economic Co-Operation (OEEC),
- The Warsaw Pact was a collective defence alliance formed in 1955 among the USSR and its satellite states in Eastern Europe during the Cold War. The Warsaw Pact was the military complement to the Comecon, the regional economic organization for the socialist states of Central and Eastern Europe. The Warsaw Pact was created in reaction to the integration of West Germany into NATO. Although nominally a "defensive" alliance, the Pact's primary function was to safeguard the Soviet Union's hegemony over its Eastern European satellites, with the Pact's only direct military actions having been the invasions of its own member states to keep them from breaking away.
- The Cominform (1947–1956), informally the Communist Information Bureau and officially the Information Bureau of the Communist and Workers' Parties, was the first official agency of the international Marxist-Leninist movement since the dissolution of the Comintern in 1943. Its role was to coordinate actions between Marxist-Leninist parties under Soviet direction. Stalin used it to order Western European communist parties to abandon their exclusively parliamentarian line and instead concentrate on politically impeding the operations of the Marshall Plan, the U.S. program of rebuilding Europe after the war and developing its economy. It also coordinated international aid to Marxist-Leninist insurgents during the Greek Civil War in 1947–1949. It expelled Yugoslavia in 1948 after Josip Broz Tito insisted on an independent program. Its newspaper, For a Lasting Peace, for a People's Democracy!, promoted Stalin's positions. The Cominform's concentration on Europe meant a deemphasis on world revolution in Soviet foreign policy. By enunciating a uniform ideology, it allowed the constituent parties to focus on personalities rather than issues.

==== Early policies (1919–1939) ====
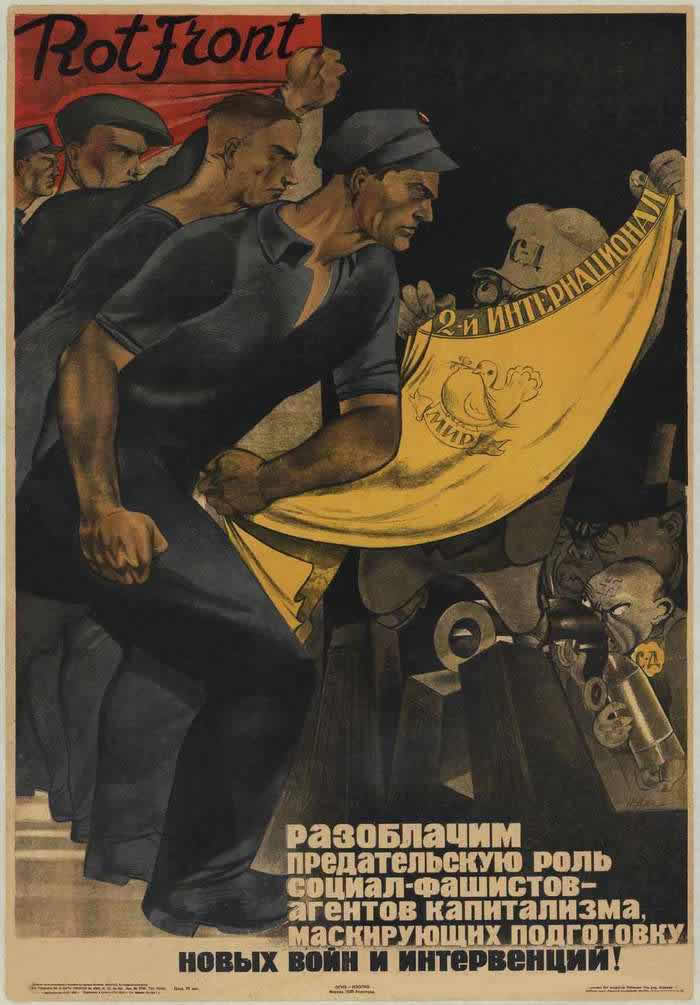
A Soviet propaganda poster denounces "social fascism".

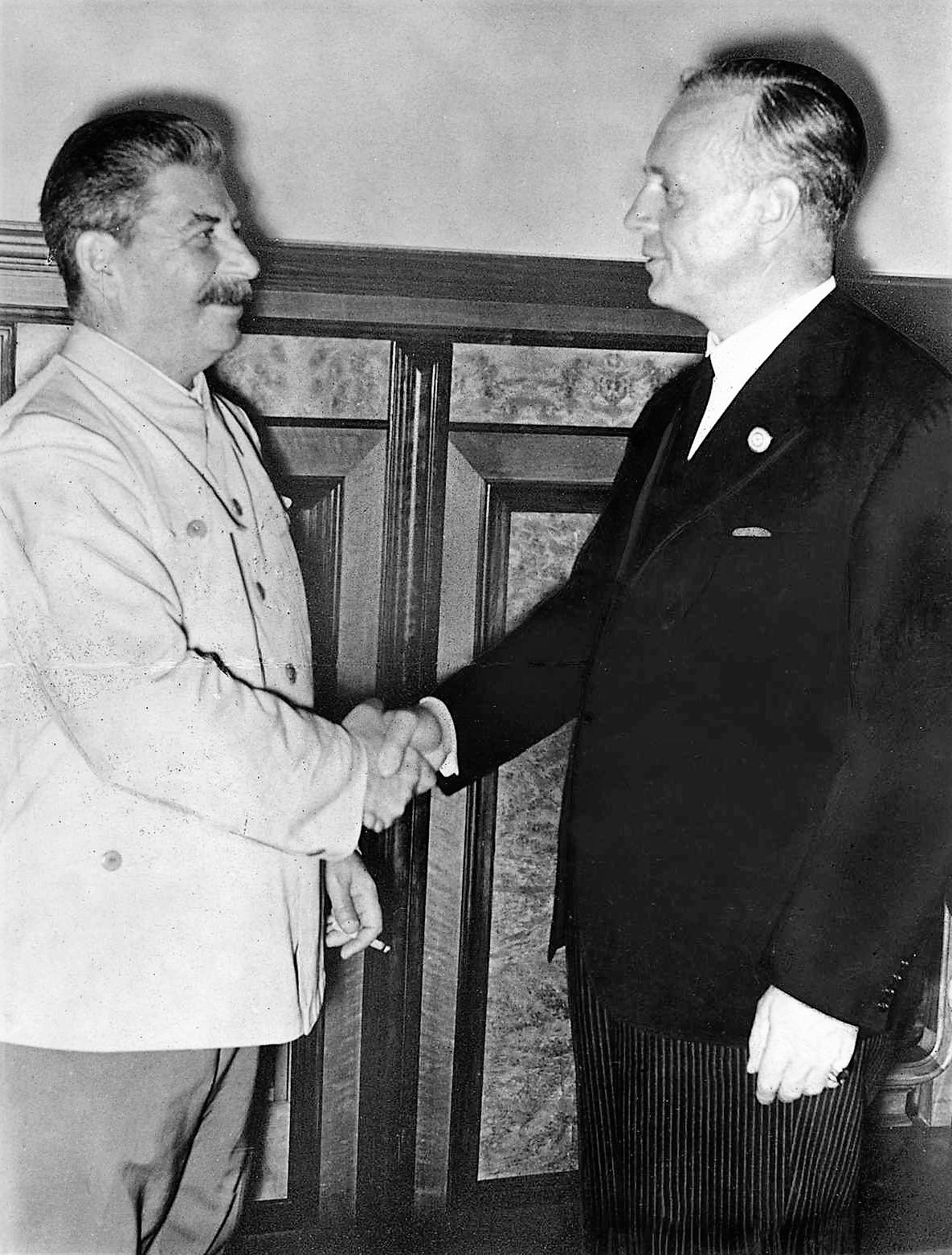
Joseph Stalin and Joachim von Ribbentrop exchange a handshake after signing the Molotov–Ribbentrop Pact.

The Marxist-Leninist leadership of the Soviet Union intensely debated foreign policy issues and changed directions several times. Even after Stalin assumed dictatorial control in the late 1920s, there were debates, and he frequently changed positions.

During the country's early period, it was assumed that Communist revolutions would break out soon in every major industrial country, and it was the Russian responsibility to assist them. The Comintern was the weapon of choice. A few revolutions did break out, but they were quickly suppressed (the longest lasting one was in Hungary)—the Hungarian Soviet Republic—lasted only from 21 March 1919 to 1 August 1919. The Russian Bolsheviks were in no position to give any help.

By 1921, Lenin, Trotsky, and Stalin realized that capitalism had stabilized itself in Europe and there would not be any widespread revolutions anytime soon. It became the duty of the Russian Bolsheviks to protect what they had in Russia, and avoid military confrontations that might destroy their bridgehead. Russia was now a pariah state, along with Germany. The two came to terms in 1922 with the Treaty of Rapallo that settled long-standing grievances. At the same time, the two countries secretly set up training programs for the illegal German army and air force operations at hidden camps in the USSR.

Moscow eventually stopped threatening other states, and instead worked to open peaceful relationships in terms of trade, and diplomatic recognition. The United Kingdom dismissed the warnings of Winston Churchill and a few others about a continuing Marxist-Leninist threat, and opened trade relations and de facto diplomatic recognition in 1922. There was hope for a settlement of the pre-war Tsarist debts, but it was repeatedly postponed. Formal recognition came when the new Labour Party came to power in 1924. All the other countries followed suit in opening trade relations. Henry Ford opened large-scale business relations with the Soviets in the late 1920s, hoping that it would lead to long-term peace. Finally, in 1933, the United States officially recognized the USSR, a decision backed by the public opinion and especially by US business interests that expected an opening of a new profitable market.

In the late 1920s and early 1930s, Stalin ordered Marxist-Leninist parties across the world to strongly oppose non-Marxist political parties, labour unions or other organizations on the left, which they labelled social fascists. In the usage of the Soviet Union, and of the Comintern and its affiliated parties in this period, the epithet fascist was used to describe capitalist society in general and virtually any anti-Soviet or anti-Stalinist activity or opinion. Stalin reversed himself in 1934 with the Popular Front program that called on all Marxist parties to join with all anti-Fascist political, labour, and organizational forces that were opposed to fascism, especially of the Nazi variety.

The rapid growth of power in Nazi Germany encouraged both Paris and Moscow to form a military alliance, and the Franco-Soviet Treaty of Mutual Assistance was signed in May 1935. A firm believer in collective security, Stalin's foreign minister Maxim Litvinov worked very hard to form a closer relationship with France and Britain.

In 1939, half a year after the Munich Agreement, the USSR attempted to form an anti-Nazi alliance with France and Britain. Adolf Hitler proposed a better deal, which would give the USSR control over much of Eastern Europe through the Molotov–Ribbentrop Pact. In September, Germany invaded Poland, and the USSR also invaded later that month, resulting in the partition of Poland. In response, Britain and France declared war on Germany, marking the beginning of World War II.

==== World War II (1939–1945) ====
Up until his death in 1953, Joseph Stalin controlled all foreign relations of the Soviet Union during the interwar period. Despite the increasing build-up of Germany's war machine and the outbreak of the Second Sino-Japanese War, the Soviet Union did not cooperate with any other nation, choosing to follow its own path. However, after Operation Barbarossa, the Soviet Union's priorities changed. Despite previous conflict with the United Kingdom, Vyacheslav Molotov dropped his post war border demands.

==== Cold War (1945–1991) ====
The Cold War was a period of geopolitical tension between the United States and the Soviet Union and their respective allies, the Western Bloc and the Eastern Bloc, which began following World War II in 1945. The term cold war is used because there was no large-scale fighting directly between the two superpowers, but they each supported major regional conflicts known as proxy wars. The conflict was based around the ideological and geopolitical struggle for global influence by these two superpowers, following their temporary alliance and victory against Nazi Germany in 1945. Aside from the nuclear arsenal development and conventional military deployment, the struggle for dominance was expressed via indirect means such as psychological warfare, propaganda campaigns, espionage, far-reaching embargoes, rivalry at sports events and technological competitions such as the Space Race.

=== Administrative divisions ===
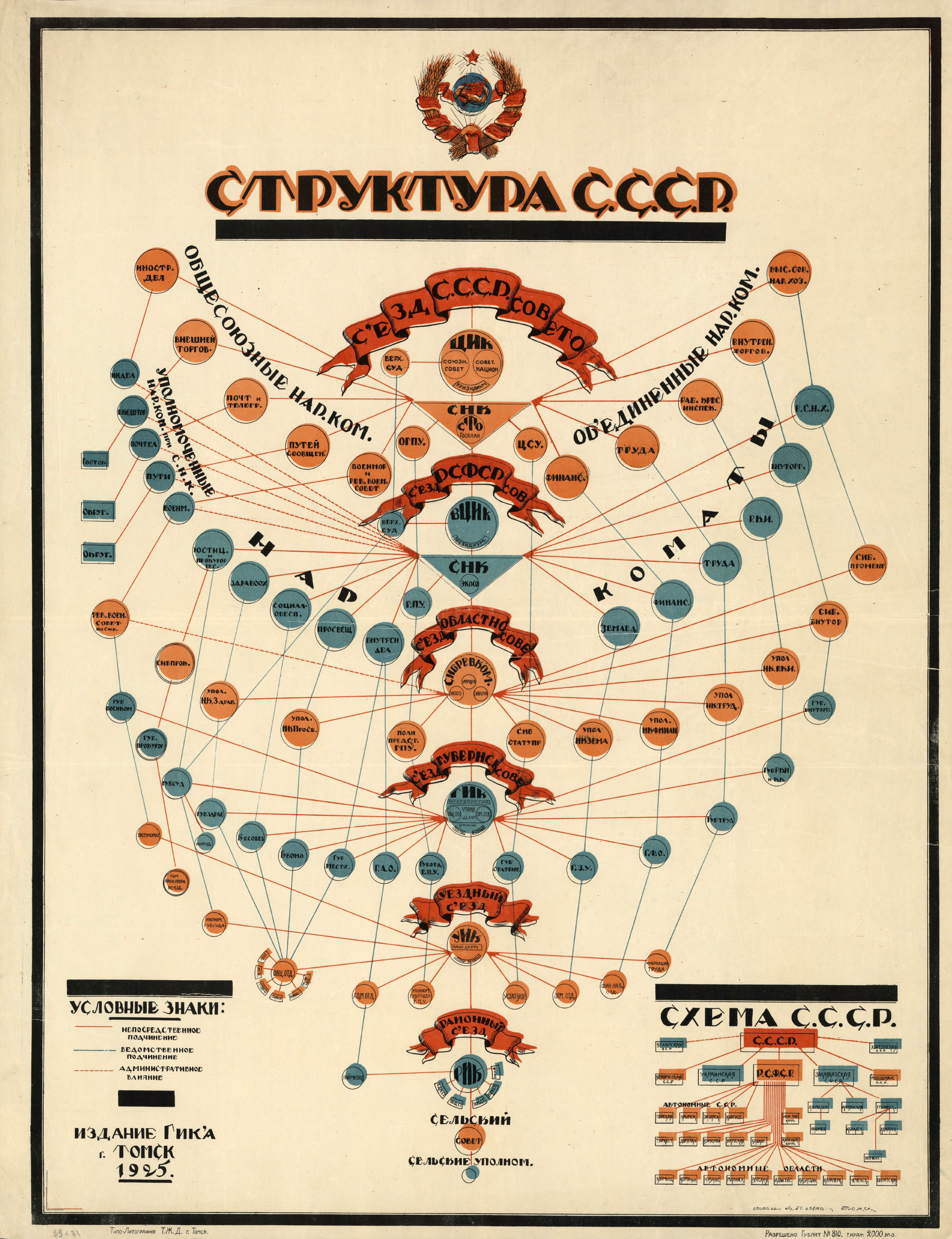
Structure of the Union of the Soviet Socialist Republics (1925)

Constitutionally, the USSR was a federation of constituent Union Republics, which were either unitary states, such as Ukraine or Byelorussia (SSRs), or federations, such as Russia or Transcaucasia (SFSRs), all four being the founding republics who signed the Treaty on the Creation of the USSR in December 1922. In 1924, during the national delimitation in Central Asia, Uzbekistan and Turkmenistan were formed from parts of Russia's Turkestan ASSR and two Soviet dependencies, the Khorezm and Bukharan PSPs. In 1929, Tajikistan was split off from the Uzbekistan SSR. With the constitution of 1936, the Transcaucasian SFSR was dissolved, resulting in its constituent republics of Armenia, Georgia and Azerbaijan being elevated to Union Republics, while Kazakhstan and Kirghizia were split off from the Russian SFSR, resulting in the same status. In August 1940, Moldavia was formed from parts of Ukraine and Soviet-occupied Bessarabia, and Ukrainian SSR. Estonia, Latvia and Lithuania were also annexed by the Soviet Union and turned into SSRs, which was not recognized by most of the international community and was considered an illegal occupation. After the Soviet invasion of Finland, the Karelo-Finnish SSR was formed on annexed territory as a Union Republic in March 1940 and then incorporated into Russia as the Karelian ASSR in 1956. Between July 1956 and September 1991, there were 15 union republics (see map below).

Republic		Map of the Union Republics between 1956 and 1991
1	Russian SFSR	
2	Ukrainian SSR	
3	Byelorussian SSR	
4	Uzbek SSR	
5	Kazakh SSR	
6	Georgian SSR	
7	Azerbaijan SSR	
8	Lithuanian SSR	
9	Moldavian SSR	
10	Latvian SSR	
11	Kirghiz SSR	
12	Tajik SSR	
13	Armenian SSR	
14	Turkmen SSR	
15	Estonian SSR	

== Military ==
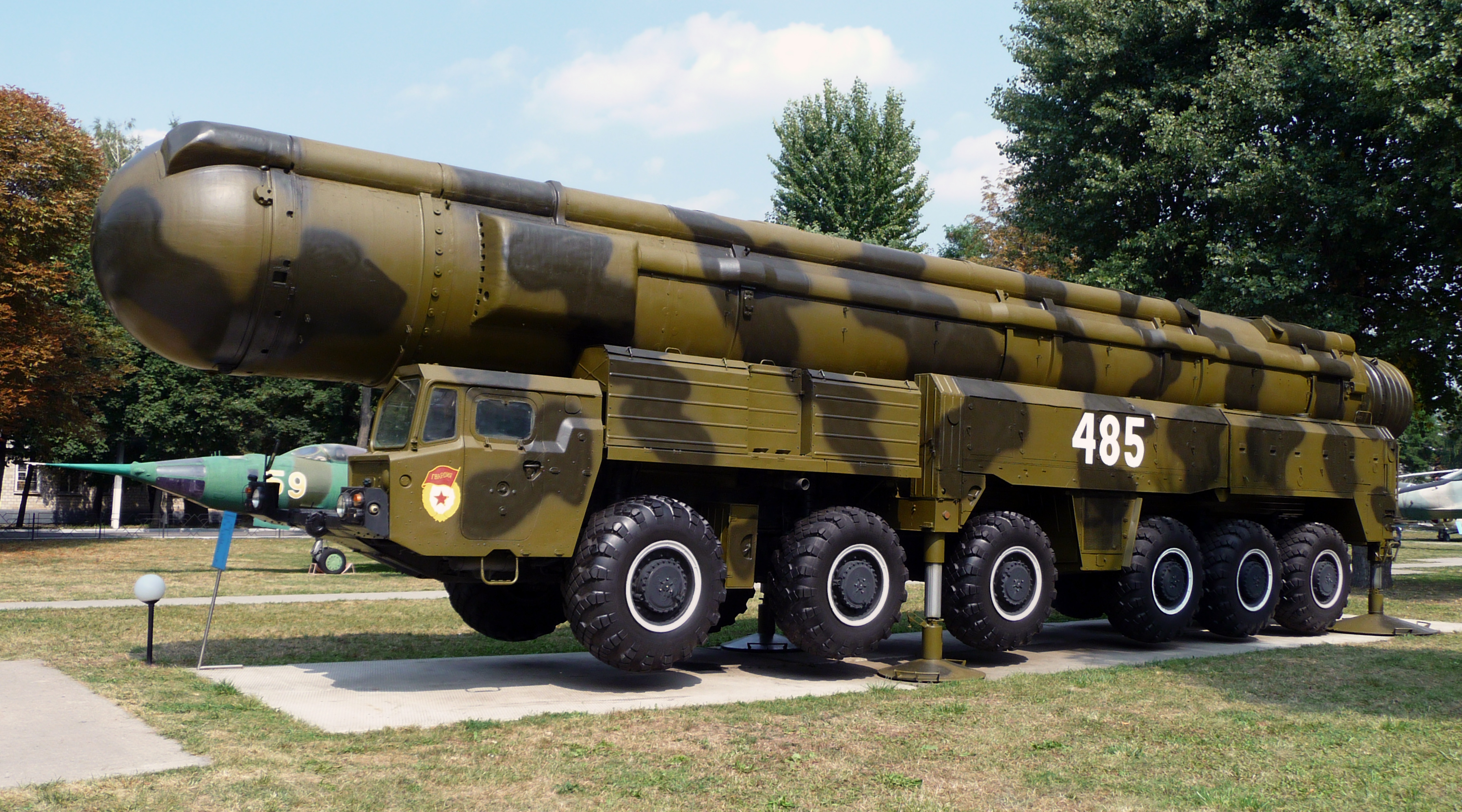
A medium-range SS-20 non-ICBM ballistic missile, the deployment of which by the Soviet Union in the late 1970s launched a new arms race in Europe when NATO responded by deploying Pershing II missiles in West Germany, among other things.

Under the Military Law of September 1925, the Soviet Armed Forces consisted of the Land Forces, the Red Army Air Force, the Navy, Joint State Political Directorate (OGPU) and the Internal Troops. The OGPU later became independent and in 1934 joined the NKVD secret police, and so its internal troops were under the joint leadership of the defence and internal commissariats. After World War II, Strategic Missile Forces (1959), Air Defense Forces (1948) and National Civil Defense Forces (1970) were formed, which ranked first, third, and sixth in the official Soviet system of importance (ground forces were second, Air Force fourth, and Navy fifth).

The army had the greatest political influence. In 1989, there served two million soldiers divided between 150 motorized and 52 tank divisions. Until the early 1960s, the Soviet navy was a rather small military branch, but after the Cuban Missile Crisis, under the leadership of Sergei Gorshkov, it expanded significantly. It became known for its submarine fleet. In 1989, there served 500,000 men. The Soviet Air Force focused on a fleet of strategic bombers and during war situation was to eradicate enemy infrastructure and nuclear capacity. The air force also had a number of fighters and tactical bombers to support the army in the war. Strategic missile forces had more than 1,400 intercontinental ballistic missiles (ICBMs), deployed between 28 bases and 300 command centres.

After 1945, the Soviet Ground Forces suppressed several uprisings in East Europe and was involved in many other operations abroad. These included the suppression of the uprising in East Germany (1953), Hungarian revolution (1956) and the invasion of Czechoslovakia (1968). The Soviet Union also began the war in Afghanistan between 1979 and 1989.

In the Soviet Union, general conscription applied, meaning all able-bodied males aged 18 and older were drafted in the armed forces.

=== WMD ===
By the end of the Cold War, the Soviet Armed Forces maintained the world's largest arsenals of nuclear, chemical, and biological weapons. As dissolution seemed imminent, the United States initiated the Nunn–Lugar Cooperative Threat Reduction program to dismantle much of this Soviet infrastructure and secure its personnel and materials.

The Soviet Union had the largest nuclear weapons arsenal ever, peaking at over 40,000 warheads in 1986. The country was the second to develop nuclear weapons, conducting its first test RDS-1 in 1949, four years after the US Trinity test. Its primary nuclear testing sites were Semipalatinsk, Novaya Zemlya, and Kapustin Yar. By 1991, it deployed over 10,000 strategic nuclear weapons in its nuclear triad: Strategic Rocket Forces' silo-based and road-mobile intercontinental ballistic missiles, the Soviet Navy's submarine-launched ballistic missiles, and Long Range Aviation's Tu-95MS and Tu-160 bombers. Another 11,000 tactical nuclear weapons were assigned to land and naval tactical aircraft, missiles, nuclear artillery, and anti-submarine weapons.

The Soviet chemical weapons program became the largest in world history. Russia in 1993 declared 39,967 tons of chemical weapons. The program produced Novichok, VR, sarin, and soman nerve agents, as well as lewisite, mustard, and phosgene, and others. By comparison, 27,770 metric tons were declared for the United States chemical weapons program in 1997. By the time of the Soviet Union's dissolution in 1991, its research institute, GosNIIOKhT, employed around 6,000 people across Russia and Uzbekistan. Novichok agents were designed to be undetectable and unprotectable by NATO equipment, safer to handle, and circumvent the forthcoming Chemical Weapons Convention list of controlled precursors.

The Soviet biological weapons program was the world's largest, longest, and most sophisticated biological warfare project. It weaponized and stockpiled the biological agents that cause anthrax, plague, tularemia, smallpox, botulism and others. Genetic engineering improved agent stability and antibiotic resistance. A civilian cover organization named Biopreparat operated forty or fifty military-purposed biological research facilities. An anti-agriculture program, Ekologiya, targeted crops and livestock. The program employed a peak of 65,000 people and annually produced, for example, 100 tons of smallpox. The Sverdlovsk anthrax leak, which led to at least 68 deaths, began to reveal the extent of the program, continued by defectors including Ken Alibek and Vladimir Pasechnik.

== Economy ==
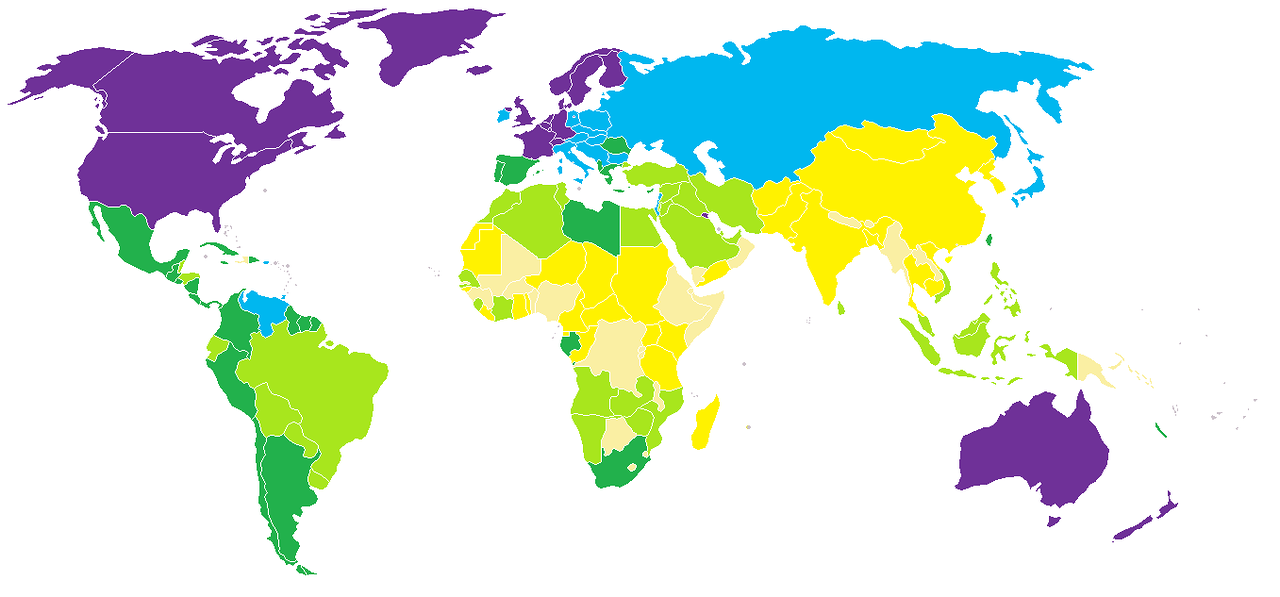
The Soviet Union in comparison to other countries by GDP (nominal) per capita in 1965 based on a West-German school book (1971): > 5,000 DM 2,500–5,000 DM 1,000–2,500 DM / 500–1,000 DM 250–500 DM < 250 DM

The Soviet Union adopted a command economy, whereby production and distribution of goods were centralized and directed by the government. For the overwhelming majority of its existence, the USSR did not use GDP or GNP to measure its economy, instead relying on the Material Product System. The first Bolshevik experience with a command economy was the policy of war communism, which involved the nationalization of industry, centralized distribution of output, coercive or forced requisition of agricultural production, and attempts to eliminate money circulation, private enterprises and free trade. The barrier troops were also used to enforce Bolshevik control over food supplies in areas controlled by the Red Army, a role which soon earned them the hatred of the Russian civilian population. After the severe economic collapse, Lenin replaced war communism by the New Economic Policy (NEP) in 1921, legalizing free trade and private ownership of small businesses. The economy steadily recovered as a result.

After a long debate among the members of the Politburo about the course of economic development, by 1928–1929, upon gaining control of the country, Stalin abandoned the NEP and pushed for full central planning, starting forced collectivization of agriculture and enacting draconian labour legislation. Resources were mobilized for rapid industrialization, which significantly expanded Soviet capacity in heavy industry and capital goods during the 1930s. The primary motivation for industrialization was preparation for war, mostly due to distrust of the outside capitalist world. As a result, the USSR was transformed from a largely agrarian economy into a great industrial power, leading the way for its emergence as a superpower after World War II. The war caused extensive devastation of the Soviet economy and infrastructure, which required massive reconstruction.

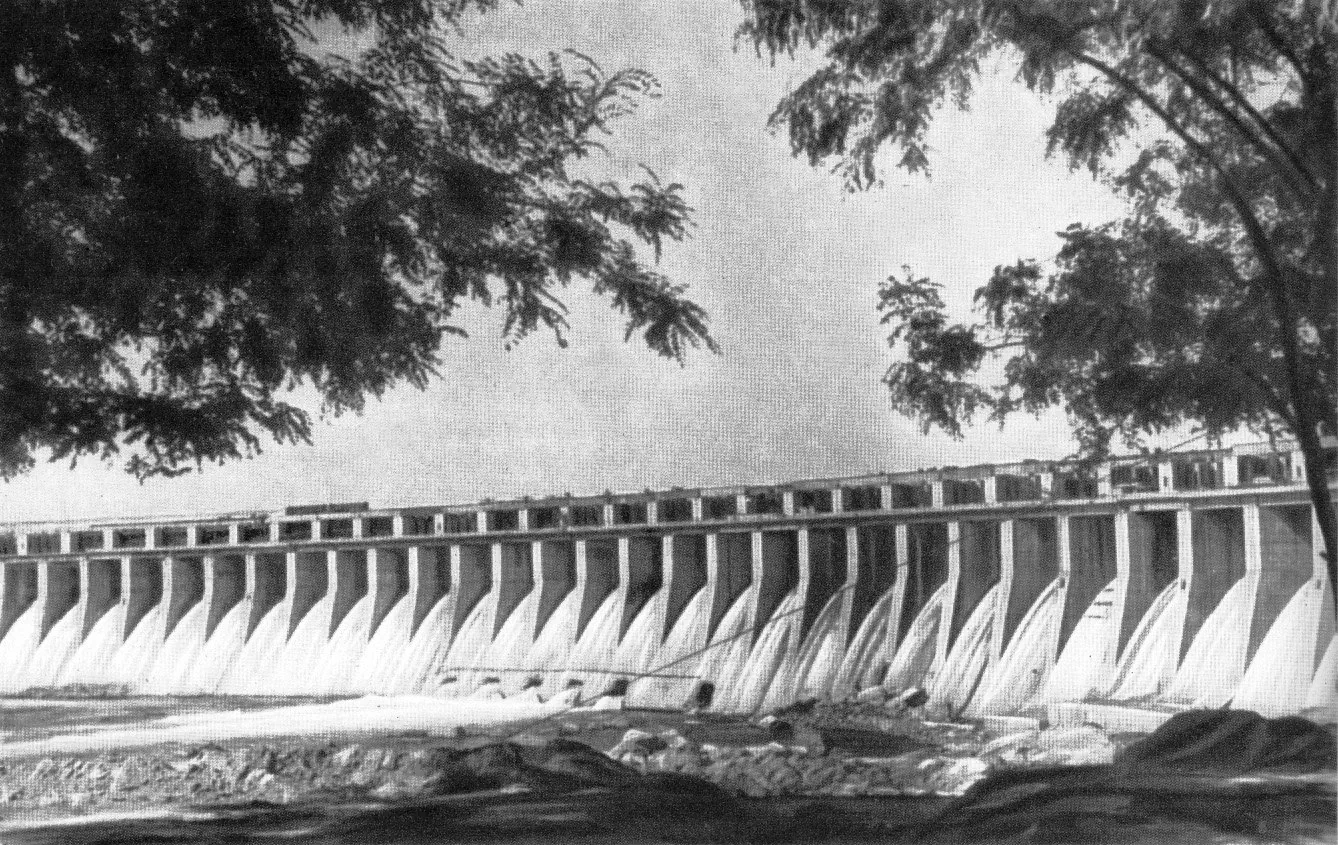
The DneproGES, one of many hydroelectric power stations in the Soviet Union and a symbol of Soviet economic progress

By the early 1940s, the Soviet economy had become relatively self-sufficient; for most of the period until the creation of Comecon, only a tiny share of domestic products was traded internationally. After the creation of the Eastern Bloc, external trade rose rapidly. However, the influence of the world economy on the USSR was limited by fixed domestic prices and a state monopoly on foreign trade. Grain and sophisticated consumer manufactures became major import articles from around the 1960s. During the arms race of the Cold War, the Soviet economy was burdened by military expenditures, heavily lobbied for by a powerful bureaucracy dependent on the arms industry. At the same time, the USSR became the largest arms exporter to the Third World. A portion of Soviet resources during the Cold War were allocated in aid to the Soviet-aligned states. The Soviet Union's military budget in the 1970s was gigantic, forming, according to some estimates, 40–60% of the entire federal budget and accounting to 15% of the USSR's GDP (13% in the 1980s).

From the 1930s until its dissolution in late 1991, the way the Soviet economy operated remained essentially unchanged. The economy was formally directed by central planning, carried out by Gosplan and organized in five-year plans. However, in practice, the plans were highly aggregated and provisional, subject to ad hoc intervention by superiors. All critical economic decisions were taken by the political leadership. Allocated resources and plan targets were usually denominated in rubles rather than in physical goods. Credit was discouraged, but widespread. The final allocation of output was achieved through relatively decentralized, unplanned contracting. Although in theory prices were legally set from above, in practice they were often negotiated, and informal horizontal links (e.g. between producer factories) were widespread.

A number of basic services were state-funded, such as education and health care. In the manufacturing sector, heavy industry and defence were prioritized over consumer goods. Consumer goods, particularly outside large cities, were often scarce, of poor quality and limited variety. Under the command economy, consumers had almost no influence on production, and the changing demands of a population with growing incomes could not be satisfied by supplies at rigidly fixed prices. A massive unplanned second economy grew up at low levels alongside the planned one, providing some of the goods and services that the planners could not. The legalization of some elements of the decentralized economy was attempted with the reform of 1965.

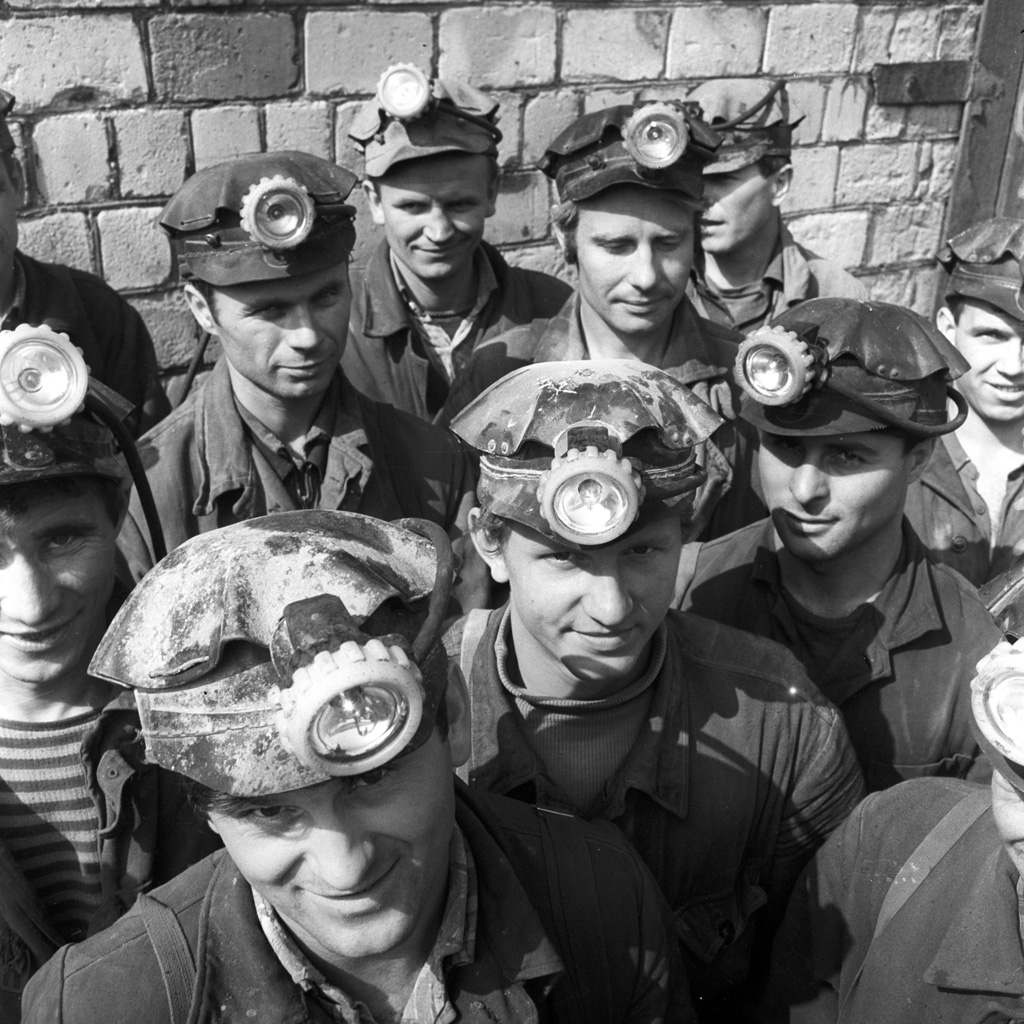
Workers at the Salihorsk potash plant, Belarus, 1968

Although statistics of the Soviet economy are notoriously unreliable and its economic growth difficult to estimate precisely, by most accounts, the economy continued to expand until the mid-1980s. During the 1950s and 1960s, it had comparatively high growth and was catching up to the West. However, after 1970, the growth, while still positive, steadily declined much more quickly and consistently than in other countries, despite a rapid increase in the capital stock (the rate of capital increase was surpassed only by Japan).

Professor of Economic History Bob Allen contends that in the era in which the Soviet economy was publicly owned and planned (1928–1989), the Soviet Union's GDP per capita growth outpaced nearly all other world economies, trailing only Japan, South Korea, and Taiwan. Data shows that Soviet per capita growth expanded by a factor of 5.2, exceeding the growth rates of Western Europe at 4.0, and the US, Canada, Australia, and New Zealand at 3.3. Ultimately, the Soviet model of public ownership proved more effective at raising average incomes during this period than the world's primary industrialized capitalist systems. Scholar Christopher Davidson argued that, during the 1980s, the Reagan administration attempted to weaponize the global energy market against the USSR. At the request of CIA Director William J. Casey, Saudi Arabia flooded the market with oil, dropping the price from $28 to $10 per barrel, and draining Soviet foreign currency reserves. This was later described by a former CIA chief of staff as a "body blow to the Soviets. It was the equivalent of stepping on their oxygen tube."

Overall, the growth rate of per capita income in the Soviet Union between 1960 and 1989 was slightly above the world average (based on 102 countries). According to Stanley Fischer and William Easterly, growth could have been faster. By their calculation, per capita income in 1989 should have been twice higher than it was, considering the amount of investment, education and population. The authors attribute this poor performance to the low productivity of capital. Steven Rosefielde states that the standard of living declined due to Stalin's despotism. While there was a brief improvement after his death, it lapsed into stagnation.

In 1987, Mikhail Gorbachev attempted to reform and revitalize the economy with his program of perestroika. His policies relaxed state control over enterprises but did not replace it by market incentives, resulting in a sharp decline in output. The economy, already suffering from reduced petroleum export revenues, started to collapse. Prices were still fixed, and the property was still largely state-owned until after the country's dissolution. For most of the period after World War II until its collapse, Soviet GDP (PPP) was the second-largest in the world, and third during the second half of the 1980s, although on a per-capita basis, it was behind that of First World countries. Compared to countries with similar per-capita GDP in 1928, the Soviet Union experienced significant growth.

In 1990, the country had a Human Development Index of 0.920, placing it in the 'high' category of human development. It was the third-highest in the Eastern Bloc, behind Czechoslovakia and East Germany, and the 25th in the world of 130 countries.

=== Energy ===
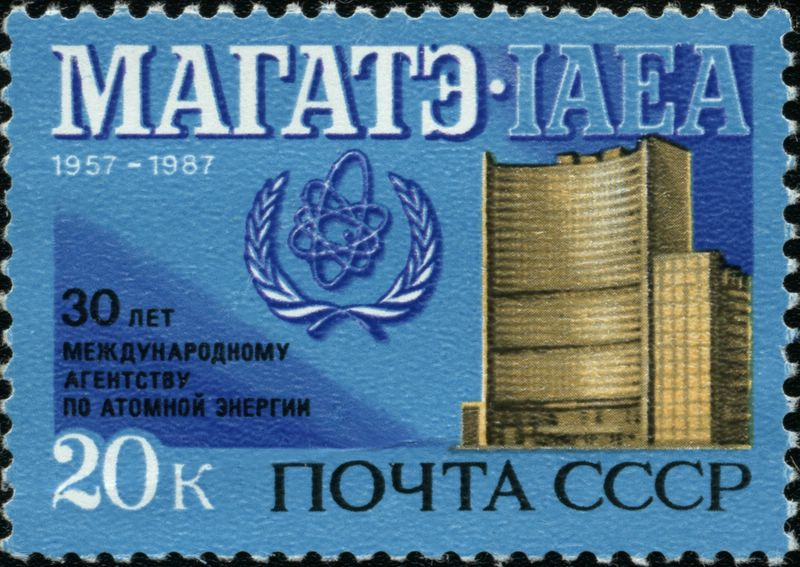
A Soviet stamp depicting the 30th anniversary of the International Atomic Energy Agency, published in 1987, a year following the Chernobyl disaster

The need for fuel declined in the Soviet Union from the 1970s to the 1980s, both per ruble of gross social product and per ruble of industrial product. The decline was very rapid between 1965 and 1970, then slowed between 1970 and 1975. From 1975 to 1980, the decline continued at an even slower rate, with fuel requirements per ruble of gross social product decreasing by only 2.6%. David Wilson, a historian, believed that the gas industry would account for 40% of Soviet fuel production by the end of the century. His theory did not come to fruition because of the USSR's collapse. According to Wilson, the Soviet Union was, in theory, well-positioned to avoid an energy crisis and could have sustained economic growth rates of 2–2.5% during the 1990s, supported by its energy resources. However, the energy sector faced many difficulties, among them the country's high military expenditure and hostile relations with the First World.

In 1991, the Soviet Union had a pipeline network of 82,000 kilometres (51,000 mi) for crude oil and another 206,500 kilometres (128,300 mi) for natural gas. Petroleum and petroleum-based products, natural gas, metals, wood, agricultural products, and a variety of manufactured goods, primarily machinery, arms and military equipment, were exported. In the 1970s and 1980s, the USSR heavily relied on fossil fuel exports to earn hard currency. At its peak in 1988, it was the largest producer and second-largest exporter of crude oil, surpassed only by Saudi Arabia.

=== Science and technology ===
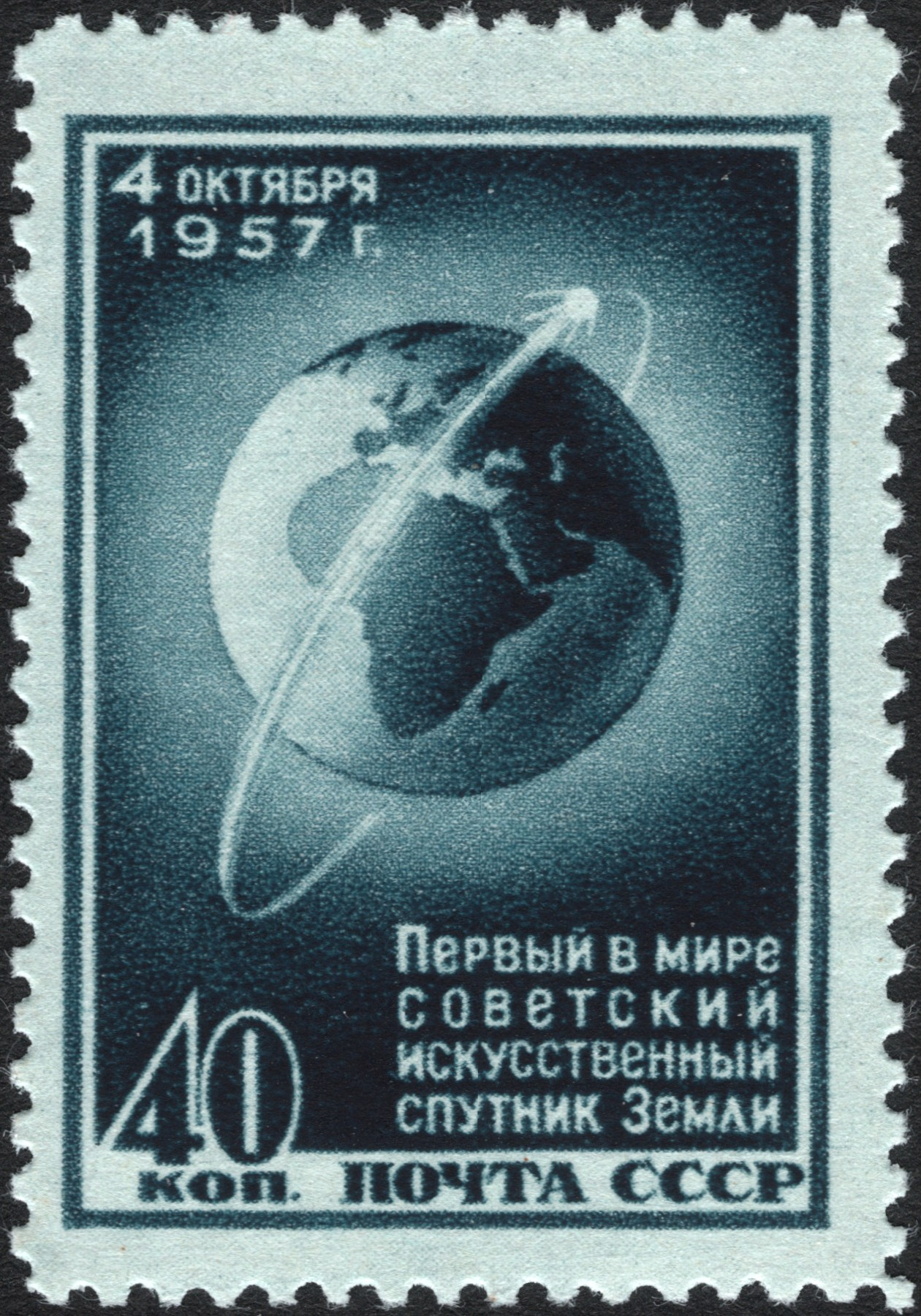
Soviet stamp showing the orbit of Sputnik 1

The Soviet Union placed great emphasis on science and technology. Lenin believed the USSR would never overtake the developed world if it remained as technologically backward as it was upon its founding. Soviet authorities proved their commitment to Lenin's belief by developing massive networks and research and development organizations. In the early 1960s, 40% of chemistry PhDs in the Soviet Union were attained by women, compared with only 5% in the United States. By 1989, Soviet scientists were among the world's best-trained specialists in several areas, such as energy physics, selected areas of medicine, mathematics, welding, space technology, and military technologies. However, due to rigid state planning and bureaucracy, the Soviets remained far behind the First World in chemistry, biology, and computer science. Under Stalin, the Soviet government persecuted geneticists in favour of Lysenkoism, a pseudoscience rejected by the scientific community in the Soviet Union and abroad but supported by Stalin's inner circles. Implemented in the USSR and China, it resulted in reduced crop yields and is widely believed to have contributed to the Great Chinese Famine. In the 1980s, the Soviet Union had more scientists and engineers relative to the world's population than any other major country, owing to strong levels of state support. Some of its most remarkable technological achievements, such as launching the world's first space satellite, were achieved through military research.

Under the Reagan administration, Project Socrates determined that the Soviet Union addressed the acquisition of science and technology in a manner radically different to the United States. The US prioritized indigenous research and development in both the public and private sectors. In contrast, the USSR placed greater emphasis on acquiring foreign technology, which it did through both covert and overt means. However, centralized state planning kept Soviet technological development greatly inflexible. This was exploited by the US to undermine the strength of the Soviet Union and thus foster its reform.

=== Space program ===
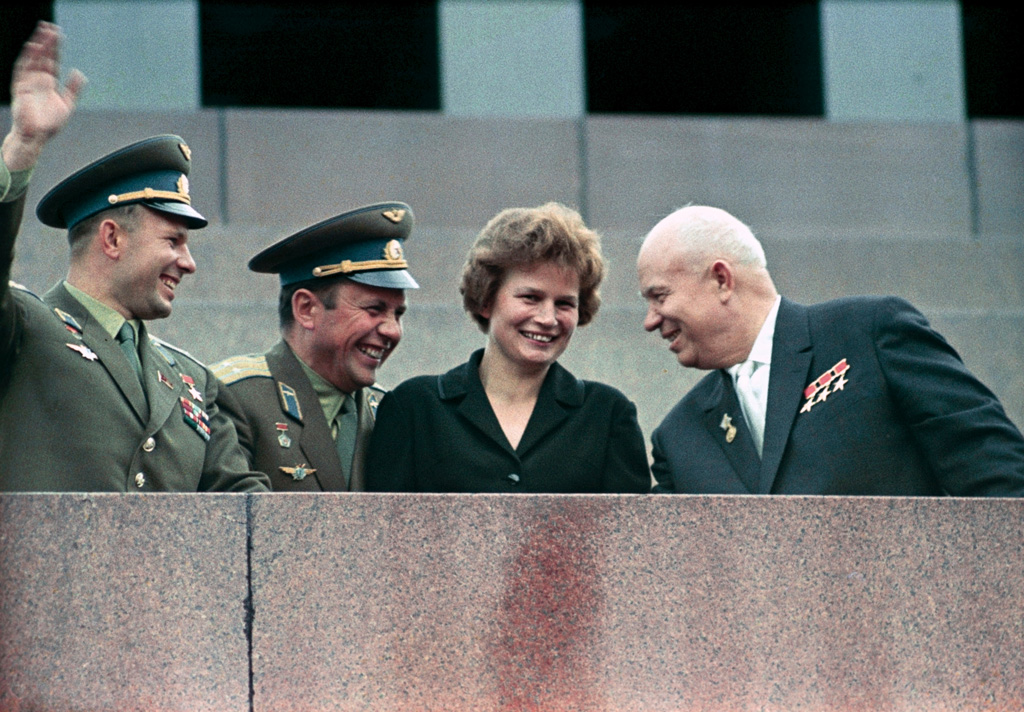
From left to right: Yuri Gagarin, Pavel Popovich, Valentina Tereshkova, and Nikita Khrushchev at Lenin's Mausoleum in 1963

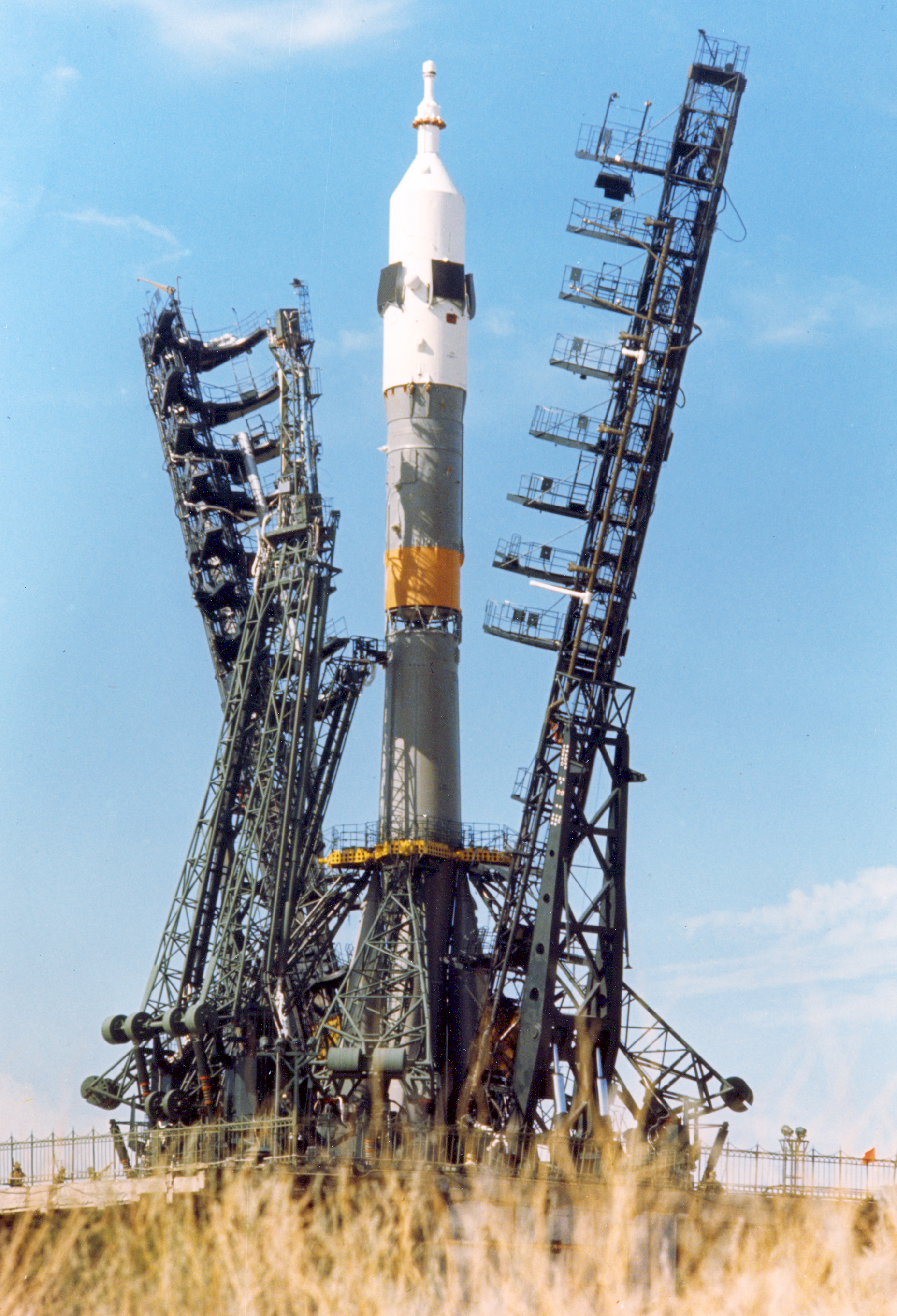
Soyuz rocket at the Baikonur Cosmodrome

At the end of the 1950s, the USSR constructed the first satellite—Sputnik 1, which marked the beginning of the Space Race—a competition to achieve superior spaceflight capability with the United States. This was followed by other successful satellites, most notably Sputnik 5, where test dogs were sent to space. On 12 April 1961, the USSR launched Vostok 1, which carried Yuri Gagarin, making him the first human to ever be launched into space and complete a space journey. The first plans for space shuttles and orbital stations were drawn up in Soviet design offices, but personal disputes between designers and management prevented their development.

In terms of the Luna program, the USSR had only automated spacecraft launches with no crewed spacecraft. The N1—a Super heavy-lift launch vehicle intended to match the American Saturn V for a Soviet crewed moon landing—failed all four of its test launches, and the 'Moon' part of Space Race was won by the Americans. The Soviet public's reaction to the American moon-landing was mixed. The Soviet government limited the release of information about it, which affected the reaction. A portion of the populace did not give it attention, and another portion was angered.

In the 1970s, specific proposals for the design of a space shuttle emerged, but shortcomings, especially in the electronics industry (rapid overheating of electronics), postponed it till the end of the 1980s. The first shuttle, the Buran, flew in 1988, but without a human crew. Another, Ptichka, endured prolonged construction and was canceled in 1991. For their launch into space, there is today an unused superpower rocket, Energia, which is the most powerful in the world.

In the late 1980s, the Soviet Union built the Mir orbital station. It was built on the construction of Salyut stations and its only role was civilian-grade research tasks. Mir was the only orbital station in operation from 1986 to 1998. Gradually, other modules were added to it, including American modules. However, the station deteriorated rapidly after a fire on board and was deorbited in 2001, burning up in the Earth's atmosphere.

=== Transport ===
Aeroflot's flag during the Soviet era

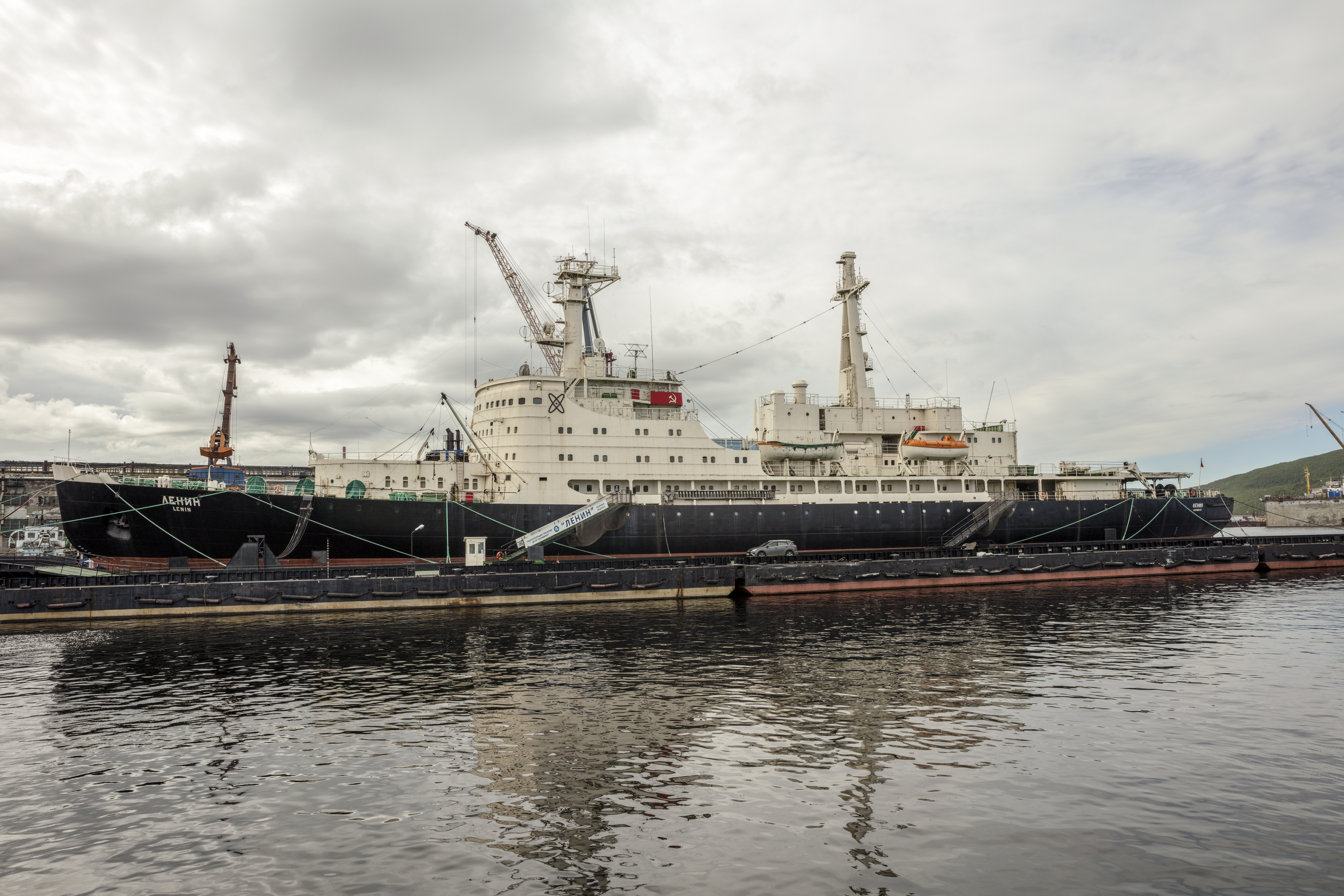
Nuclear icebreaker Lenin

Transport was a vital component of the country's economy. The economic centralization of the late 1920s and 1930s led to the development of infrastructure on a massive scale, most notably the establishment of Aeroflot, an aviation enterprise. The country had a wide variety of modes of transport by land, water and air. However, due to inadequate maintenance, much of the road, water and Soviet civil aviation transport were outdated and technologically backward compared to the First World.

Soviet rail transport was the largest and most intensively used in the world; it was also better developed than most of its Western counterparts. By the late 1970s and early 1980s, Soviet economists were calling for the construction of more roads to alleviate some of the burdens from the railways and to improve the Soviet government budget. The street network and automotive industry remained underdeveloped, and dirt roads were common outside major cities. Soviet maintenance projects proved unable to take care of even the few roads the country had. By the early-to-mid-1980s, the Soviet authorities tried to solve the road problem by ordering the construction of new ones. Meanwhile, the automobile industry was growing at a faster rate than road construction. The underdeveloped road network led to a growing demand for public transport.

Despite improvements, several aspects of the transport sector were still riddled with problems due to outdated infrastructure, lack of investment, corruption and bad decision-making. Soviet authorities were unable to meet the growing demand for transport infrastructure and services.

The Soviet merchant navy was one of the largest in the world.

== Demographics ==
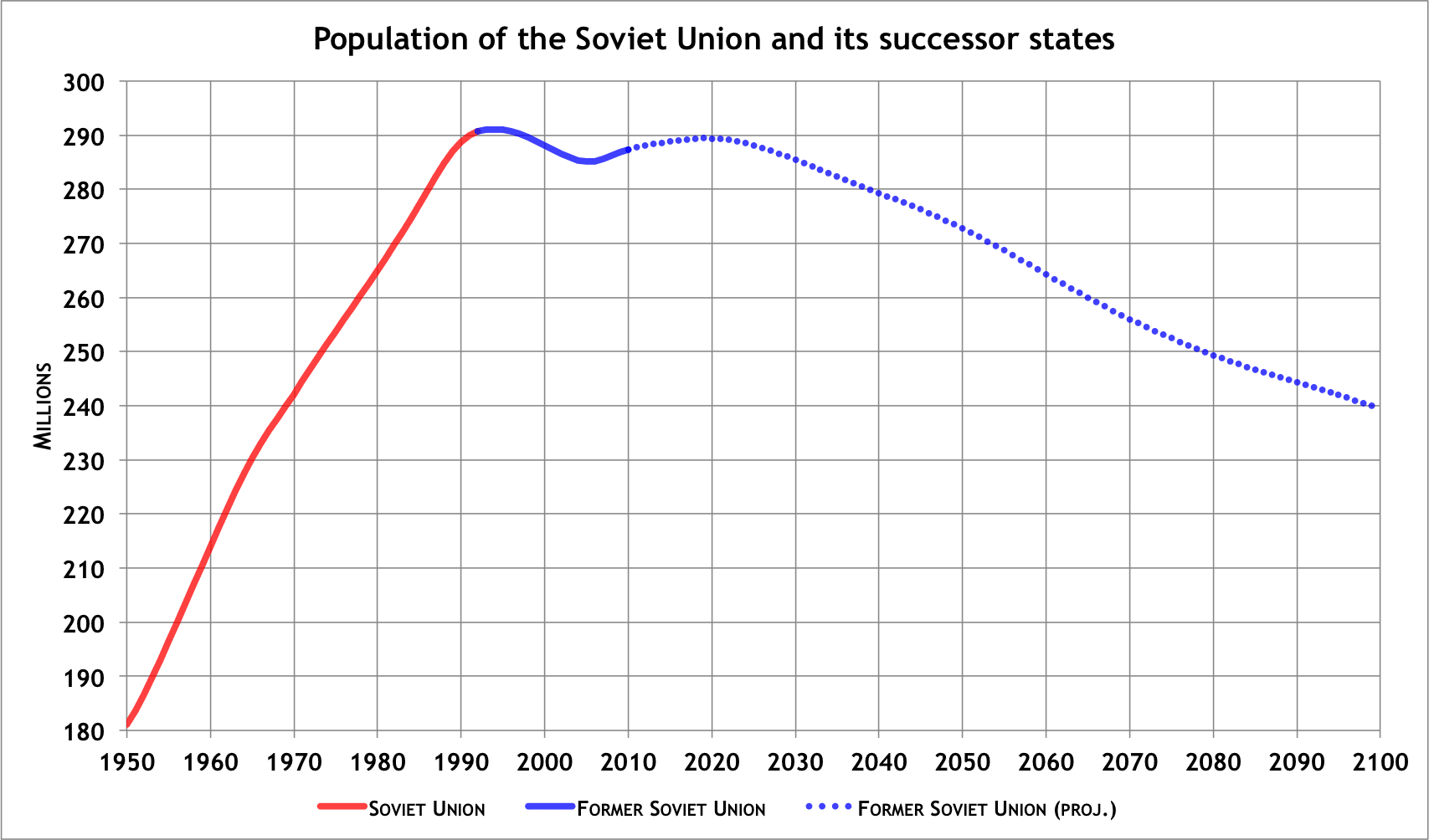
Population of the Soviet Union (red) and the post-Soviet states (blue) from 1961 to 2009 as well as projection (dotted blue) from 2010 to 2100

Excess deaths throughout World War I and the Russian Civil War (including the famine of 1921–1922 that was triggered by Lenin's war communism policies) amounted to a combined total of 18 million, some 10 million in the 1930s, and more than 20 million in 1941–1945. The postwar Soviet population was 45 to 50 million smaller than it would have been if pre-war demographic growth had continued. According to Catherine Merridale, "[...] a reasonable estimate would place the total number of excess deaths for the whole period somewhere around 60 million."

The birth rate of the USSR decreased from 44.0 per thousand in 1926 to 18.0 in 1974, mainly due to increasing urbanization and the rising average age of marriages. The mortality rate demonstrated a gradual decrease as well—from 23.7 per thousand in 1926 to 8.7 in 1974. In general, the birth rates of the southern republics in Transcaucasia and Central Asia were considerably higher than those in the northern parts of the Soviet Union, and in some cases even increased in the post–World War II period, a phenomenon partly attributed to slower rates of urbanization and traditionally earlier marriages in the southern republics. Soviet Europe moved towards sub-replacement fertility, while Soviet Central Asia continued to exhibit population growth well above replacement-level fertility.

The late 1960s and the 1970s witnessed a reversal of the declining trajectory of the rate of mortality in the USSR, and was especially notable among men of working age, but was also prevalent in Russia and other predominantly Slavic areas of the country. An analysis of the official data from the late 1980s showed that after worsening in the late 1970s and the early 1980s, adult mortality began to improve again. The infant mortality rate increased from 24.7 in 1970 to 27.9 in 1974. Some researchers regarded the rise as mostly real, a consequence of worsening health conditions and services. The rises in both adult and infant mortality were not explained or defended by Soviet officials, and the Soviet government stopped publishing all mortality statistics for ten years. Soviet demographers and health specialists remained silent about the mortality increases until the late 1980s, when the publication of mortality data resumed, and researchers could delve into the real causes.

Largest cities or towns in the Soviet Union Sources: 1989 Soviet census
Rank	Name	Republic	Pop.	Rank	Name	Republic	Pop.
1	Moscow	Russian SFSR	8,967,332	11	Tbilisi	Georgian SSR	1,246,936
2	Leningrad	Russian SFSR	4,990,749	12	Kuybyshev	Russian SFSR	1,254,460
3	Kiev	Ukrainian SSR	2,571,000	13	Yerevan	Armenian SSR	1,201,539
4	Tashkent	Uzbek SSR	2,072,459	14	Dnepropetrovsk	Ukrainian SSR	1,178,000
5	Baku	Azerbaijan SSR	1,727,000	15	Omsk	Russian SFSR	1,148,418
6	Kharkov	Ukrainian SSR	1,593,970	16	Chelyabinsk	Russian SFSR	1,141,777
7	Minsk	Byelorussian SSR	1,607,077	17	Odessa	Ukrainian SSR	1,115,371
8	Gorki	Russian SFSR	1,438,133	18	Donetsk	Ukrainian SSR	1,109,900
9	Novosibirsk	Russian SFSR	1,436,516	19	Kazan	Russian SFSR	1,094,378
10	Sverdlovsk	Russian SFSR	1,364,621	20	Alma-Ata	Kazakh SSR	1,071,900

=== Urbanism ===
Largest cities of the USSR according to the 1989 census

The Soviet Union imposed heavy controls on city growth, preventing some cities from reaching their full potential while promoting others.

For the entirety of the Soviet Union's existence, the most populous cities were Moscow and Leningrad (both in Russian SFSR), with the third far place taken by Kiev (Ukrainian SSR). At the USSR's inception, the fourth and fifth most populous cities were Kharkov (Ukrainian SSR) and Baku (Azerbaijan SSR), but, by the end of the century, Tashkent (Uzbek SSR), which had assumed the position of capital of Soviet Central Asia, had risen to fourth place. Minsk (Byelorussian SSR) saw rapid growth during the 20th century, rising from the 32nd most populous in the union to the 7th.

=== Women and fertility ===
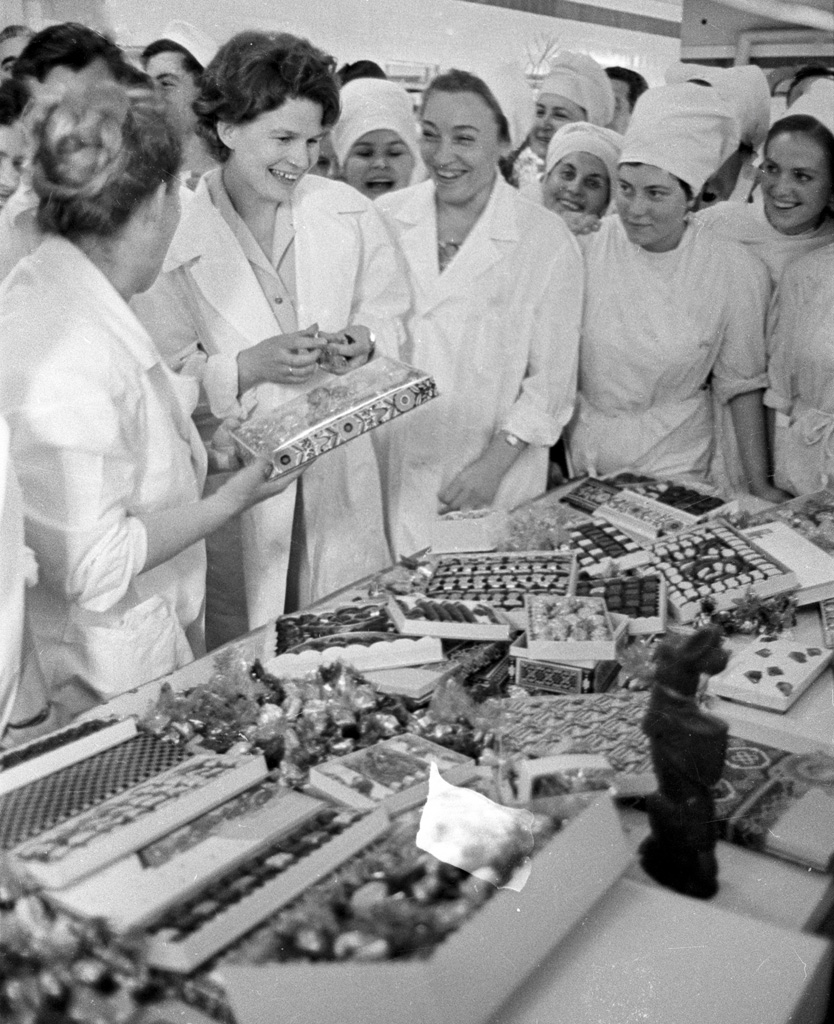
Valentina Tereshkova, the first woman in space, visiting the Lvov confectionery, Ukrainian SSR, 1967

Under Lenin, the state made explicit commitments to promote the equality of men and women. Many early Russian feminists and ordinary Russian working women actively participated in the Revolution, and many more were affected by the events of that period and the new policies. Beginning in October 1918, Lenin's government liberalized divorce and abortion laws, decriminalized homosexuality (re-criminalized in 1932), permitted cohabitation, and ushered in a host of reforms. However, without birth control, the new system produced many broken marriages, as well as countless out-of-wedlock children. The epidemic of divorces and extramarital affairs created social hardships when Soviet leaders wanted people to concentrate their efforts on growing the economy. Giving women control over their fertility also led to a precipitous decline in the birth rate, perceived as a threat to their country's military power. By 1936, Stalin reversed most of the liberal laws, ushering in a pronatalist era that lasted for decades.

By 1917, Russia became the first great power to grant women the right to vote. After heavy casualties in World Wars I and II, women outnumbered men in Russia by a 4:3 ratio; this contributed to the larger role women played in Russian society compared to other great powers at the time.

=== LGBTQ rights ===
The Soviet Union repressed homosexuality. Even during the period when homosexuality was officially legal after the abolition of the Tsarist penal code criminalizing it, Soviet courts attempted to repress non-traditional forms of sexuality, which were widely viewed by Russian revolutionaries as a form of capitalist decadence despite more liberal views on homosexuality from Soviet academic sexologists. After Stalin's consolidation of power, homosexuality became officially recriminalised in 1934. The increased homophobia during this time interval was driven by the economic demands of the First Five-Year Plan, as well as the NKVD's view of homosexuals as "socially harmful elements", although even during this heightened period of repression, a clandestine homosexual subculture was able to persist. Homosexuality remained a criminal offence throughout the remainder of the Soviet Union's existence.

=== Education ===
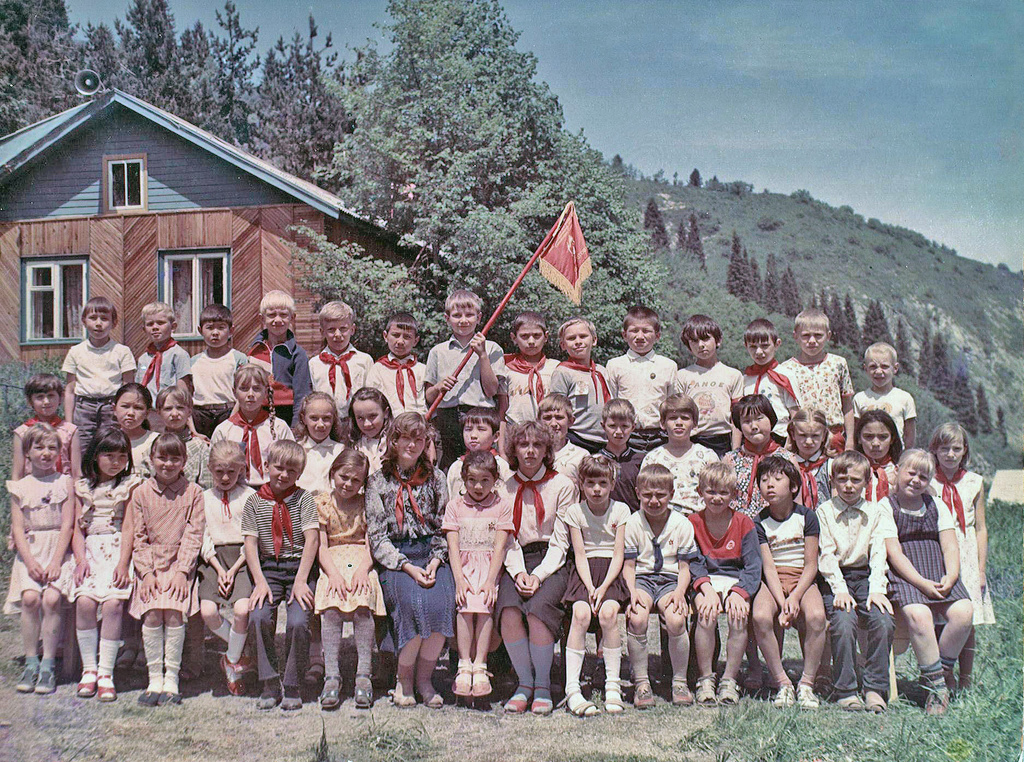
Young Pioneers at a Young Pioneer camp in the Kazakh SSR

Anatoly Lunacharsky became the first People's Commissar for Education of Soviet Russia. In the beginning, the Soviet authorities placed great emphasis on the elimination of illiteracy. All left-handed children were forced to write with their right hand in the Soviet school system. Literate people were automatically hired as teachers. For a short period, quality was sacrificed for quantity. By 1940, Stalin could announce that illiteracy had been eliminated. Throughout the 1930s, social mobility rose sharply, which has been attributed to reforms in education. In the aftermath of World War II, the country's educational system expanded dramatically, which had a tremendous effect. In the 1960s, nearly all children had access to education, the only exception being those living in remote areas. Nikita Khrushchev tried to make education more accessible, making it clear to children that education was closely linked to the needs of society. Education also became important in giving rise to the New Man. Citizens directly entering the workforce had the constitutional right to a job and to free vocational training.

The education system was highly centralized and universally accessible to all citizens, with affirmative action for applicants from nations associated with cultural backwardness. However, as part of a general antisemitic policy, an unofficial Jewish quota was applied in the leading institutions of higher education by subjecting Jewish applicants to harsher entrance examinations. The Brezhnev era also introduced a rule that required all university applicants to present a reference from the local Komsomol party secretary. According to statistics from 1986, the number of higher education students per the population of 10,000 was 181 for the USSR, compared to 517 for the US.

=== Nationalities and ethnic groups ===
The Soviet Union was an ethnically diverse country, with more than 100 distinct ethnic groups. The total population of the country was estimated at 293 million in 1991. According to a 1990 estimate, the majority of the population were Russians (50.78%), followed by Ukrainians (15.45%) and Uzbeks (5.84%). Overall, in 1989 the ethnic demography of the country showed that 69.8% was East Slavic, 17.5% was Turkic, 1.6% were Armenians, 1.6% were Balts, 1.5% were Uralic, 1.5% were Tajik, 1.4% were Georgian, 1.2% were Moldovan, and 4.1% were of other various ethnic groups.

All citizens of the USSR had their own ethnic affiliation. The ethnicity of a person was chosen at the age of sixteen by the child's parents. If the parents did not agree, the child was automatically assigned the ethnicity of the father. Partly due to Soviet policies, some of the smaller minority ethnic groups were considered part of larger ones, such as the Mingrelians of Georgia, who were classified with the linguistically related Georgians. Some ethnic groups voluntarily assimilated, while others were brought in by force. Those who refused to assimilate would be mistreated and ostracized. Some ethnic groups suffered more than others, however some groups would be afforded better treatment than others. A person's quality of life was heavily influenced by their ethnicity. When the Bolsheviks first took power, they wanted to make it seem as if the ethnicities were equal. However, in most cases, Russians were generally preferred over other ethnicities. Russians, Belarusians, and Ukrainians, who were all East Slavic and Orthodox, shared close cultural, ethnic, and religious ties, while other groups did not. With multiple nationalities living in the same territory, ethnic antagonisms developed over the years.

Members of various ethnicities participated in legislative bodies. Organs of power like the Politburo, the Secretariat of the Central Committee etc., were formally ethnically neutral, but in reality, ethnic Russians were overrepresented, although there were also non-Russian leaders in the Soviet leadership, such as Joseph Stalin, Grigory Zinoviev, Nikolai Podgorny, or Andrei Gromyko. During the Soviet era, a significant number of ethnic Russians and Ukrainians migrated to other Soviet republics, and many of them settled there. According to the last census in 1989, the Russian 'diaspora' in the Soviet republics had reached 25 million.

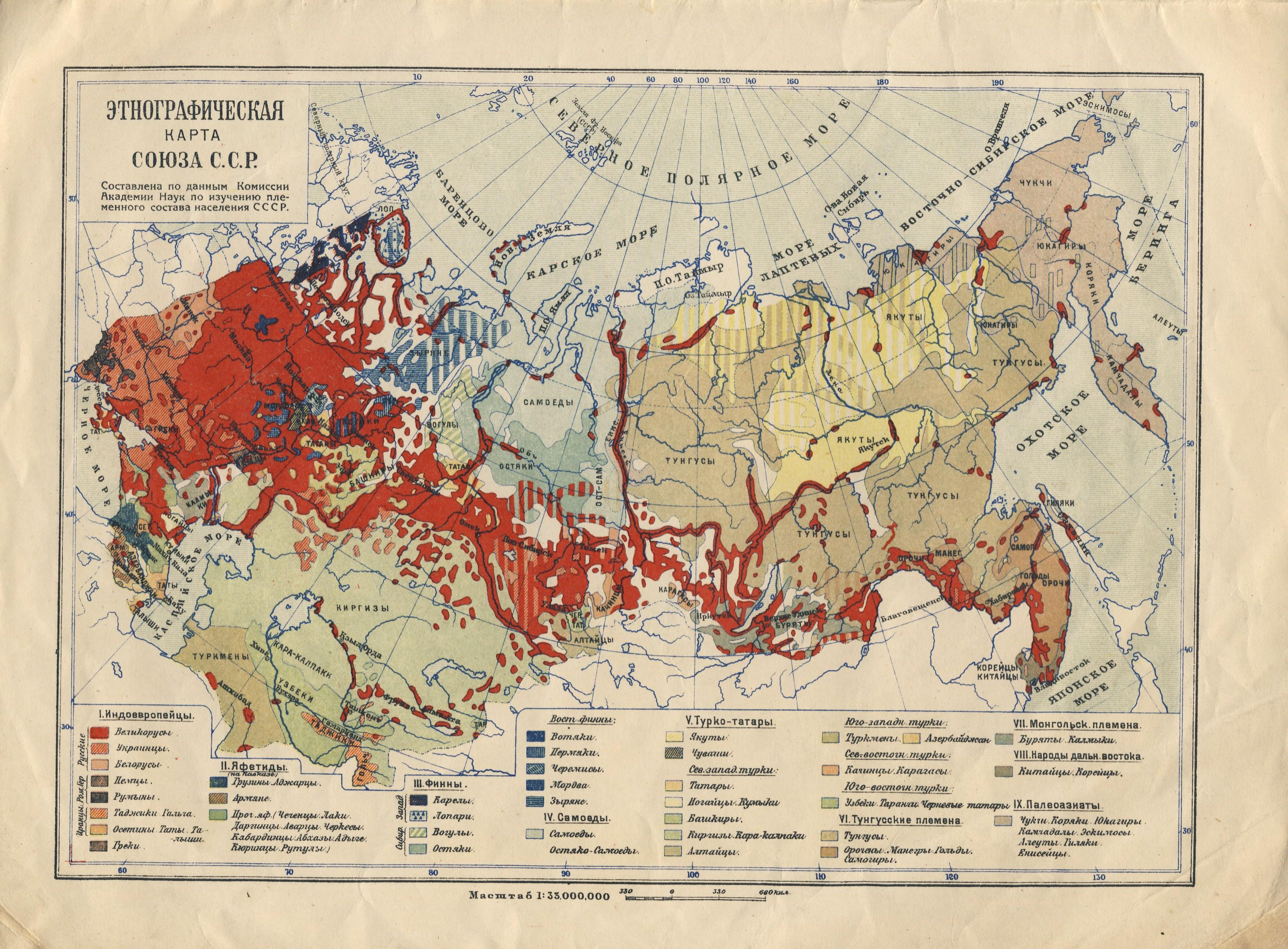
Ethnographic map of the USSR, 1930

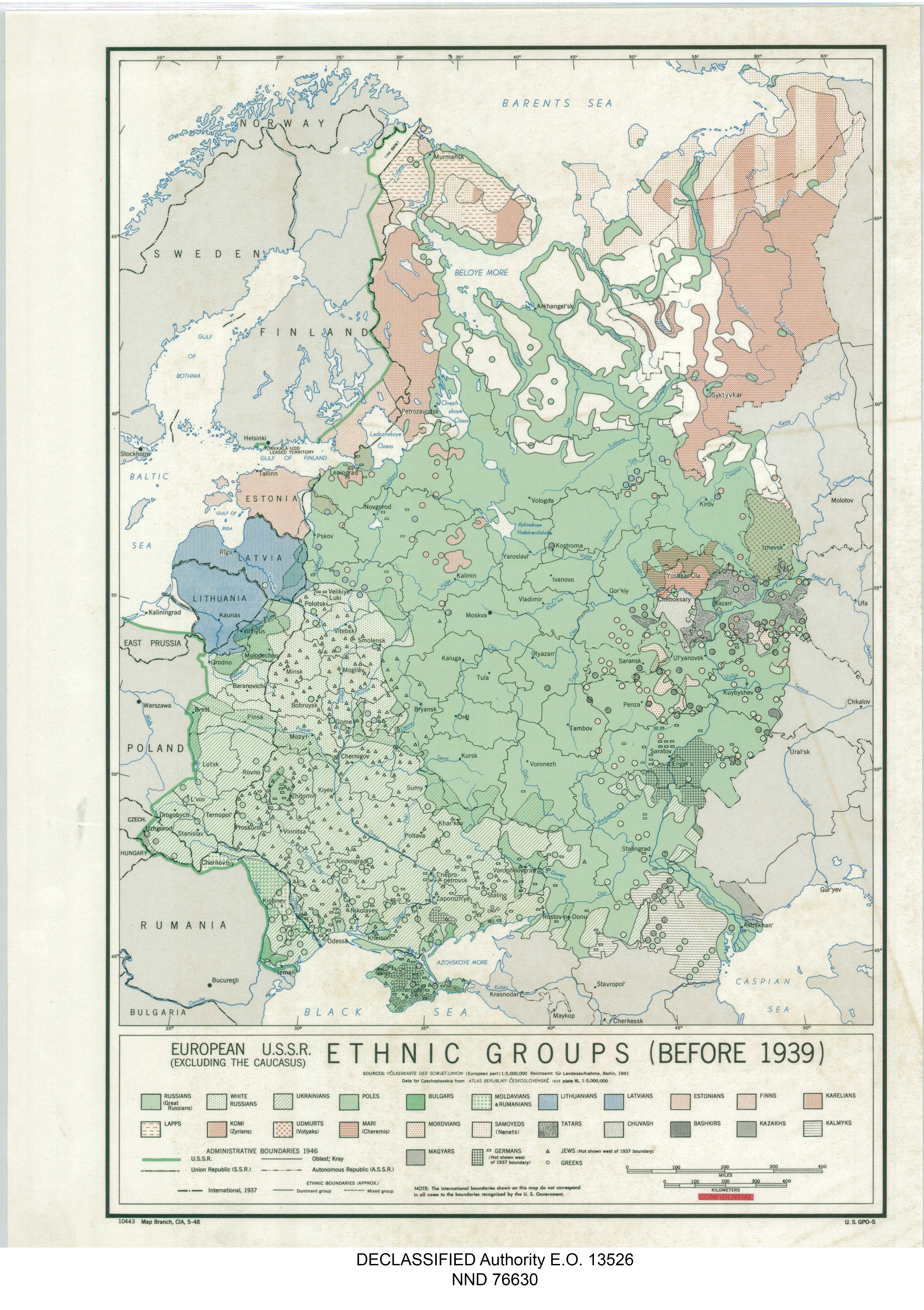
European Union of Soviet Socialist Republics (USSR) Ethnic Groups, before 1939

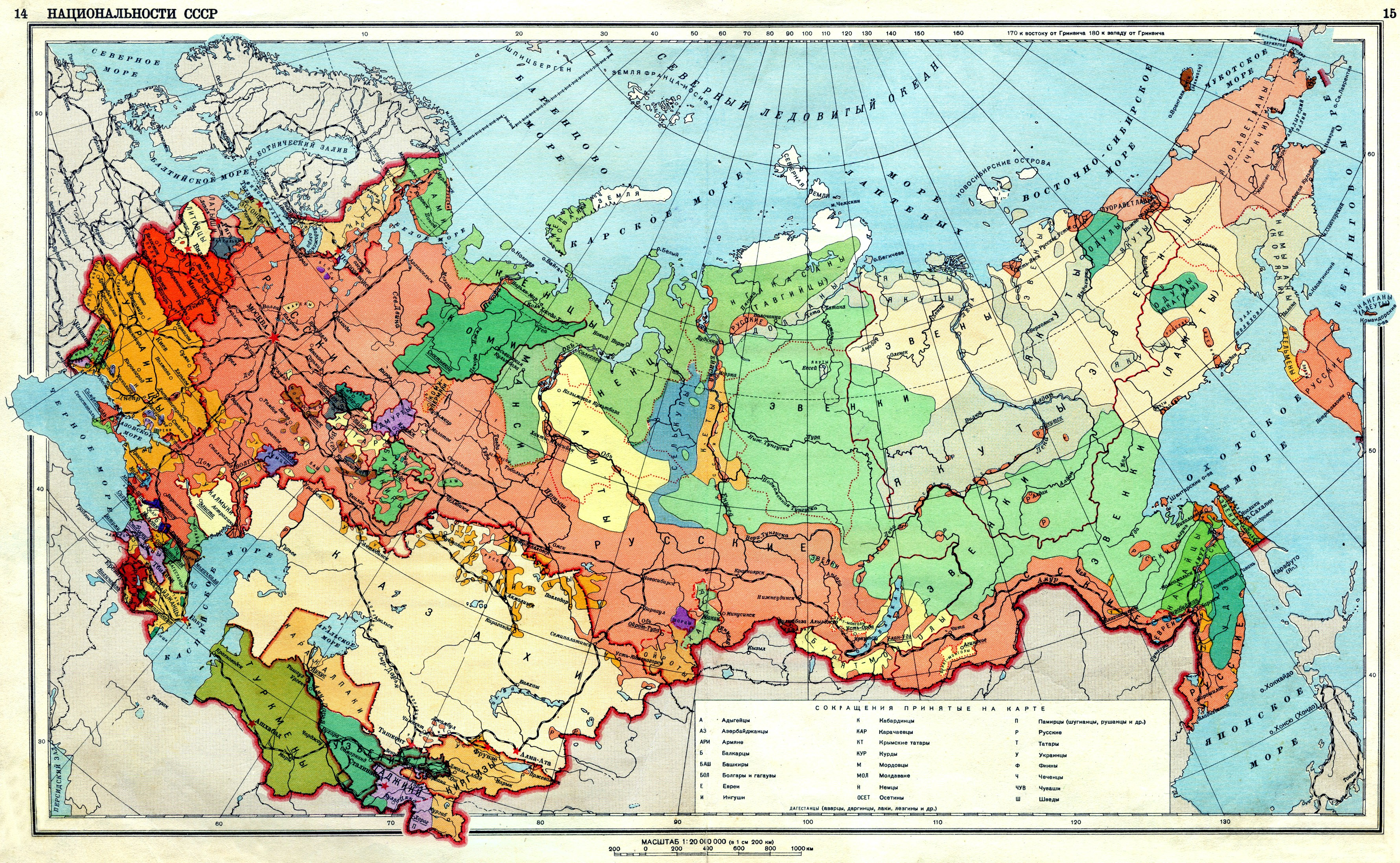
Ethnographic map of the Soviet Union, 1941

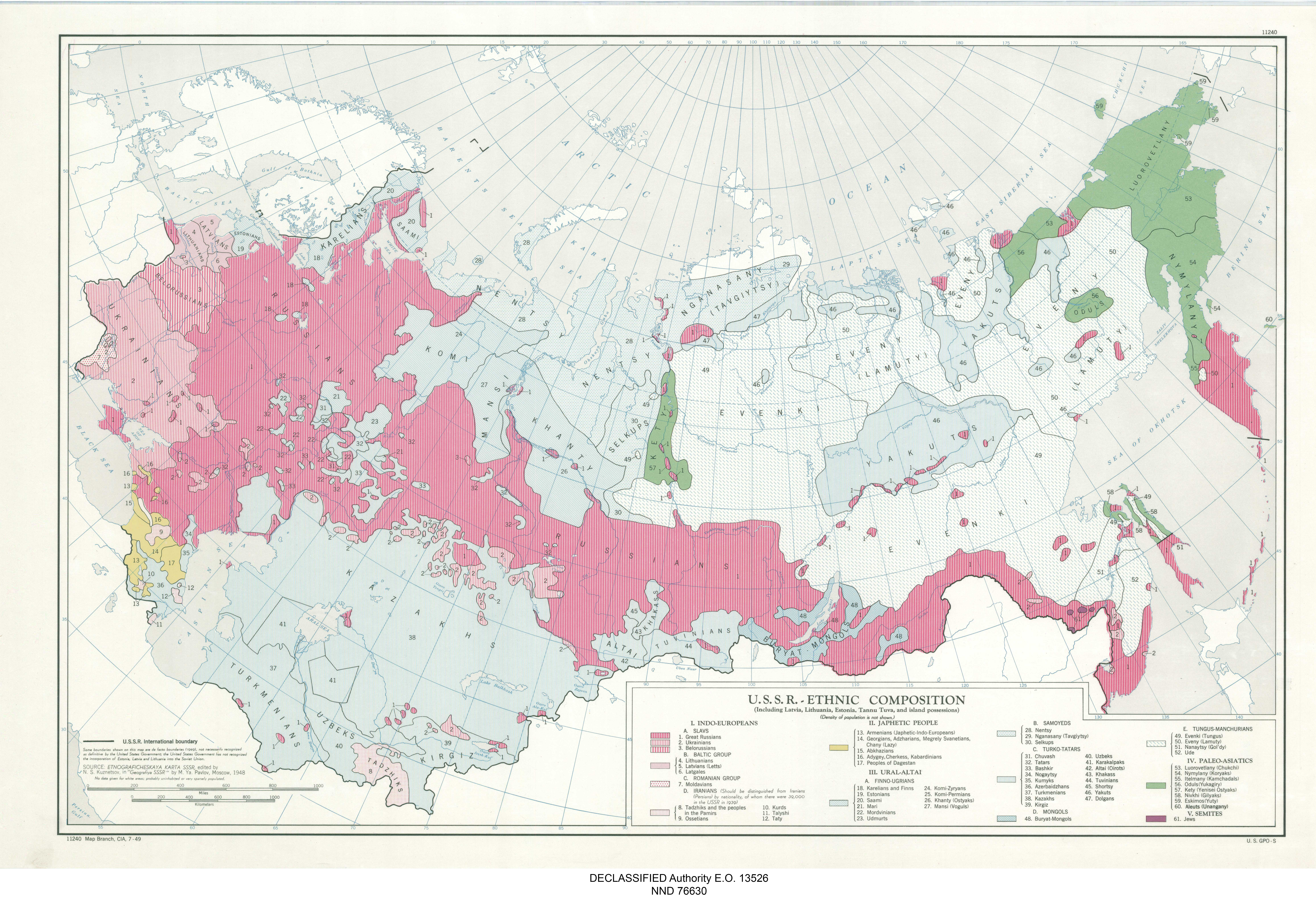
Ethnic composition of the Soviet Union in 1949

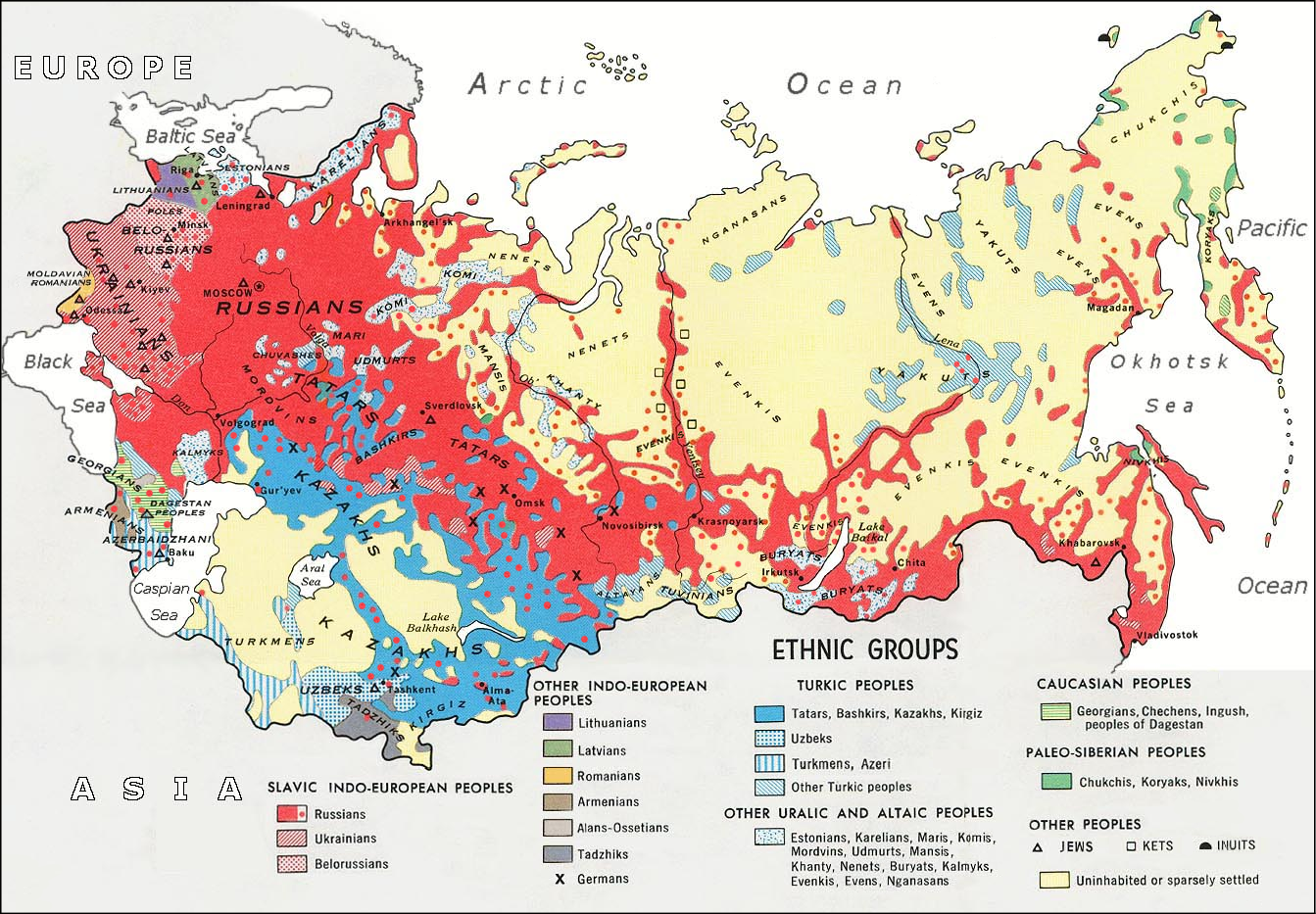
Ethnographic map of the Soviet Union, 1970

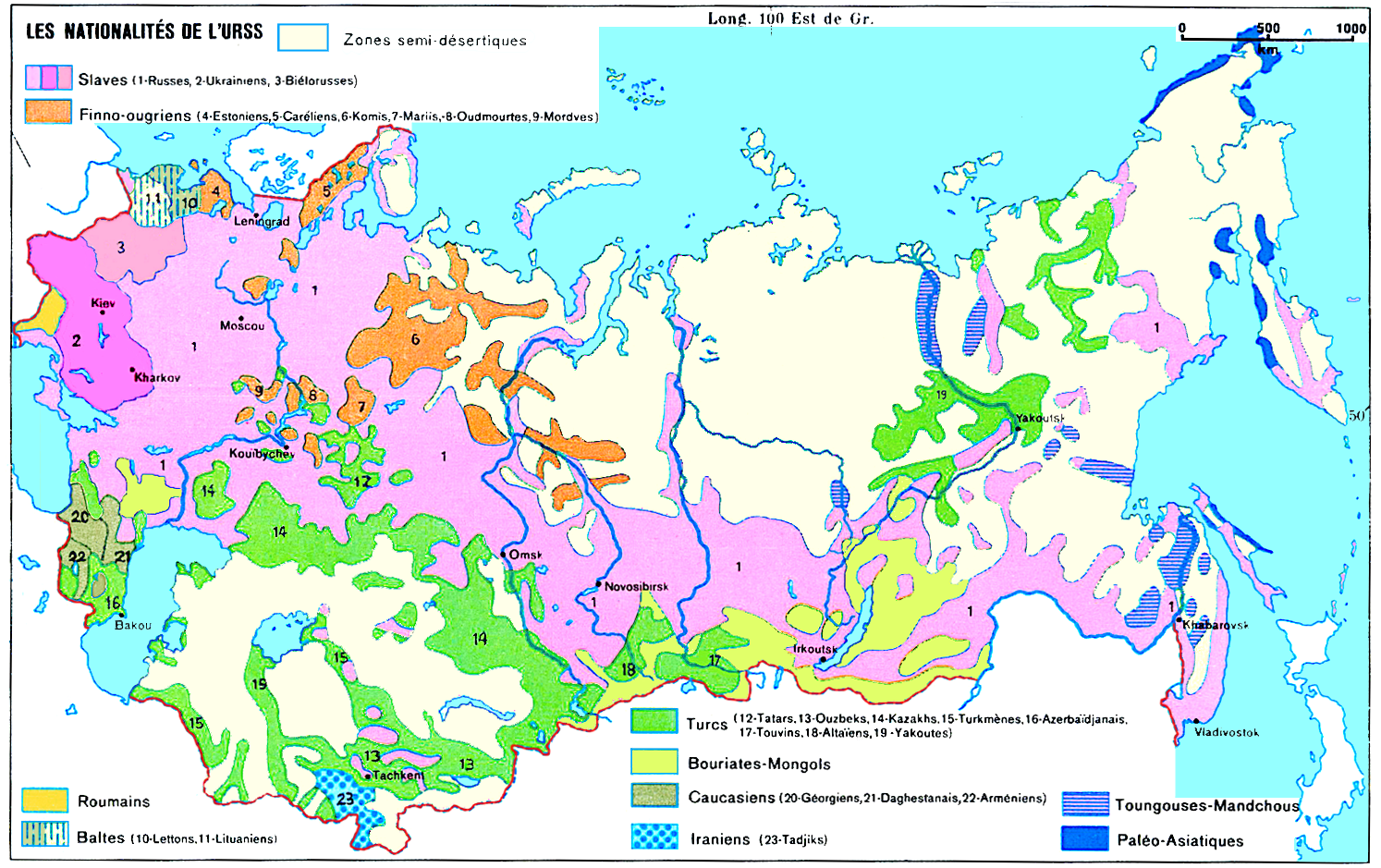
Map of the ethnic groups living in USSR, 1970

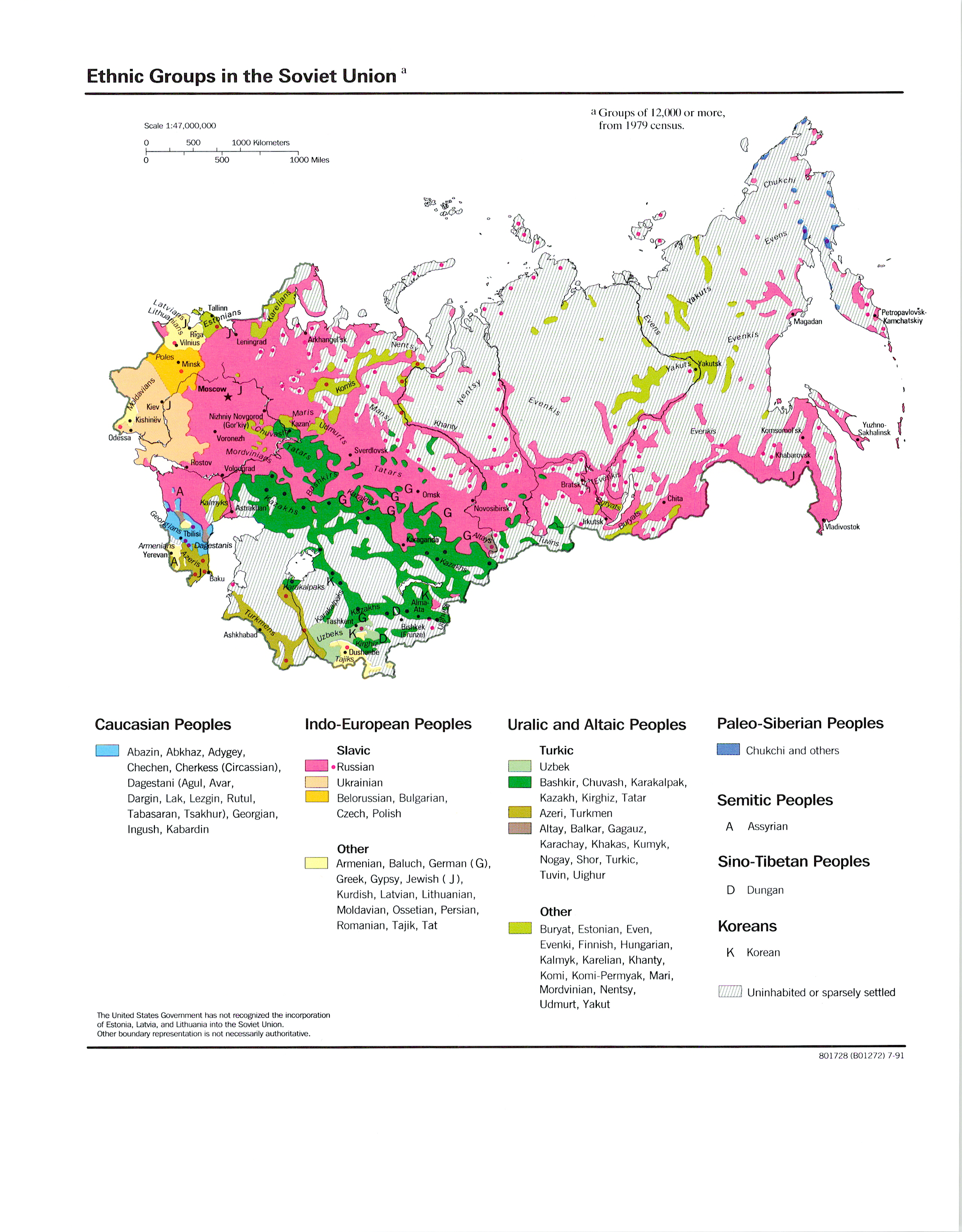
Ethnic Groups in the Soviet Union, 1979

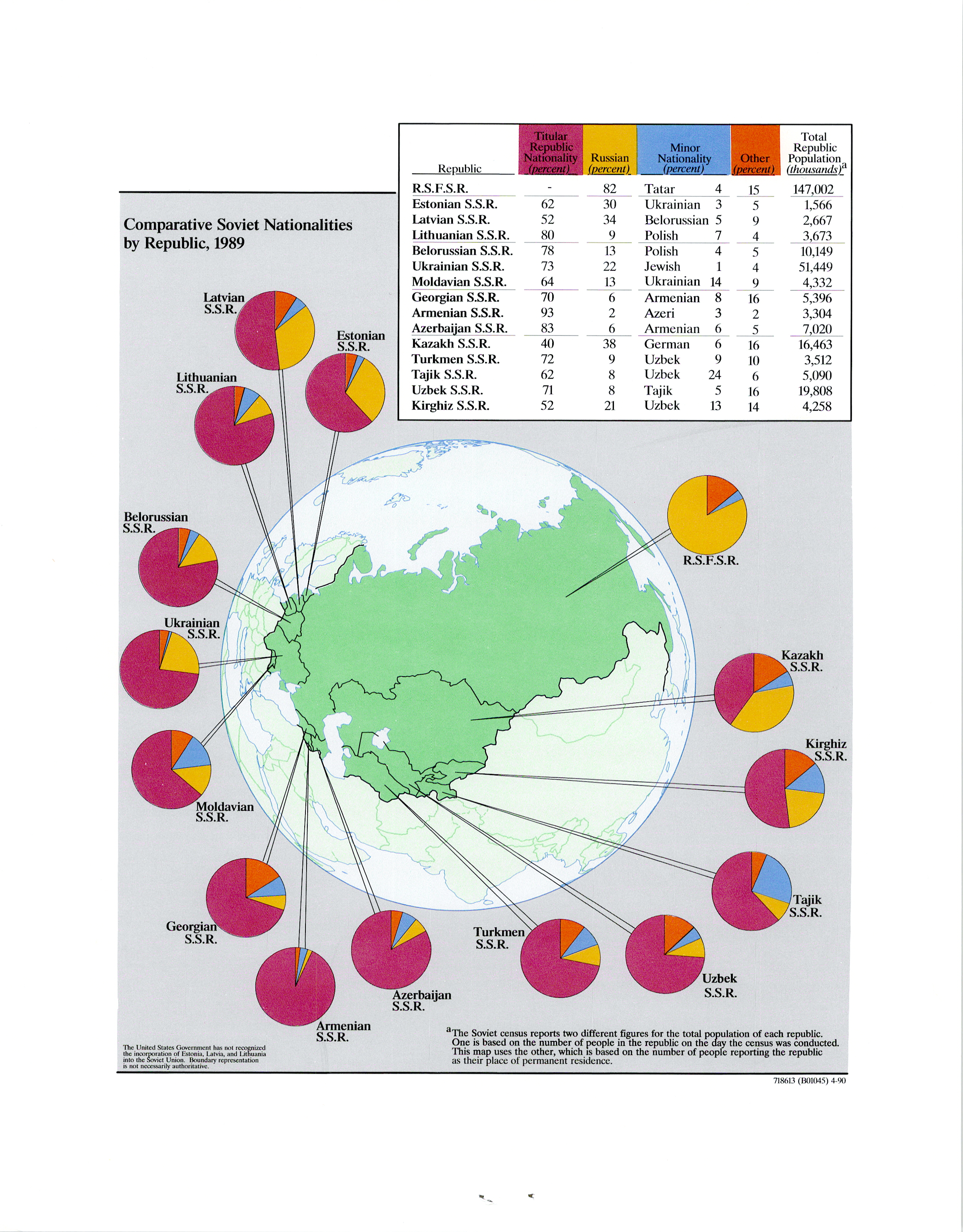
Comparative Soviet Nationalities by Republic, 1989

=== Health ===
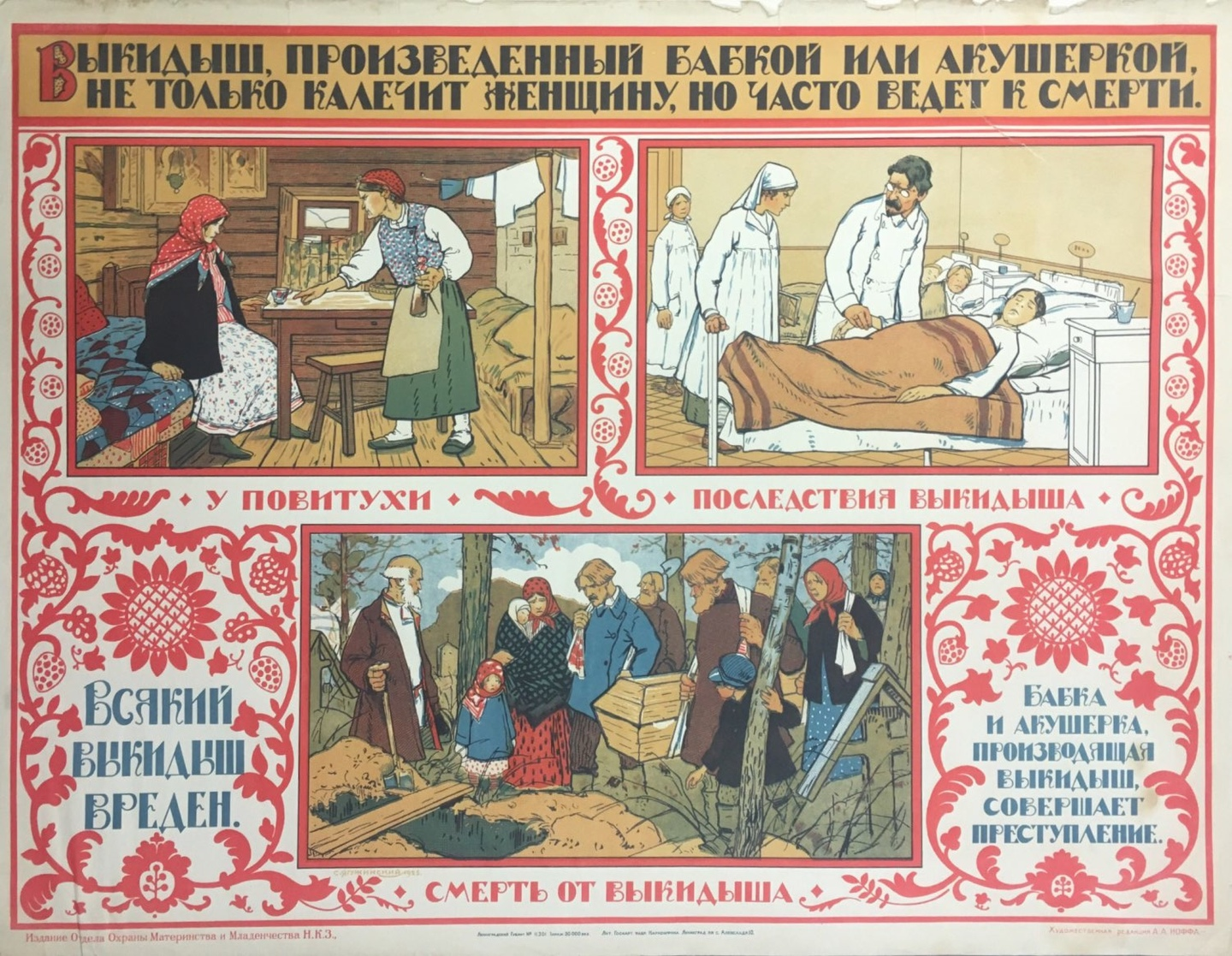
An early Soviet-era poster discouraging unsafe abortion practices

In 1917, before the revolution, health conditions were significantly behind those of developed countries. As Lenin later noted, "Either the lice will defeat socialism, or socialism will defeat the lice." The Soviet health care system was conceived by the People's Commissariat for Health in 1918. Under the Semashko model, health care was to be controlled by the state and would be provided to its citizens free of charge, a revolutionary concept at the time. Article 42 of the 1977 Soviet Constitution gave all citizens the right to health protection and free access to any health institutions in the USSR. Before Leonid Brezhnev became general secretary, the Soviet healthcare system was held in high esteem by many foreign specialists. This changed, however, from Brezhnev's accession and Mikhail Gorbachev's tenure as leader, during which the health care system was heavily criticized for many basic faults, such as the quality of service and the unevenness in its provision. Minister of Health Yevgeniy Chazov, during the 19th Congress of the Communist Party of the Soviet Union, while highlighting such successes as having the most doctors and hospitals in the world, recognized the system's areas for improvement and felt that billions of rubles were squandered.

After the revolution, life expectancy for all age groups went up. These improvements continued into the 1960s when statistics indicated that the life expectancy briefly surpassed that of the United States; life expectancy started to decline in the 1970s, possibly because of alcohol abuse. At the same time, infant mortality began to rise. After 1974, the government stopped publishing statistics on the matter. This trend can be partly explained by the number of pregnancies rising drastically in the Asian part of the country where infant mortality was the highest while declining markedly in the more developed European part of the Soviet Union.

==== Dentistry ====
Soviet dental technology and dental health were considered extremely bad; in 1991, the average 35-year-old had 12 to 14 cavities, fillings or missing teeth. Toothpaste was often not available, and toothbrushes did not conform to standards of modern dentistry.

=== Language ===
Under Lenin, the government gave small language groups their own writing systems. The development of these writing systems was highly successful, even though some flaws were detected. During the later days of the USSR, countries with the same multilingual situation implemented similar policies. A serious problem when creating these writing systems was that the languages differed dialectally greatly from each other. When a language had been given a writing system and appeared in a notable publication, it would attain 'official language' status. There were many minority languages which never received their own writing system; therefore, their speakers were forced to have a second language. There are examples where the government retreated from this policy, most notably under Stalin where education was discontinued in languages that were not widespread. In 1938, Stalin mandated all schools to teach Soviet schoolchildren the Russian language. It did not stop children from getting an education in their native language (the language they grew up speaking), but they would also be required to learn how to speak the Russian language. Stalin saw this as necessary from a military perspective, because it would be easier for everyone to communicate. Despite only being mandated in 1938, children of different ethnicities were already being enrolled in schools teaching Russian beforehand because knowing the Russian language would open up a lot of opportunities for a person. Whether it expanded the person's ability to socialize or gave the person a chance to contribute to the multiethnic goals of the Soviet Union, many people saw the benefit of learning Russian. While other languages were spoken, Russian became the lingua franca of the USSR. During World War II, some minority languages were banned, and their speakers accused of collaborating with the enemy.

As the most widely spoken of the Soviet Union's many languages, Russian de facto functioned as an official language, as "the language of interethnic communication" (Russian: язык межнационального общения), but only assumed the de jure status as the official national language in 1990.

=== Religion ===
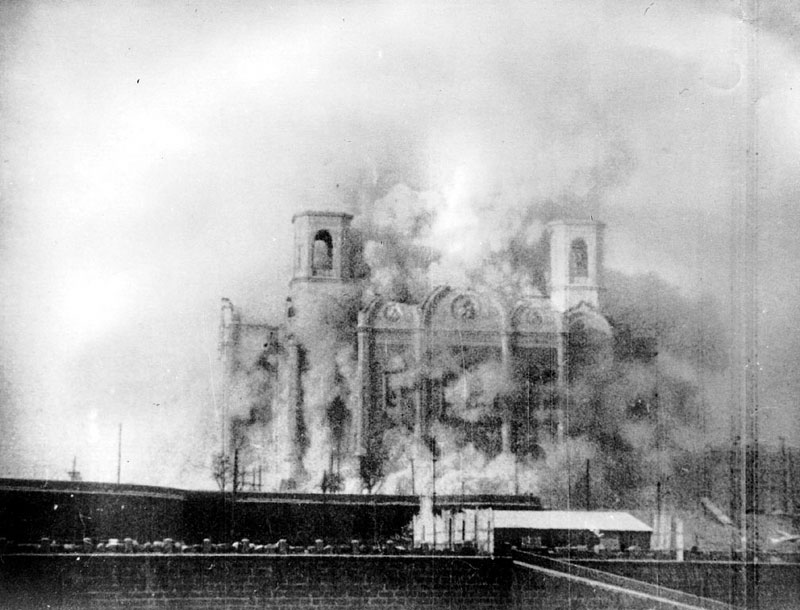
The Cathedral of Christ the Saviour in Moscow during its demolition in 1931

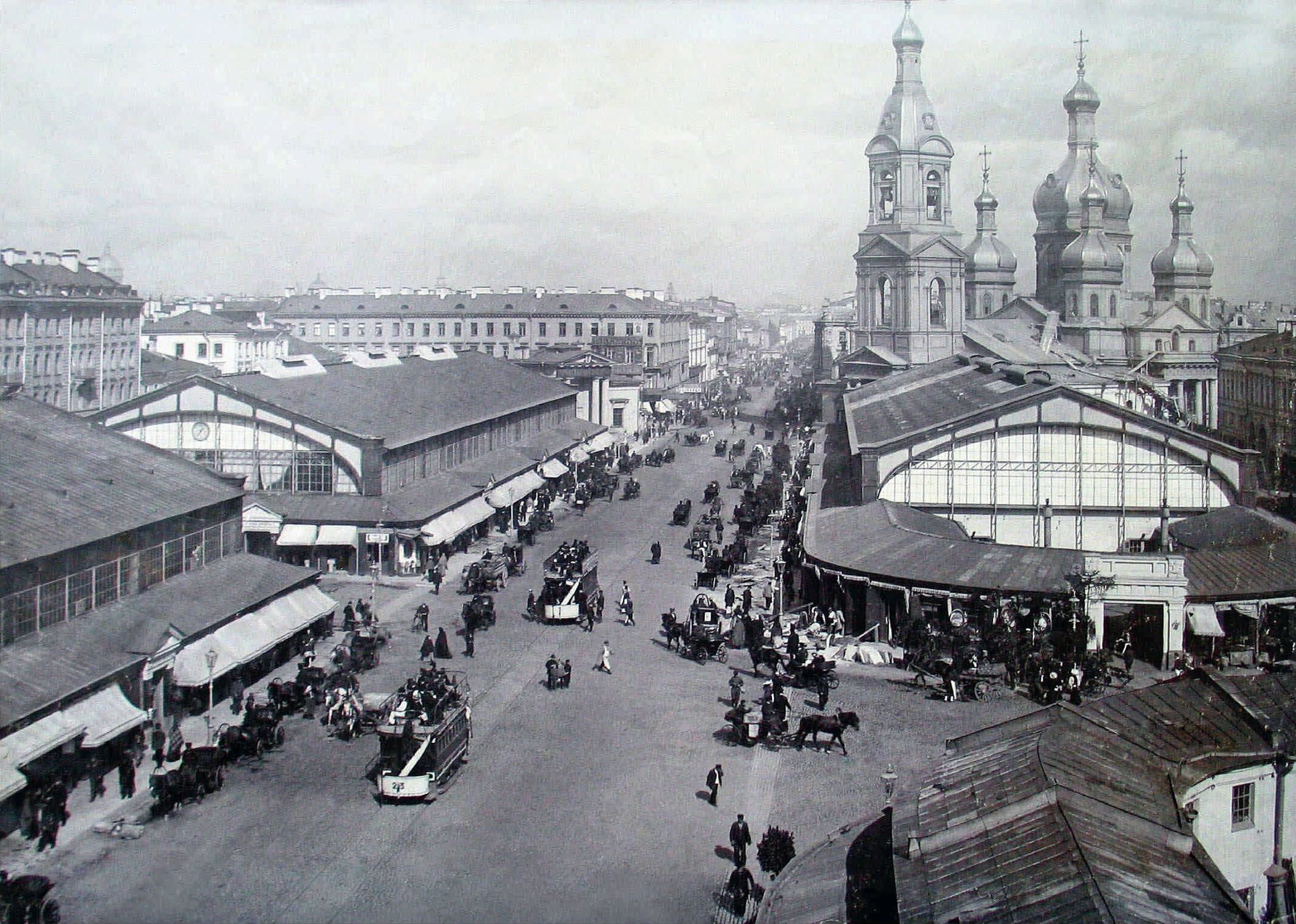
The Saviour Church on Sennaya Square in Leningrad was one of many notable church buildings destroyed during the Khrushchev Thaw.

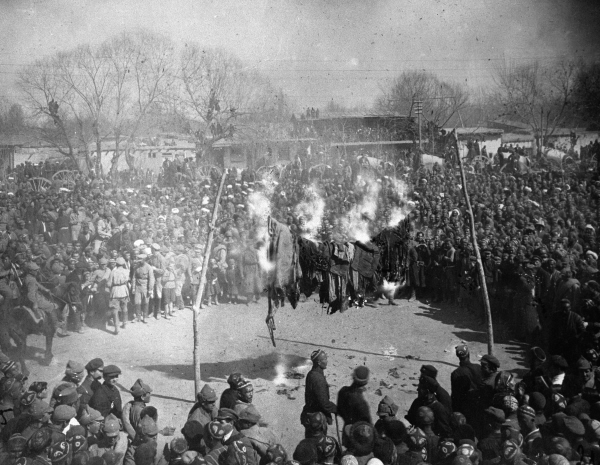
A paranja burning ceremony in the Uzbek SSR as part of Soviet Hujum policies

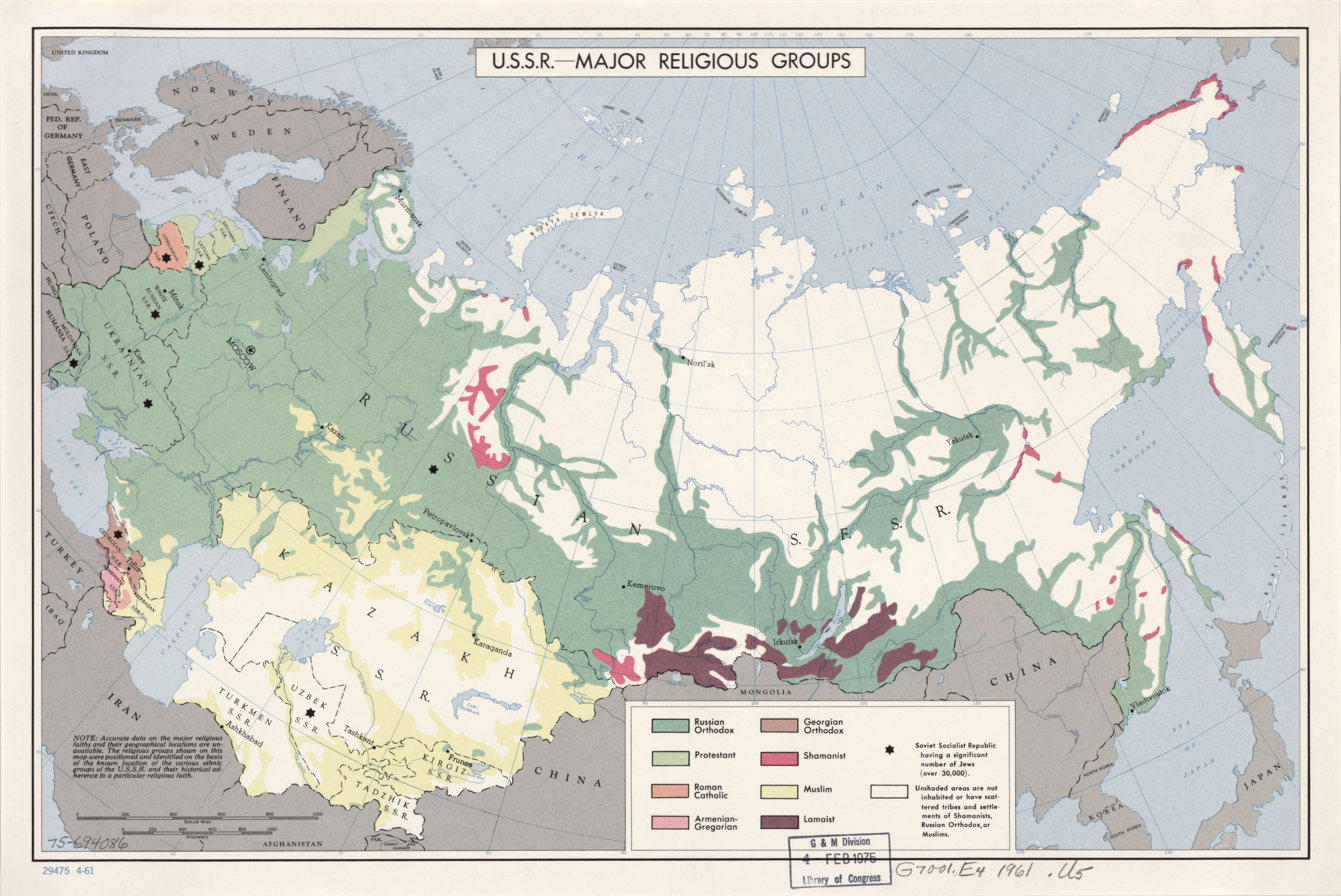
Major religious groups in the Soviet Union as published by the CIA

Christianity and Islam had the highest number of adherents among the religious citizens. Eastern Christianity predominated among Christians, with Russia's traditional Russian Orthodox Church being the largest Christian denomination. About 90% of the Soviet Union's Muslims were Sunnis, with Shias being concentrated in the Azerbaijan SSR. Smaller groups included Roman Catholics, Jews, Buddhists, and a variety of Protestant denominations (especially Baptists and Lutherans).

Religious influence had been strong in the Russian Empire. The Russian Orthodox Church enjoyed a privileged status as the church of the monarchy and took part in carrying out official state functions. The immediate period following the establishment of the Soviet state included a struggle against the Orthodox Church, which the revolutionaries considered an ally of the former ruling classes.

In Soviet law, the 'freedom to hold religious services' was constitutionally guaranteed, although the ruling Communist Party regarded religion as incompatible with the Marxist spirit of scientific materialism. In practice, the Soviet system subscribed to a narrow interpretation of this right, and in fact used a range of official measures to discourage religion and curb the activities of religious groups.

The 1918 Council of People's Commissars decree establishing the Russian SFSR as a secular state also decreed that "... the teaching of religion in all [places] where subjects of general instruction are taught, is forbidden. Citizens may teach and may be taught religion privately." Among further restrictions, those adopted in 1929 included express prohibitions on a range of church activities, including meetings for organized Bible study. Both Christian and non-Christian establishments were shut down by the thousands in the 1920s and 1930s. By 1940, as many as 90% of the churches, synagogues, and mosques that had been operating in 1917 were closed; the majority of them were demolished or re-purposed for state needs with little concern for their historic and cultural value.

More than 85,000 Orthodox priests were shot in 1937 alone. Only a twelfth of the Russian Orthodox Church's priests were left functioning in their parishes by 1941. In the period between 1927 and 1940, the number of Orthodox Churches in Russia fell from 29,584 to less than 500 (1.7%).

The Soviet Union was officially a secular state, but a 'government-sponsored program of forced conversion to atheism' was conducted under the doctrine of state atheism. The government targeted religions based on state interests, and while most organized religions were never outlawed, religious property was confiscated, believers were harassed, and religion was ridiculed while atheism was propagated in schools. In 1925, the government founded the League of Militant Atheists to intensify the propaganda campaign. Accordingly, although personal expressions of religious faith were not explicitly banned, a strong sense of social stigma was imposed on them by the formal structures and mass media, and it was generally considered unacceptable for members of certain professions (teachers, state bureaucrats, soldiers) to be openly religious. While persecution accelerated following Stalin's rise to power, a revival of Orthodoxy was fostered by the government during World War II and the Soviet authorities sought to control the Russian Orthodox Church rather than liquidate it. During the first five years of Soviet power, the Bolsheviks executed 28 Russian Orthodox bishops and over 1,200 Russian Orthodox priests. Many others were imprisoned or exiled. Believers were harassed and persecuted. Most seminaries were closed, and the publication of most religious material was prohibited. By 1941, only 500 churches remained open out of about 54,000 in existence before World War I.

Convinced that religious anti-Sovietism had become a thing of the past, and with the looming threat of war, the Stalin administration began shifting to a more moderate religion policy in the late 1930s. Soviet religious establishments overwhelmingly rallied to support the war effort during World War II. Amid other accommodations to religious faith after the German invasion, churches were reopened. Radio Moscow began broadcasting a religious hour, and a historic meeting between Stalin and Orthodox Church leader Patriarch Sergius of Moscow was held in 1943. Stalin had the support of the majority of the religious people in the USSR even through the late 1980s. The general tendency of this period was an increase in religious activity among believers of all faiths.

Under Nikita Khrushchev, the state leadership clashed with the churches in 1958–1964, a period when atheism was emphasized in the educational curriculum, and numerous state publications promoted atheistic views. During this period, the number of churches fell from 20,000 to 10,000 from 1959 to 1965, and the number of synagogues dropped from 500 to 97. The number of working mosques also declined, falling from 1,500 to 500 within a decade.

Religious institutions remained monitored by the Soviet government, but churches, synagogues, temples, and mosques were all given more leeway in the Brezhnev era. Official relations between the Orthodox Church and the government again warmed to the point that the Brezhnev government twice honoured Orthodox Patriarch Alexy I with the Order of the Red Banner of Labour. A poll conducted by Soviet authorities in 1982 recorded 20% of the Soviet population as "active religious believers".

== Culture ==
The "Enthusiast's March", a 1930s song famous in the Soviet Union

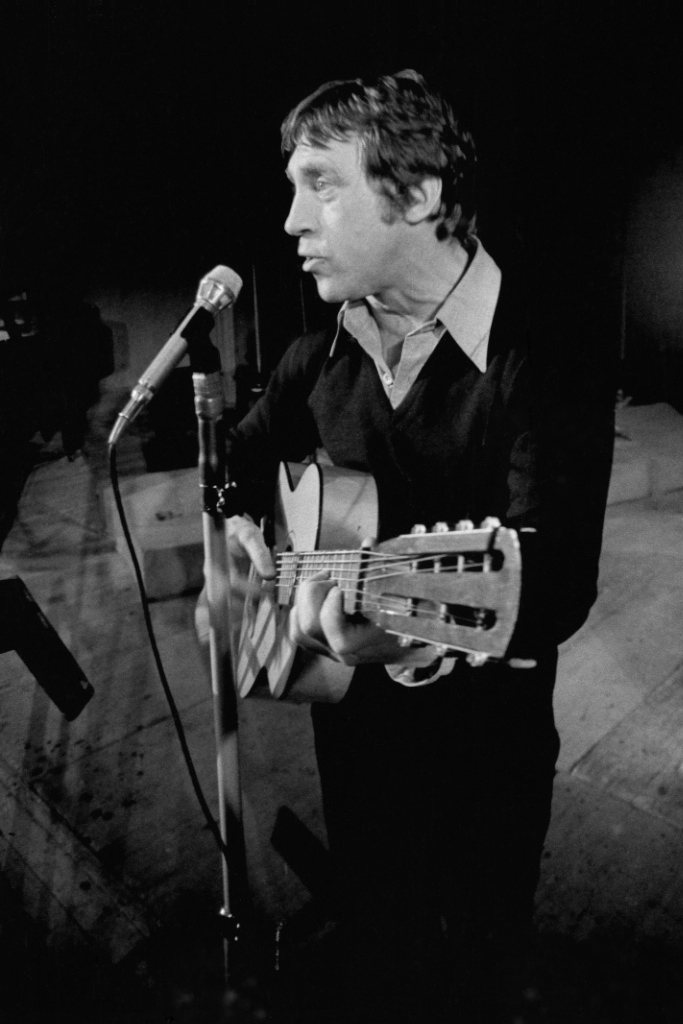
Soviet singer-songwriter, poet, and actor Vladimir Vysotsky in 1979

The culture of the Soviet Union evolved through several stages during its existence. During the first decade following the revolution, there was relative freedom and artists experimented with several different styles to find a distinctive Soviet style of art. Lenin wanted art to be accessible to the Russian people. On the other hand, hundreds of intellectuals, writers, and artists were exiled or executed, and their work banned, such as Nikolay Gumilyov who was shot for alleged conspiracy against the Bolsheviks, and Yevgeny Zamyatin.

The government encouraged a variety of trends. In art and literature, numerous schools, some traditional and others radically experimental, proliferated. Communist writers Maxim Gorky and Vladimir Mayakovsky were active during this time. As a means of influencing a largely illiterate society, films received encouragement from the state, and much of director Sergei Eisenstein's best work dates from this period.

During Stalin's rule, the Soviet culture was characterized by the rise and domination of the government-imposed style of socialist realism, with all other trends being severely repressed, with rare exceptions, such as Mikhail Bulgakov's works. Many writers were imprisoned and killed.

Following the Khrushchev Thaw, censorship was diminished. During this time, a distinctive period of Soviet culture developed, characterized by conformist public life and an intense focus on personal life. Greater experimentation in art forms was again permissible, resulting in the production of more sophisticated and subtly critical work. The government loosened its emphasis on socialist realism; thus, for instance, many protagonists of the novels of author Yury Trifonov concerned themselves with problems of daily life rather than with building socialism. Underground dissident literature, known as samizdat, developed during this late period. In architecture, the Khrushchev era mostly focused on functional design as opposed to the highly decorated style of Stalin's epoch. In music, in response to the increasing popularity of forms of popular music like jazz in the West, many jazz orchestras were permitted throughout the USSR, notably the Melodiya Ensemble, named after the principle record label in the USSR.

In the second half of the 1980s, Gorbachev's policies of perestroika and glasnost significantly expanded freedom of expression throughout the country in the media and the press.

== Sport ==
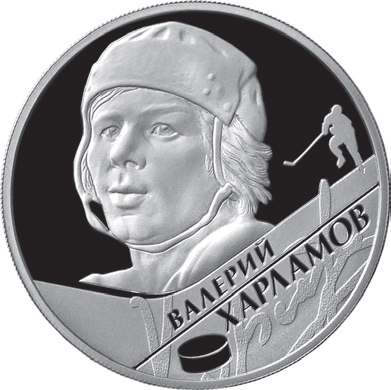
Valeri Kharlamov represented the Soviet Union at 11 Ice Hockey World Championships, winning eight gold medals, two silvers and one bronze.

The Soviet Olympic Committee formed on 21 April 1951, and the IOC recognized the new body in its 45th session. In the same year, when the Soviet representative Konstantin Andrianov became an IOC member, the USSR officially joined the Olympic Movement. The 1952 Summer Olympics in Helsinki thus became first Olympic Games for Soviet athletes. The Soviet Union was the biggest rival to the United States at the Summer Olympics, winning six of its nine appearances at the games and also topping the medal tally at the Winter Olympics six times. The Soviet Union's Olympics success has been attributed to its large investment in sports to demonstrate its superpower image and political influence on a global stage.

The Soviet Union national ice hockey team won nearly every world championship and Olympic tournament between 1954 and 1991 and never failed to medal in any International Ice Hockey Federation (IIHF) tournament in which they competed.

The Soviet Olympic team was notorious for skirting the edge of amateur rules. All Soviet athletes held some nominal jobs, but were in fact state-sponsored and trained full-time. According to many experts, that gave the Soviet Union a huge advantage over the United States and other Western countries, whose athletes were students or real amateurs. Indeed, the Soviet Union monopolized the top place in the medal standings after 1968, and, until its collapse, placed second only once, in the 1984 Winter games, after another Eastern bloc nation, the GDR. Amateur rules were relaxed only in the late 1980s and were almost completely abolished in the 1990s, after the fall of the USSR.

According to British journalist Andrew Jennings, a KGB colonel stated that the agency's officers had posed as anti-doping authorities from the International Olympic Committee (IOC) to undermine doping tests and that Soviet athletes were "rescued with [these] tremendous efforts". Documents obtained in 2016 revealed the Soviet Union's plans for a statewide doping system in track and field in preparation for the 1984 Summer Olympics in Los Angeles. Dated prior to the country's decision to boycott the Games, the document detailed the existing steroids operations of the program, along with suggestions for further enhancements.

In the late 1980s, the government was persuaded to fund construction of a racing yacht specifically to take part in the 1989–1990 Whitbread Round the World Race with a Soviet crew. The 25 metre sloop Fazisi was built in 1989 to the design of Vladislav Murnikov in Poti, Georgia. She came a creditable 11th in a field of 23 boats, but the project was not repeated.

== Legacy ==
The legacy of the USSR remains a controversial topic. The socio-economic nature of communist states such as the USSR, especially under Stalin, has also been much debated, varyingly being labelled a form of bureaucratic collectivism, state capitalism, state socialism, or a totally unique mode of production. The USSR implemented a broad range of policies over a long period of time, with a large amount of conflicting policies being implemented by different leaders. Some have a positive view of it whilst others are critical towards the country, calling it a repressive oligarchy. The opinions on the USSR are complex and have changed over time, with different generations having different views on the matter as well as on Soviet policies corresponding to separate time periods during its history.

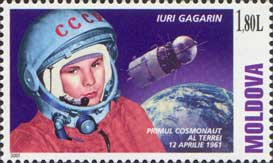
2001 stamp of Moldova shows Yuri Gagarin, the first human in space.

Western academicians published various analyses of the post-Soviet states' development, claiming that the dissolution was followed by a severe drop in economic and social conditions in these countries, including a rapid increase in poverty, crime, corruption, unemployment, homelessness, rates of disease, infant mortality and domestic violence, as well as demographic losses, income inequality and the rise of an oligarchical class, along with decreases in calorie intake, life expectancy, adult literacy, and income. Between 1988–1989 and 1993–1995, the Gini ratio (a measure of inequality) increased by an average of 9 percentage points for all former Soviet republics. According to Western analysis, the economic shocks that accompanied wholesale privatization were associated with sharp increases in mortality, A 2026 Lancet preprint estimates 15.9 million deaths in former Soviet states through to 2019 occurred due to its dissolution, accounting for demographic shift and hampered development. Russia, Kazakhstan, Latvia, Lithuania, and Estonia saw a tripling of unemployment and a 42% increase in male death rates between 1991 and 1994, and in the following decades, only five or six of the post-communist states are on a path to joining the wealthy capitalist West while most are falling behind, some to such an extent that it will take over fifty years to catch up to where they were before the fall of the Soviet Bloc. As of 2011, the experience of the former Soviet republics was mixed, with some having recovered in terms of gross domestic product and others not. There are large wealth disparities, and many post-soviet economies are described as oligarchic.

Since the dissolution of the Soviet Union, annual polling by the Levada Center has shown that over 50% of Russia's population regretted this event, with the only exception to this being in 2012 when support for the Soviet Union dipped below 50 percent. A 2018 poll showed that 66% of Russians regretted the fall of the Soviet Union, setting a 15-year record, and the majority of these regretting opinions came from people older than 55. In 2020, polls conducted by the Levada Center found that 75% of Russians agreed that the Soviet era was the greatest era in their country's history.

According to the New Russia Barometer (NRB) polls by the Centre for the Study of Public Policy, 50% of Russian respondents reported a positive impression of the Soviet Union in 1991. This increased to about 75% of NRB respondents in 2000, dropping slightly to 71% in 2009. Throughout the 2000s, an average of 32% of NRB respondents supported the restoration of the Soviet Union.

In a 2021 poll, a record 70% of Russians indicated they had a mostly/very favourable view of Joseph Stalin. In Armenia, 12% of respondents said the USSR collapse did good, while 66% said it did harm. In Kyrgyzstan, 16% of respondents said the collapse of the USSR did good, while 61% said it did harm. In a 2018 Rating Sociological Group poll, 47% of Ukrainian respondents had a positive opinion of Soviet leader Leonid Brezhnev, who ruled the Soviet Union from 1964 to 1982, while viewing Lenin, Stalin, and Gorbachev very negatively. A 2021 poll conducted by the Levada Center found that 49% of Russians prefer the USSR's political system, while 18% prefer the current political system and 16% would prefer a Western democracy. A further 62% of people polled preferred the Soviet system of central planning, while 24% prefer a market-based system. According to the Levada Center's polls, the primary reasons cited for Soviet nostalgia are the advantages of the shared economic union between the Soviet republics, including perceived financial stability. This was referenced by up to 53% of respondents in 2016. At least 43% also lamented the loss of the Soviet Union's global political superpower status. About 31% cited the loss of social trust and capital. The remainder of the respondents cited a mix of reasons ranging from practical travel difficulties to a sense of national displacement.

The 1941–1945 period of World War II is still known in Russia as the 'Great Patriotic War'. The war became a topic of great importance in cinema, literature, history lessons at school, the mass media, and the arts. As a result of the massive losses suffered by the military and civilians during the conflict, Victory Day celebrated on 9 May is still one of the most important and emotional dates in Russia. Catherine Wanner asserts that Victory Day commemorations are a vehicle for Soviet nostalgia, as they "kept alive a mythology of Soviet grandeur, of solidarity among the Sovietskii narod, and of a sense of self as citizen of a superpower state".

Russian Victory Day parades are organized annually in most cities, with the central military parade taking place in Moscow (just as during the Soviet times). Additionally, the recently introduced Immortal Regiment on 9 May sees millions of Russians carry the portraits of their relatives who fought in the war. Russia also retains other Soviet holidays, such as the Defender of the Fatherland Day (23 February), International Women's Day (8 March), and International Workers' Day.

=== In the former Soviet republics ===
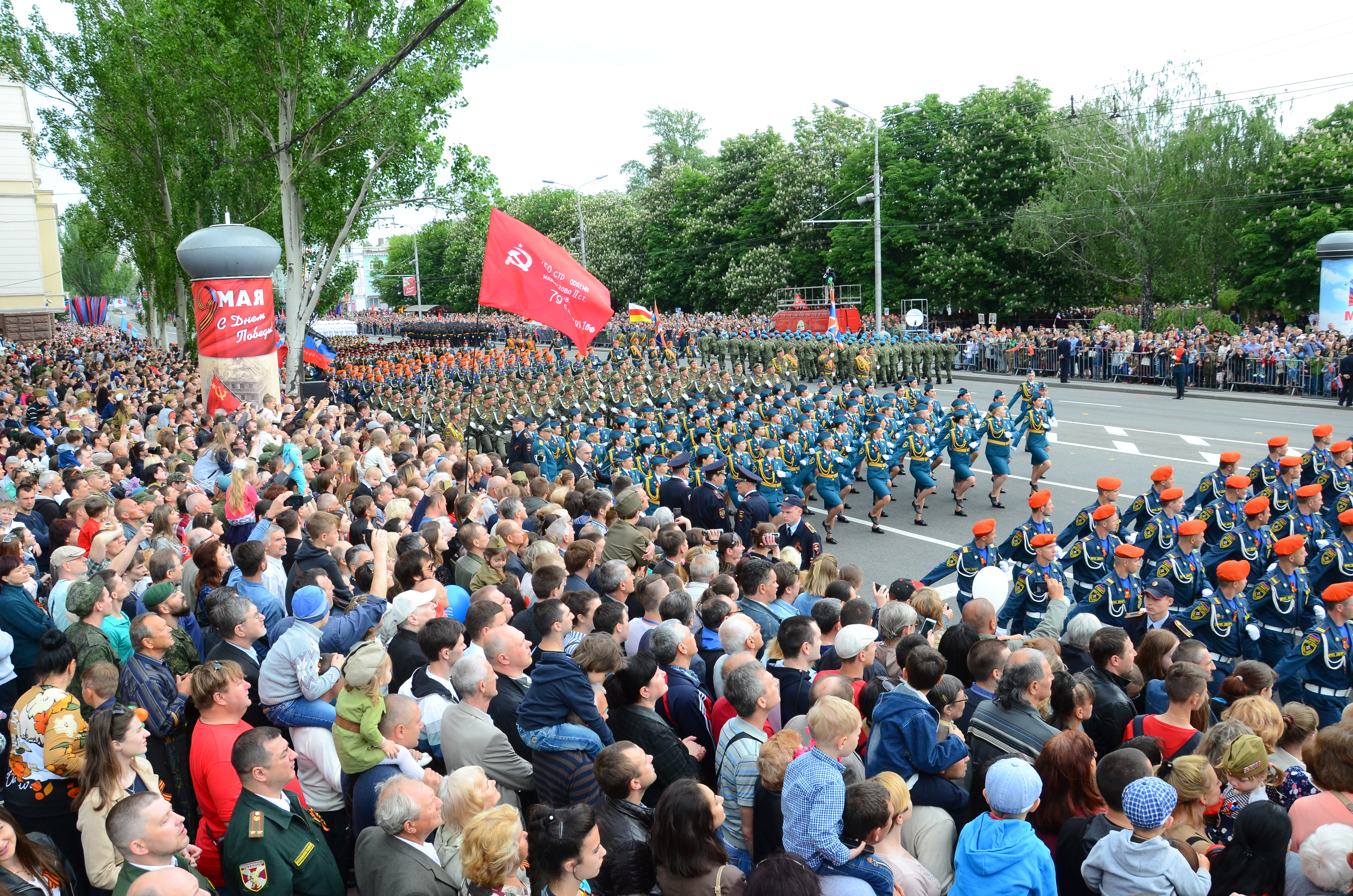
People in the Donetsk People's Republic celebrate the annual Victory Day over Germany, 9 May 2018

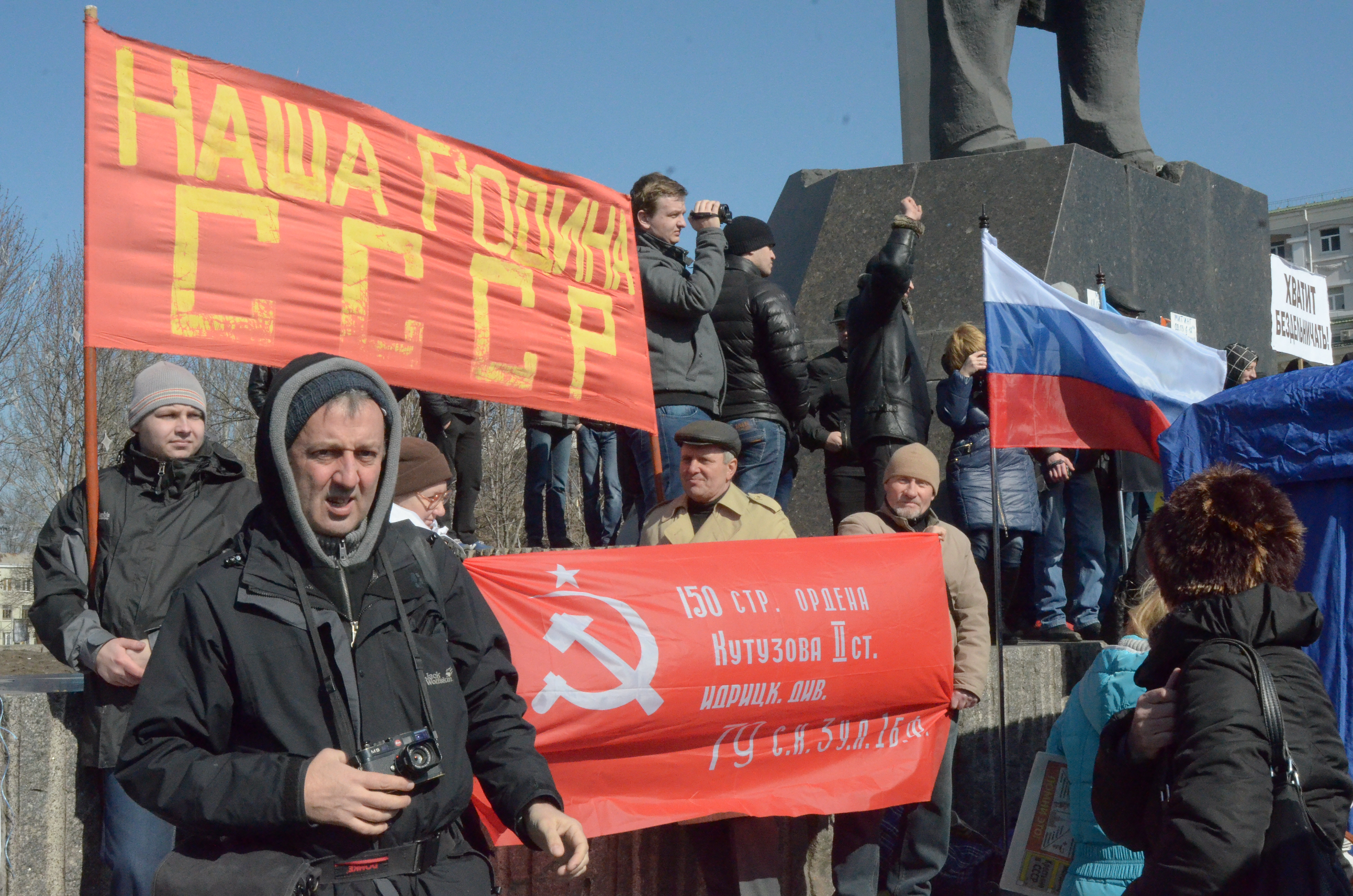
Protest against Ukrainian decommunization policies in Donetsk, 2014. The red banner reads, "Our homeland USSR".

In some post-Soviet republics, there is a more negative view of the USSR, although there is no unanimity on the matter. In large part due to the Holodomor, ethnic Ukrainians have a negative view of the Soviet Union. Russian-speaking Ukrainians of Ukraine's southern and eastern regions have a more positive view of the USSR. In some countries with internal conflict, there is also nostalgia for the USSR, especially for refugees of the post-Soviet conflicts who have been forced to flee their homes and have been displaced. The many Russian enclaves in the former USSR republics such as Transnistria have in a general a positive remembrance of it.

=== For China ===
As its counterpart as a powerful communist state, the Chinese Communist Party (CCP) has continually placed an emphasis on understanding the Soviet Union and its collapse as lessons for itself. In 2011, the CCP completed a study focusing on four reasons for the Soviet collapse. First, Gorbachev's rapid pursuit of democracy which undermined the centrality of the Communist Party. Second, rapid privatization of state-owned enterprises. Third, the end of the ideological monopoly of the Communist Party, leading to historical nihilism and attacks on socialism. Fourth, the West's promotion of a peaceful evolution, cultivating a pro-West "fifth column" in Soviet society.

A 2023 Center for Strategic and International Studies report argued modern Chinese scholarship's attributes the Soviet collapse primarily to its concept of historical nihilism, equated to the penetration of Western ideas into society. In December 1989, then-leader Jiang Zemin first attributed both the fall of communism in Eastern Europe and the Tiananmen Square protests to historical nihilism. A second current in Chinese writing are from Sovietologists who argue the Communist Party of the Soviet Union's institutions and policies was more responsible for collapse than its ideology. Despite Xi Jinping's focus on the historical nihilism current, he stated in 2021 "the Soviet Communist Party separated itself from the people and became a privileged bureaucratic group." The report also noted that between 1960 and 1980, China's state propaganda chose to publish "gray-cover books" (Chinese: 灰皮书, romanized: huī pí shū), a large range of socialist and anti-socialist foreign literature criticizing the Soviet system. These included Leon Trotsky's The Revolution Betrayed and Stalin, works of Eduard Bernstein and Karl Kautsky, Milovan Djilas' The New Class, and Friedrich Hayek's The Road to Serfdom. The report suggested these publications influenced interest in the Soviet failures among Chinese leaders Xi, Jiang, and Deng Xiaoping.

=== For the political left ===
==== Criticism ====
The left's view of the USSR is complex. While some leftists regard the USSR as an example of state capitalism or that it was an oligarchical state, other leftists admire Vladimir Lenin and the Russian Revolution. Council communists generally view the USSR as failing to create class consciousness, turning into a corrupt state in which the elite controlled society.

Trotskyists believe that the ascendancy of the Stalinist bureaucracy ensured a degenerated or deformed workers' state, where the capitalist elite have been replaced by an unaccountable bureaucratic elite and there is no true democracy or workers' control of industry. In particular, American Trotskyist David North noted that the generation of bureaucrats that rose to power under Stalin's tutelage presided over the stagnation and breakdown of the Soviet Union.

Many anti-Stalinist leftists are extremely critical of Soviet authoritarianism and repression. Much of the criticism it receives is centred around massacres in the Soviet Union, the centralized hierarchy present in the USSR and mass political repression as well as violence towards government critics and political dissidents such as other leftists. Critics also point towards its failure to implement any substantial worker cooperatives or implementing worker liberation, as well as corruption and the Soviet authoritarian nature.

Anarchists are also critical of the country, labelling the Soviet system as red fascism. Factors contributing to the anarchist animosity towards the USSR included the Soviet destruction of the Makhnovist movement after an initial alliance, the suppression of the anarchist Kronstadt rebellion, and the defeat of the rival anarchist factions by the Soviet-supported Communist faction during the Spanish Civil War.

Maoists also have a mixed opinion on the USSR, viewing it negatively during the Sino-Soviet Split and denouncing it as revisionist and reverted to capitalism. The Chinese government in 1963 articulated its criticism of the USSR's system and promoted China's ideological line as an alternative.

After the dissolution of the Soviet Union, the Japanese Communist Party (JCP) released a press statement titled "We welcome the end of a party which embodied the historical evil of great power chauvinism and hegemonism".

Noam Chomsky called the collapse of the Soviet Union "a small victory for socialism, not only because of the fall of one of the most anti-socialist states in the world, where working people had fewer rights than in the West, but also because it freed the term socialism from the burden of being associated in the propaganda systems of East and West with Soviet tyranny—for the East, in order to benefit from the aura of authentic socialism, for the West, in order to demonize the concept."

==== Praise ====
A 1986 study published in the American Journal of Public Health claimed that, citing World Bank data, the Soviet model provided a better quality of life and human development than market economies at the same level of economic development in most cases.

Some scholars on the left have posited that the end of the Soviet Union and communism as a global force allowed neoliberal capitalism to become a global system, which has resulted in rising economic inequality.

In her 2012 book The Communist Horizon, Jodi Dean argued that there is a double standard among all sides of the political spectrum, including conservatives, liberals, and social democrats, in how communism and capitalism are perceived nearly two decades after the dissolution of the Soviet Union. Dean stated that the worst excesses of capitalism are often minimized, while communism is often equated only with the Soviet Union, and experiments in Eastern Europe, Latin America, Africa, and Asia are often ignored, with an emphasis placed on the Stalin era and its violent excesses including gulags, purges, droughts and famines, and almost no consideration for the industrialization and modernization of the Soviet economy, the successes of Soviet science (such as the Soviet space program), or the rise in the standard of living for the once predominantly agrarian society. The dissolution of the Soviet Union is therefore seen as the proof that communism cannot work, allowing for all left-wing criticism of the excesses of neoliberal capitalism to be silenced, for the alternatives would supposedly inevitably result in economic inefficiency and violent authoritarianism.

Michael Parenti's 1997 book Blackshirts and Reds takes the controversial position of defending the Soviet Union and other communist countries from reflexive condemnation, arguing that they featured a number of advantages over capitalist countries, e.g., by ensuring less economic inequality. He later argues that the Soviet Union's "well-publicized deficiencies and injustices" were exacerbated by the Russian Civil War, the Nazi-led multinational invasion, and by non-military modes of capitalist intervention against the Eastern Bloc. Moreover, he claims that "pure socialists" and "left anticommunists" had failed to specify a viable alternative to the "siege socialism" implemented in the Soviet model. Parenti argued the Soviet Union played a crucial role in "tempering the worst impulses of Western capitalism and imperialism" that in the post-Cold War era is "no longer restrained by a competing system" and is now "rolling back the many gains that working people in the West have won over the years".

Many communists laud that there was generally no unemployment in communist states and all citizens were guaranteed housing, schooling, healthcare and public transport at little or no cost. Also, praise Stalin's achievement in defeating nazism, and what they perceive as his efforts to combat racism and misogyny. Arguing as well that most gains from social democracy in Europe were due to progress in communist states.

In their 2004 book Socialism Betrayed, historian Roger Keeran and economist Thomas Kenny reject the claim that the Soviet Union's collapse was due to popular discontent among the Soviet public or the lack of Liberal democracy or that the collapse was inevitable and the many problems which existed in the Soviet Union were not soluble within the framework of socialism. Arguing instead, that the collapse was due to revisionism, starting with Khrushchev's second economy, and culminating with Gorbachev's Perestroika. Urging that the collapse was due to deviations from Communism, that should serve as lessons for current and future Communist states.

Economists Allin F. Cottrell and Paul Cockshott defended and argued for a return to Soviet-type economic planning in their 1993 book Towards a New Socialism.

=== For the political right ===
Both liberals and neoconservatives in the United States celebrated the dissolution of the Soviet Union. Ideas such as Francis Fukuyama's end of history and Charles Krauthammer's unipolar moment gained prominence to describe the victory of Western liberal democracy. At the same time, both sides of the political spectrum in the US criticized the George H. W. Bush administration for its comparative cautiousness and political support of Gorbachev over more pro-democracy and nationalist forces in the Soviet Union.

== See also ==
- Outline of the Soviet Union
- Baltic states under Soviet rule (1944–1991)
- Ideocracy – State governed by a particular ideology
- Neo-Stalinism – Movement to revive Stalinist ideas and governance
- Orphans in the Soviet Union
- Russification – Measures to increase the influence of Russian culture and language
- Second Cold War – Term referring to heightened tensions in the 21st century
- Soviet patriotism – Patriotism theory developed by Vladimir Lenin
- Sovietization – Adoption of Soviet political system and mentality
- Succession, continuity, and legacy of the Soviet Union

== Bibliography ==
- Ambler, John; Shaw, Denis J.B.; Symons, Leslie (1985). Soviet and East European Transport Problems. Taylor & Francis. ISBN 978-0-7099-0557-8.
- Comrie, Bernard (1981). The Languages of the Soviet Union. Cambridge University Press (CUP) Archive. ISBN 978-0-521-29877-3.
- Crump, Laurien (2015). The Warsaw Pact Reconsidered: International Relations in Eastern Europe, 1955–1969. Routledge.
- Davies, Robert; Wheatcroft, Stephen (2004). The Industrialisation of Soviet Russia Volume 5: The Years of Hunger: Soviet Agriculture 1931–1933. Palgrave Macmillan. ISBN 978-0-230-23855-8.
- Fischer, Louis (1964). The Life of Lenin. London: Weidenfeld and Nicolson.
- Fischer, Stanley; Easterly, William (1994). "The Soviet Economic Decline, Historical and Republican Data" (PDF). World Bank. Archived (PDF) from the original on 1 March 2011.
- Goldstein, Erik (2013). The First World War Peace Settlements, 1919–1925. London: Routledge. ISBN 978-1-317-88367-8.
- Habibov, Nazim (June 2013). "Who Wants to Redistribute? An Analysis of 14 Post-Soviet Nations". Social Policy & Administration. 47 (3): 262–286. doi:10.1111/j.1467-9515.2011.00834.x.
- Janz, Denis (1998). World Christianity and Marxism. New York: Oxford University Press. ISBN 978-0-19-511944-2.
- Lane, David Stuart (1992). Soviet Society under Perestroika. Routledge. ISBN 978-0-415-07600-5.
- Lee, Stephen J. (2003). Lenin and Revolutionary Russia. London: Routledge. ISBN 978-0-415-28718-0.
- Leggett, George (1981). The Cheka: Lenin's Political Police. Oxford: Oxford University Press. ISBN 978-0-19-822552-2.
- Lewin, Moshe (1969). Lenin's Last Struggle. Translated by Sheridan Smith, A. M. London: Faber and Faber.
- Libman, Alexander; Obydenkova, Anastassia V. (2019). "Historical Legacy of the Communist Party of the Soviet Union and Inequality: Evidence from Post-Communist Regions". Post-Communist Economies. 31 (6): 699–724. doi:10.1080/14631377.2019.1607440. hdl:10261/201912.
- Mccauley, Martin (2014). The Rise and Fall of the Soviet Union. Taylor & Francis. ISBN 978-1-317-86783-8.
- Michalski, Tomasz; Hlynskyy, Nazar (2009). "Economic transformation disparity in European post-Soviet countries in the period of transformation". In Palmowski, Tadeusz; Vaitekūnas, Stasys (eds.). The Problems of Development and International Cooperation in the Region of the Southern Baltic. Wydawnictwo "Bernardinum. pp. 134–143. ISBN 978-83-7380-819-5.
- Ovcharova, Lilia; Biryukova, Svetlana (2018). "Poverty and the Poor in Post-Soviet Russia". In Rauhut, Daniel; Hatti, Neelambar (eds.). Poverty, Politics and the Poverty of Politics. B.R. Publishing Corporation. pp. 157–183.
- Pons, Silvio; Service, Robert (2010). A Dictionary of 20th-Century Communism. Princeton University Press. ISBN 978-1-4008-3452-5.
- Rayfield, Donald (2004). Stalin and His Hangmen: An Authoritative Portrait of a Tyrant and Those Who Served Him. Viking Press. ISBN 978-0-375-75771-6.
- Read, Christopher (2005). From Tsar to Soviets. Taylor & Francis. ISBN 978-1-135-36625-4.
- Russell, Martin (April 2018). Socioeconomic inequality in Russia (PDF) (Report). European Parliament.
- Ryan, James (2012). Lenin's Terror: The Ideological Origins of Early Soviet State Violence. London: Routledge. ISBN 978-1-138-81568-1.
- Service, Robert (2000). Lenin: A Biography. London: Macmillan. ISBN 978-0-333-72625-9.
- Service, Robert (2005). A History of Modern Russia from Nicholas II to Vladimir Putin. Harvard University Press. ISBN 978-0-674-01801-3.
- Simon, Gerard (1974). Church, State, and Opposition in the U.S.S.R. Berkeley and Los Angeles: University of California Press. ISBN 978-0-520-02612-4.
- Stewart, Susan; Klein, Margarete; Schmitz, Andrea; Schröder, Hans-Henning (2012). "Introduction". In Stewart, Susan; Klein, Margarete; Schröder, Hans-Henning (eds.). Presidents, Oligarchs and Bureaucrats: Forms of Rule in the Post-Soviet Space. Ashgate Publishing. pp. 1–14. ISBN 978-1-138-27879-0.
- Volkogonov, Dmitri (1994). Lenin: Life and Legacy. Translated by Shukman, Harold. London: HarperCollins. ISBN 978-0-00-255123-6.
- White, James D. (2001). Lenin: The Practice and Theory of Revolution. European History in Perspective. Basingstoke, England: Palgrave. ISBN 978-0-333-72157-5.
- Wilson, David (1983). The Demand for Energy in the Soviet Union. Taylor & Francis. ISBN 978-0-7099-2704-4.
- Wheatcroft, Stephen (1996). "The Scale and Nature of German and Soviet Repression and Mass Killings, 1930–45" (PDF). Europe-Asia Studies. 48 (8): 1319–1353. doi:10.1080/09668139608412415. JSTOR 152781. Archived from the original (PDF) on 17 July 2011.
