= Rhea Clyman =

Canadian journalist

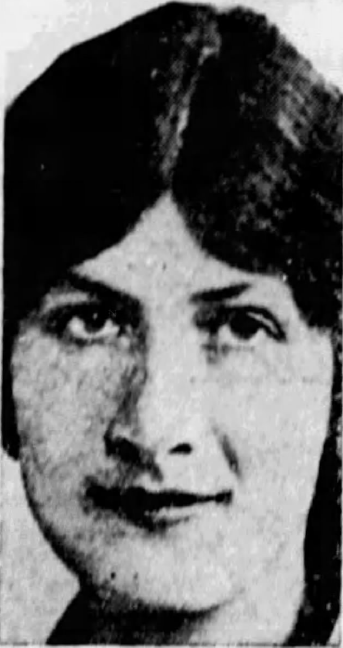
Rhea Clyman, c. 1932

Rhea Clyman (originally spelled Kleiman; July 4, 1904 – July 9, 1981) was a Polish-born Canadian journalist who worked as a foreign correspondent in the USSR for four years before being expelled in 1932.

== Early life ==
Rhea Clyman was born in Poland on July 4, 1904, to a Jewish family. Her parents were Solomon and Anna Kleiman. They had five children. In 1906 the family moved to Canada and settled in Toronto, Ontario. When Clyman was six, she was hit by a streetcar and badly injured, requiring the amputation of one leg and many subsequent hospital visits. Her father died around the same time, and at 11, Clyman left school and began working in a factory to help support her family, continuing her education by night class.

== Career ==
As a young woman, Clyman worked in New York before moving to London, Paris, Berlin and finally Moscow. There, she worked as a researcher for New York Times reporter Walter Duranty, and also reported for the London Daily Express.

From 1928, Clyman was the Moscow correspondent for the Toronto Evening Telegram, reporting on transformations underway as a result of Joseph Stalin's first Five Year Plan. In 1932, she travelled to the far north of Russia to visit a secretive penal colony run by the OGPU in Karelia, on the border with Finland. Following this trip, she drove 5,000 miles by car with two women from Atlanta throughout the southwestern Soviet Union. On the way, they encountered starving Ukrainian peasants in Kharkiv, and witnessed famine conditions in southern Russia and the Caucuses. When Clyman arrived in Tbilisi, Georgia, she was arrested and ultimately expelled from the USSR for allegedly reporting false news. Soviet state media denounced her as a "provocateur from the bourgeois camp."

From 1933 to 1938, Clyman worked in Nazi Germany, reporting for the London Daily Telegraph. In 1938, she had to leave the country urgently because of growing hostility towards Jews. The plane she was travelling in crashed en route to Amsterdam; Clyman was injured but survived and recovered.

From 1938 to 1941, Clyman worked in Montreal as a correspondent for the London Daily Express, after which she moved to New York, where she worked for Reuters, before her retirement and eventual death on July 9, 1981. She never married or had children.

== In popular culture ==
Actress Beata Pozniak portrayed Clyman in Mr. Jones, a 2019 feature film about Gareth Jones, a Welsh journalist who also reported on the Soviet famine of 1930-1933.

Clyman is the focus of the 2018 documentary, Hunger for Truth: The Rhea Clyman Story.
