= Eugene Lyons =

American journalist and writer (1898–1985)

Eugene Lyons (July 1, 1898 – January 7, 1985), born Yevgeny Natanovich Privin (Russian: Евгений Натанович Привин), was a Russian-born American journalist and writer. A fellow traveler of Communism in his younger years, Lyons became highly critical of the Soviet Union after several years there as a correspondent of United Press International. Lyons also wrote a biography of President Herbert Hoover.

== Early life ==
Eugene Lyons was born on July 1, 1898, in Uzlyany, then part of the Russian Empire and now part of Belarus, to a Jewish family. His parents were Nathan Gebelow and Minnie Privin. He immigrated with his parents to the US in 1907, and he grew up among the tenements of the Lower East Side of New York City. "I thought myself a 'socialist' almost as soon as I thought at all," Lyons recalled in his memoirs. As a youth, he attended a Socialist Sunday School on East Broadway, where he sang socialist hymns such as "The Internationale" and "The Red Flag". Later, he enrolled as a member of the Young People's Socialist League, youth section of the Socialist Party of America (SPA).

In 1916, Lyons enrolled in the College of the City of New York before he transferred to Columbia University the next year. During his school years he worked as an assistant to an English teacher in an adult education course.

== Career ==
=== Early career ===
During World War I, Lyons was enlisted in the Students Army Training Corps, an adjunct of the US Army. With the end of the war in November 1918, Lyons was demobilized and honorably discharged. He later recalled that on the day he removed his uniform, he wrote his very first story, a piece for Elizabeth Gurley Flynn and the Workers Defense Union, which she organized on behalf of the Industrial Workers of the World. Lyons worked for the Workers Defense Union for some time and composed news releases for the Socialist daily newspaper New York Call and other left-wing publications. "It was a time of raids on radicals, 'Treat-'em-rough!' hooliganism, and mass deportations," Lyons later recalled.

Lyons then went to work as a reporter for the Erie, Pennsylvania Dispatch-Herald. He also worked briefly for the New York paper Financial America and at writing copy in the publicity departments of two motion picture companies.

In the fall of 1920, with revolution in the wind in Italy and dreaming of becoming the next John Reed, Lyons made his way to Naples and bore credentials of the Federated Press news service and the monthly magazine The Liberator. En route, he met another aspiring correspondent bearing identical credentials, Norman H. Matson, and the pair decided to spend the next six months sharing expenses in pursuit of their common goal. Versed in the ongoing case against the Italian-American anarchists Sacco and Vanzetti, Lyons made the pilgrimage to Sacco's native village of Torremaggiore, where Sacco's older brother Sabino was the mayor. Lyons's Italian experiences were later put to use in his first book, The Life and Death of Sacco and Vanzetti, which was published in 1927 by the Communist-affiliated International Publishers in which he argued the case for the pair's innocence.

In Italy, Lyons was approached by an official of the Soviet Union's new Italian embassy to become a secret courier. The Soviets thought that as an American, he could cross frontiers safely, but before anything came of that, Lyons was arrested by the Italian police as a radical and expelled into France.

Back in America, Lyons spent 1921 and most of 1922 in Boston working for the defense of Sacco and Vanzetti. He met the pair frequently in prison.

In the fall of 1922, Lyons became editor of Soviet Russia Pictorial, the monthly magazine of the Friends of Soviet Russia, an organization that was closely connected with the then-underground Communist Party USA (CPUSA). Lyons later recalled that "unhesitatingly, I cast my lot with the Communists. I devoted the next five years largely to Soviet activities." After Soviet Russia Pictorial was closed down in 1924, Lyons became a correspondent for the Soviet news agency TASS.

=== USSR ===
Lyons' work for TASS led to his becoming the United Press (UP) correspondent in Moscow, where he lived from February 8, 1928, until January 30, 1934. Instead of reporting from the United States for the Soviet press, he would now write on Soviet events for an American audience. While Lyons never joined the CPUSA, he had close ties with it and was considered a fellow traveler. The UP thought that Lyons' political background and the close contacts it implied would give him and it an edge over its competition in delivering news from the Soviet Union. Lyons remained the UP's man in Moscow from 1928 to 1934, which gradually transformed him from a friend of the Soviet state and communism to a tireless and fierce critic of both.

Lyons was initially supportive of the Soviet regime and found its repressive actions credible. He covered the 1928 Shakhty Trial of mining engineers, which is now regarded by historians as a precursor to the show trials of the late 1930s. Lyons saw that the trial was unfair and that the accused were denied an opportunity to fully defend themselves, but he still believed that they must have been guilty of something.

UP's choice of Lyons paid dividends in 1930. On November 22, he was summoned to the Kremlin for a surprise interview with Joseph Stalin, a move to eliminate rumors circulating in the West about the Soviet leader's demise. Lyons thus became one of the first Western journalists to interview Stalin, and his report of the encounter represented a major "scoop." Lyons later recounted his meeting with the Soviet leader, a conversation that was conducted in Russian with the occasional help of a translator:

One cannot live in the shadow of Stalin's legend without coming under its spell. My pulse, I am sure, was high. No sooner, however, had I stepped across the threshold than diffidence and nervousness fell away. Stalin met me at the door and shook hands, smiling. There was a certain shyness in his smile and the handshake was not perfunctory. He was remarkably unlike the scowling, self-important dictator of popular imagination. His every gesture was a rebuke to the thousand little bureaucrats who had inflicted their puny greatness upon me in these Russian years..
'Comrade Stalin,' I began the interview, 'may I quote you to the effect that you have not been assassinated?'
He laughed. At such close range, there was not a trace of the Napoleonic quality one sees in his self-conscious camera or oil portraits. The shaggy mustache, framing a sensual mouth and a smile nearly as full of teeth as Teddy Roosevelt's, gave his swarthy face a friendly, almost benignant look.
'Yes, you may,' he said, 'except that I hate to take the bread out of the mouth of the Riga correspondents.'

(Charles Malamuth served as assistant to Lyons and accompanied him to the interview with Stalin.)

Lyons' interview with Stalin ran two hours in duration, joined midway by Commissar of Defense Kliment Voroshilov. Lyons' cable detailing the interview was widely reproduced across America and was hailed by an editorial in the New York Daily News as "the most distinguished piece of reporting of this year, if not the last four or five years."

On the heels of his journalistic coup, Lyons returned to the United States for a brief visit in March 1931, making a lecture tour to 20 Northeastern cities organized by UP. Lyons had already begun to harbor doubts about the violence and repression associated with the Soviet regime and was torn between "looming doubts and waning loyalties," but Lyons found himself engaged to speak mostly before businessmen's luncheon clubs. "Looking into their self-satisfied faces, I could forget my doubts," Lyons later recalled. He delivered a blinkered defense of the revolution to his assembled audiences.

"Had I remained in America permanently I might have evolved a new, if badly scarred and patched, enthusiasm," Lyons wrote in his memoirs. "I might have ended by contributing high-minded lies to The New Masses and slept happily ever after." But Lyons did return to the Soviet Union later that year. He found the GPU imposing ever-increasing terror against recalcitrant peasants, anyone suspected of secretly holding gold or foreign currency, and those accused of economic crimes such as sabotage:

The newspapers were filled with the same braggadocio and threats. Victories, successes, triumphs, but the plan for spring sowing far behind; three shots for sabotaging the rabbit-breeding plans; enginemen and signalmen shot for counter-revolutionary negligence in connection with a disaster on the Kursk line; eighty-four arrested for forging bread cards. Another internal loan was being oversubscribed — 'voluntary' contributions of a month's wages or two months' wages. Another blast-furnace started in Magnitogorsk. Poincaré-War and agents of imperialism and dastardly kulaks and Left-Right and Right-Left deviators and secret Trotskyists and heil Stalin and 2 + 2 = 5.

His doubts gradually overwhelmed his faith in the revolution.

Lyons was among the earliest writers to criticize The New York Times Moscow reporter Walter Duranty for journalistic dishonesty attempting to downplay the 1932 famine. Writing about Duranty in 1941, Lyons said, "Of all his elliptical writing, perhaps his handling of the famine was the most celebrated. It was the logical extreme of his oft-repeated assertion that 'you can't make an omelet without breaking eggs.' Now he made his omelet by referring to the famine as 'undernourishment.'"

Ironically, Lyons himself had played a role in the journalistic coverup of the 1932–33 terror famine in Ukraine when he denounced British journalist Gareth Jones as a liar. Jones had written initial reports of the famine and published the first significant reports of the massive famine in the Manchester Guardian, only to have the veracity of his reporting denounced by Lyons, Duranty, and others in the Moscow press corps. Unlike Duranty, however, Lyons was willing to later engage in self-criticism of his own role and wrote, "throwing down Jones was as unpleasant a chore as fell to any of us in years of juggling facts to please dictatorial regimes — but throw him down we did, unanimously and in almost identical formulas of equivocation. Poor Gareth Jones must have been the most surprised human being alive when the facts he so painstakingly garnered from our mouths were snowed under by our denials."

=== United States ===
After his return to the United States early in 1934, Lyons wrote two books about his Moscow years. The first was a rather subdued work, Moscow Carrousel. Published in 1935, it was followed by a far more outspoken account of events, Assignment in Utopia, which was published in 1937.

Lyons' writing directly influenced George Orwell. In his seminal novel Nineteen Eighty-Four, Orwell drew upon a chapter title from Assignment in Utopia, "Two Plus Two Equals Five." Lyons recalled that it was a commonly used slogan in the Soviet Union under Stalinism, especially during the drive to complete the first five-year plan in just four years. Orwell adapted the slogan as a metaphor for official totalitarian lying and depicted the same slogan also being used for secret police gaslighting of dissident intellectuals.

Following his return from the Soviet Union, Lyons very briefly flirted with Trotskyism. Leon Trotsky gave credit to Assignment in Utopia for revealing the Stalin administration's systematic use of antisemitism for political legitimacy; he judged the book "interesting, though not profound". Already in 1938, however, Trotsky rebuked Max Shachtman for giving a platform to Lyons, who had developed links to White Russians, and by 1939 he was more interested in addressing contradictions and splits in the CPUSA than the "individual sweatings" of Lyons.

After two books on his Moscow experiences and a biography of Stalin, Lyons set to work on a full-length study of CPUSA influence on American cultural life in the 1930s, The Red Decade. The book was not popular when first published in 1941, however, as very soon after it saw print, the Soviet Union was invaded by Nazi Germany and joined a military alliance with the Western Allies during World War II. The book's fame came only later, during the era of McCarthyism, when its title became a byword for the popular front alliance between Communists, social democrats, and liberals during the Great Depression.

In later years, Lyons' political views shifted to the right, and for a time, he was editor with Reader's Digest, Plain Talk and National Review. He was involved with the broadcasts of Radio Free Europe and was also a member of the American Jewish League Against Communism.

In the early 1940s and the Second Red Scare that followed World War II, Lyons was a frequent contributor to the popular press on anticommunist themes and criticized leftists whose he deemed inadequate in their refusal to denounce Stalinism. In The American Mercury, Lyons was critical of First Lady Eleanor Roosevelt for lending her prestige to a gathering of the American Youth Congress, a front joint organization bringing together Communist and Socialist student groups. In 1947, Lyons attacked former Vice President Henry A. Wallace as a former appeaser of the Soviet police state, who still refused to face up to the true nature of the regime.

Writing for the American Legion in 1950, Lyons, as a former Soviet spy himself, expressed support for allegations that the KGB and the GRU had recruited highly placed moles within the United States Federal Government. He also praised the work of the House Committee on Un-American Activities for investigating the covert operations of alleged spies recruited from within the CPUSA and for exposing other alleged Soviet spies in the Government's employ.

Since 1951 Lyons was the chairman of the American Committee for the Liberation of the Peoples of Russia. Lyons was a member of the Citizens Committee for a Free Cuba, founded in 1963. He also sat on the National Advisory Board of Young Americans for Freedom.

In addition to his work as a freelance journalist, Lyons wrote biographies. He published a widely-read biography of former President Herbert Hoover in 1964. In 1966, he published a biography of his maternal first cousin David Sarnoff, the chairman of RCA and founder of NBC.

Lyons returned to the topic of why the Russian Revolution produced a police state rather than parliamentary democracy and the rule of law in his final book, Workers' Paradise Lost, published in 1967.

== Death and legacy ==
Lyons died age 86 on January 7, 1985, in New York City.

His papers are housed at the Hoover Institution, Stanford University, and in the Special Collections department of Knight Library at the University of Oregon in Eugene.

In Agnieszka Holland's biographical thriller Mr. Jones (2019), Lyons was portrayed by Edward Wolstenholme.

== Works ==
- The Life and Death of Sacco and Vanzetti. New York: International Publishers, 1927.
- Modern Moscow. London: Hurst & Blackett, 1935.
- Moscow Carrousel. New York: Alfred A. Knopf, 1935.
- Assignment in Utopia. New York: Harcourt, Brace, 1937.
- Stalin, Czar of all the Russias. Philadelphia: Lippincott, 1940.
- The Red Decade: The Stalinist Penetration of America. Indianapolis: Bobbs-Merrill, 1941.
- Our Unknown Ex-President: A Portrait of Herbert Hoover. Garden City, NY: Doubleday, 1948.
- Our Secret Allies: The Peoples of Russia. New York: Duell, Sloan and Pearce, 1953.
- Herbert Hoover: A Biography. Garden City, NY: Doubleday,1964.
- David Sarnoff: A Biography. New York: Harper & Row, 1966.
- Workers' Paradise Lost: Fifty Years of Soviet Communism: A Balance Sheet. New York: Funk and Wagnalls, 1967.

== See also ==
- Gareth Jones (journalist)
- Walter Duranty
- Charles Malamuth
