= Mr. Jones (2019 film) =

Film by Agnieszka Holland

- UK theatrical release poster
- Directed by: Agnieszka Holland
- Written by: Andrea Chalupa
- Produced by: Stanisław Dziedzic; Andrea Chalupa; Klaudia Śmieja-Rostworowska
- Starring: James Norton; Vanessa Kirby; Peter Sarsgaard
- Cinematography: Tomasz Naumiuk
- Edited by: Michał Czarnecki
- Music by: Antoni Łazarkiewicz
- Production companies: Film Produkcja; Kinorob; Jones Boy Film
- Distributed by: Kino Świat (Poland); MMD UA (Ukraine); Signature Entertainment (United Kingdom)
- Release dates: 10 February 2019 (Berlinale); 25 October 2019 (Poland); 28 November 2019 (Ukraine); 7 February 2020 (United Kingdom)
- Running time: 141 minutes
- Countries: Poland; Ukraine; United Kingdom
- Languages: English; Ukrainian; Russian; Welsh
- Box office: $2.8 million

Mr. Jones (Mr Jones in the United Kingdom; Polish: Obywatel Jones, lit. 'Citizen Jones'; Ukrainian: «Ціна правди», romanized: Tsina pravdy, lit. 'The Price of Truth') is a 2019 biographical thriller film written and co-produced by Andrea Chalupa and directed by Agnieszka Holland. It is based on the story of Welsh journalist Gareth Jones, who uncovers the truth of the devastating famine (Holodomor) in which millions died in the Ukrainian SSR, Soviet Union.

Critical reviews were largely positive, but there were objections to some historical inaccuracies. The film was selected to compete for the Golden Bear at the 69th Berlin International Film Festival.

== Plot ==
In 1933, Gareth Jones is an ambitious young journalist, who has gained some renown for his interview with Adolf Hitler. The son of an English teacher in the Welsh colony of Hughesovka in Soviet Ukraine, Jones is troubled by the question of how Stalin's Soviet Union can be having a spending spree, as the numbers do not add up. Jones works as a political advisor to David Lloyd George, the former British prime minister, but with funding limited owing to the economic difficulties, and after failing to make his case in a critical meeting, he is made redundant.

Trading on his connections in Britain and in Russia, Jones manages to obtain a Russian visa with the intention of setting up an interview with Stalin. Upon arrival in Moscow, he meets Eugene Lyons, a Russian-American journalist, who is with a party of British engineers from Metropolitan-Vickers; they take him to a party at the home of Walter Duranty and give him cryptic hints that the Soviets are not as enlightened as they make out, and that Stalin's ability to pay for British engineers or new factories may not rest on the famed efficiency of the Ukrainian farms as they have claimed. He is also informed that journalists are forbidden to venture outside of Moscow. Through a chance meeting with fellow British journalist Ada Brooks—who is under close observation by the OGPU, the Soviet secret police—he learns that his contact in Moscow was murdered by the authorities while investigating the supposed Ukrainian agricultural revolution. Armed with this information, Jones alters his documents to make him appear to be still employed by Lloyd George and obtains an invitation to Ukraine by the Soviet foreign minister Maxim Litvinov.

On the train journey south, Jones takes advantage of a brief stop to leave his train and sneak onto another train, which is taking starving peasant workers to Hughesovka—now renamed Stalino. At Stalino, he finds that all of the grain shipments are being immediately sent to Moscow, but he is labelled a foreign spy and forced to flee into the woods. After escaping, he witnesses almost abandoned villages, with the remaining peasants dying in their own homes. After travelling for several days, he is told by locals that the famine has been started deliberately by Moscow. He is then caught by the OGPU.

Taken to a Soviet prison, Jones briefly encounters the engineers whom he met in Moscow, who have now also been accused of espionage. Under interrogation, he is told that he will be sent back to London without charges, with an expectation that he will repeat to the press the story the Soviets wish to be heard: that Ukraine is the breadbasket of the USSR and any stories of a famine are rumours. Only if he does this, will the Russians agree to release the engineers.

Back in London, his publisher introduces him to George Orwell, who persuades Jones to tell the truth for the greater good. In response to Jones's claims, Duranty—who through bribery is using his position to act as a propaganda mouthpiece for Stalin—mobilises his contacts to rebut any stories of famine in Ukraine. Litvinov similarly puts pressure on Lloyd George to force Jones to retract his claims. He refuses, but becomes a pariah as the public turns on him. Out of desperation, he returns to his father's home in Wales, but later hears that the American media mogul William Randolph Hearst is at a nearby stately home that he owns. Jones manages to reach him and persuades him to use his publications to revive the accusations of induced famine. The extra publicity revives public belief in the truth of the Holodomor.

The film ends by recording that Jones died two years later while reporting in Inner Mongolia. Travelling with a fellow journalist who was also a member of the Comintern, he was kidnapped by bandits and executed.

== Cast ==
- James Norton as Gareth Jones
- Vanessa Kirby as Ada Brooks
- Peter Sarsgaard as Walter Duranty
- Kenneth Cranham as David Lloyd George
- Joseph Mawle as George Orwell
- Celyn Jones as Matthew
- Krzysztof Pieczyński as Maxim Litvinov
- Beata Poźniak as Rhea Clyman
- Fenella Woolgar as Miss Stevenson
- Martin Bishop as Sir Ernest Bennett
- Edward Wolstenholme as Eugene Lyons
- Marcin Czarnik as Paul Kleb
- Matthew Marsh as William Randolph Hearst
- Julian Lewis Jones as Major Edgar Jones

== Release ==
Mr. Jones had its world premiere at the 69th Berlin International Film Festival on 10 February 2019. That August, Samuel Goldwyn Films acquired North American distribution rights to the film. The film was released in Poland on 25 October 2019 by Kino Świat, in Ukraine on 28 November 2019 by MMD UA, and in the United Kingdom on 7 February 2020 by Signature Entertainment. Originally scheduled for a 3 April 2020 theatrical release in the United States, the film was instead released in virtual cinemas on 22 May 2020, on digital platforms on 19 June and on video on demand on 3 July.

== Reception ==
On the review aggregator website Rotten Tomatoes, the film holds an approval rating of 86% based on 106 reviews, with an average rating of 6.8/10. The website's critical consensus reads, "Flawed yet fundamentally worthy, Mr. Jones peers into the past to tell a fact-based story that remains troublingly relevant today." On Metacritic, the film has a score of 68 out of 100 based on reviews from 19 critics.

Peter Bradshaw of The Guardian gave the film four out of five, calling it "a bold and heartfelt movie with a real Lean-ian sweep". Tim Robey of The Daily Telegraph gave it three out of five, praising Sarsgaard for his performance and for raising the "sadly untapped" potential of the film. Robey criticised the script and concluded, "There's enough in Mr Jones to make you want a good deal more".

In Sight & Sound, Nick James commented that "Only someone as experienced and cine-literate as Holland could have pulled off such a detailed film, which deftly sketches the context of a true-life story while using the genre conventions of Soviet propaganda against itself".

Kyle Smith of National Review gave the film a favourable review, noting:

To this day, Mr. Jones is all but unknown and his courage is unsung by his inky heirs, whereas Duranty's Pulitzer Prize remains on the books even after a thousand other things have been canceled. Meanwhile, Mr. Jones joins the unconscionably brief list of brutally honest films about Communism.

Jones's great-nephew and current literary executor Philip Colley expressed disappointment with inaccuracies in the film, complaining that,

"The film leads the viewer to believe only Ukraine was affected, but, as my uncle reported, millions were dying across the Soviet Union, “from every part of Russia, from the Volga, Siberia, the North Caucasus, Central Asia”. Gareth was not just a hero of the Ukraine, he was also a hero for people suffering across the Soviet Union. He was a hero for truth."

He added that Jones "didn't witness any dead bodies or any cannibalism, let alone take part in any", and criticising fictional depictions of "Jones meeting George Orwell and seeking an interview with Joseph Stalin as well as the obligatory love interest, even though he had none". Colley also criticised the film for omitting that Jones had maintained contacts with German officials, including high-ranking Nazis, and had even dined with Joseph Goebbels. He further noted that Jones travelled to Ukraine at the invitation of the German Vice Consul in Kharkiv and criticised the depiction of Jones as "languishing in a Soviet jail, having been arrested by Stalin’s infamous NKVD". Colley's brother Nigel had been heavily involved in discussing ideas for the film with screenwriter Andrea Chalupa, but had died in 2018. A spokesperson for the film responded to Philip Colley's criticisms by saying "This project is inspired by true events, and like all narrative films, it adds fictional elements to underscore themes and create a cohesive feature", adding that before Nigel's death there had been plans to make him a historical consultant and allow him to review the script.

== Awards ==
The film won the Grand Prix Golden Lions award at the 44th Polish Film Festival in 2019.

== See also ==
- Mass killings under communist regimes
