= Joan London =

Joan London may refer to:

- Joan London (Australian author) (born 1948), Australian fiction author
- Joan London (American writer) (1901–1971), California author and daughter of Jack London

== See also ==
- Joan Lunden, American TV personality
