= Beata Poźniak =

Polish–American actress (born 1960)

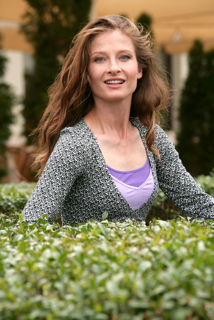
- Beata Poźniak in 2013
- Born: Beata Poźniak; 30 April 1960 (age 66); Gdańsk, Poland
- Education: Master's Degree (High Honors)
- Alma mater: Łódź Film School
- Occupations: Actress, director, producer, writer, artist, activist
- Awards: Earphones Award, Voice Arts Awards; Medal for Merit to Culture – Gloria Artis
- Website: Beata Pozniak official

Beata Poźniak (Polish pronunciation: [bɛˈat̪a ˈpɔʑɲak]; born 30 April 1960) is a Polish-American actress, film director, poet, painter and an Earphones Award-winning narrator. Known for her role as Marina Oswald in Oliver Stone's eight time Oscar nominated JFK. Pozniak won the prestigious Voice Arts Award in the "Outstanding Video Game Character - Best Performance" category for her role of Skarlet, the Blood Queen in Mortal Kombat 11 starring alongside Arnold Schwarzenegger and Sylvester Stallone. In thirty years of Mortal Kombat's franchise, Pozniak is the first and only actress that won in the Best Performance Category.

She is also a human rights activist who introduced the first bill in the history of US Congress to officially recognize International Women's Day in the United States.

== Early life ==
Poźniak was born in Gdańsk, Poland. Her mother was born in Vilnius, Lithuania, and her father's family is from Ukraine. Her parents divorced when she was six years old and she grew up with a single mother in Soviet-ruled Poland during the Cold War. She eventually passed her entrance exam to the National Film School in Łódź PWSFTViT with the highest score in the country, and received a Master's of Fine Arts degree with High Honors at age 22. Her stage debut was playing the role of Justine, symbol of justice, in a Mrożek play, Vatzlav, under the eyes of a government censor. Martial Law was imposed on 13 December 1981. After graduating, she moved to Warsaw where she was assisted in getting necessary documents by Father Jerzy Popiełuszko. In 1984, the priest was murdered because of his support for the Solidarity movement. A film of this incident, To Kill a Priest, was later made by Agnieszka Holland. After arriving in Warsaw she starred in a highly successful theater production of How the Other Half Loves by Alan Ayckbourn. It was during rehearsals for this production that Andrzej Wajda became a mentor to Beata and gave her invaluable guidance for her career. In 1985, before the collapse of the Berlin Wall, Beata immigrated to the United States. Her very first film role, while still in high school, was as an extra in the Academy Award winning film The Tin Drum which happened to be filming near her home. She later made many film appearances and worked as a fashion model and was the calendar girl for Poland's National Soccer team. She is a member of the European Film Academy (EFA)

== Career ==
=== Film and television work ===
Poźniak was discovered by the U.S. audiences when Oliver Stone cast her in JFK as Marina Oswald. This memorable role in an Academy Award-nominated film was her U.S. feature debut and it led to her appearances in over 30 film and TV projects worldwide. After playing Earth Alliance President Susanna Luchenko in Babylon 5 and a fiery young revolutionary in George Lucas' The Young Indiana Jones Chronicles, as well as a sharp scientist Ludmilla in Dark Skies or Eva in Pensacola she becomes known for playing badass female characters. Other powerful roles have included Paramount's JAG where she appeared as an exotic Israeli spy, a double agent working for the Mossad and CIA. In the television series Melrose Place, she created a ground-breaking character, Dr. Katya Petrova, a "straight" woman and mother who decides to marry a gay man - the role that is still very much talked about, making Poźniak one of the show's most popular former cast members. Her other diverse roles include Masha in Mad About You, Raisa on The Drew Carey Show and Tambor, the Japanese nanny in Oliver Stone's Wild Palms miniseries. In the CBS movie of the week A Mother's Gift, she was seen as a character that aged thirty years, whereas in a World War II drama entitled Miriam she played a Catholic woman who risks her life to save a Jewish girl from the Nazis. She also stars as Laina in the interactive movie/video game Psychic Detective, premiered at Sundance Film Festival as the first video game in the New Media category. An experimental film "All These Voices" where she stars as Beata, a World War II Survivor wins a Student Academy Award.

=== Voiceover work ===
Poźniak narrated the bestseller, The Winter Palace: A Novel of Catherine the Great, a 19-hour audiobook for Random House, where she made use of her European background in bringing to life the 78 characters and their colorful accents. After embodying one of the most intriguing women in history, she read another 19 hour story of the Empress of the Night: A Novel of Catherine the Great. This was followed by a teen romance/adventure/sci-fi thriller, "The Illuminae Files", by Amie Kaufman and Jay Kristoff, which won an Audie Award. After that, she co-narrated "The Tsar of Love and Techno" by Anthony Marra which was selected in the Top 5 Best Audiobooks of the year by The Washington Post. As a producer and narrator she takes on "Libretto for the Desert – Poetry Dedicated to the Victims of Genocide and War" a project that acknowledges the universality of loss, persecution, and intolerance. Poźniak received the 2019 Earphones Award for the best read audiobook Drive Your Plow Over the Bones of the Dead written by Nobel Prize Winner Olga Tokarczuk. In the video game world, she voiced Skarlet, the Blood Queen in Mortal Kombat 11. She also narrated documentaries such as, "The Officer's Wife" about the mass murder of Polish officers in the Katyn forest and co-narrated Freedom from Despair, a film about communism, which won several Awards and received an honorable mention in the US Congress. She narrated the 2020 novel Light in Hidden Places by Sharon Cameron, based on the true story of Stefania Podgorska, a Polish Catholic teenager who hid 13 Jewish persons during World War 2.

=== Theatre and performance art ===
Seeking a new voice for herself in a contemporary style that declares "anything is possible," she founded Theater Discordia. Creating performance-art pieces that have been part of the L.A. Theatre Festival, and the L.A. Poetry Festival, she directed and wrote "Poeticus Umbilicus", "Poetry Discordia", "Return of Umbilicus", "We & They" and "Changing Flags." Her Theater Discordia evolved, with the participation of Peter Sellars, into a celebrated venue for experimental theater works.

=== Visual Arts ===
Poźniak is also a painter, and continues to work in film, often appearing in experimental and independent productions, several of which she has also directed. In her directorial debut, which was a short film, "Mnemosyne", she used several art pieces made by herself. Praised by F.X. Feeney LA Weekly: "the multitalented Pozniak rapidly intercuts news footage of violence with live models and her own sensual sculptures to express a fierce moral sense." Through her art, Poźniak often explores what it is to be a woman in today's world with recurring themes of women's rights, social justice and women's history. Her artworks combine the choreographic traditions of theater with symbolic and surreal imagery of painting and sculpture. In her early mask series, Poźniak connects an ancient and mythological theatrical device with the surrealism of Man Ray to produce a stunning range of fantastical masks made from feathers and other found objects. Her more recent paintings and sculptures explore the collision of ancient myths and the modern world. By combining imagery reminiscent of surrealist dreamscapes with found objects, these works challenge our notions of continuity between past and present. Poźniak says: "Surrealism is a lens through which I view many of the events and circumstances occurring in the world today. Whether it is the horrors of war or inspirational insights found in ancient mythology, I am constantly exploring fantastical juxtapositions that express something about the experience of being a woman. That is why my paintings and sculptures are often surreal and full of symbolism. Feministic, poetical, and political."

== Charity and causes ==
Poźniak's art is often auctioned off for charity and support different causes including Children's Hospital and Looking Above & Beyond, an organization dedicated to creating awareness and the enrichment of children with special needs or Our House, an organization providing grief support services, education, resources, and hope. She also hosted Domestic Violence Prevention Awards, National Women's Political Caucus's - Women's Leadership Awards.

=== International Women's Day ===
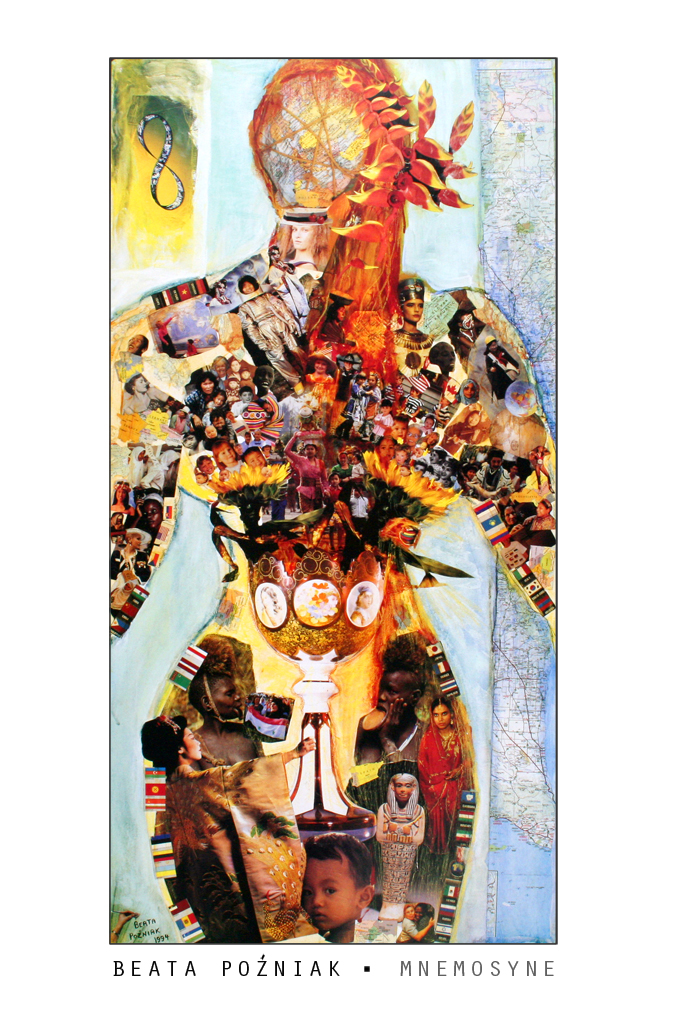
Mnemosyne - International Women's Day, painted by Beata

Beginning in the late 1980s, soon after her arrival in America, Poźniak began a campaign to get the US government to recognize International Women's Day. She was very successful, and on 8 March 1994, she accomplished the introduction of the first bill in the history of the U.S. Congress for national recognition of the holiday (H.J. Res. 316) designating 8 March as International Women's Day. She made the headlines of the Los Angeles Times, who hailed her as "Taking the Banner For Women Everywhere". Furthermore, Poźniak established an educational organization, Women's Day USA, which aims to raise public awareness of women's inspirational achievements all over the world. She also works on projects that help bring awareness to third world issues, with a special emphasis on the representation of women's voices and their untold stories.

She received official recognition from the Los Angeles City Council, which commended her for her efforts in establishing International Women's Day as a day to be celebrated in the United States and from Mayor Richard Riordan for her vision in creating International Women's Day, and from Mayor Tom Bradley for bringing the idea to Los Angeles. Poźniak has been acknowledged for her ability to work across both political parties in seeking greater recognition for women's rights. In 1995, at a public awards event, a women's rights attorney, Gloria Allred acknowledged Poźniak for her contributions to human rights and to women's history and also named Poźniak as being her personal hero.

In 1994, to commemorate the introduction of the bill recognizing International Women's Day, Poźniak created a painting "Mnemosyne - International Women's Day", the Mother of Memory, which celebrates the many contributions to human rights by women from all over the world. A symbol of International Women's Day, the work depicts a community of all races of the world in a female form. It evokes the achievements of women along their struggle for peace and equality in the face of discrimination and war.

== Awards and honors ==
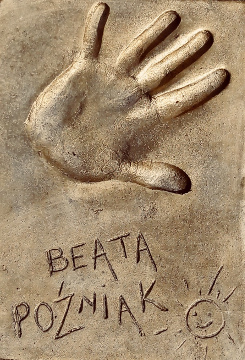
Bronze handprint at Festiwal Gwiazd

- Recognized by Congresswoman Maxine Waters for "bringing International Women's Day to the forefront and for initiating an official bill and for making this day a larger part of our nation's support of women here and around the world".
- Recognized by Senator Dianne Feinstein for seeing that "International Women's Day would not go by unnoticed" in the United States (1993)
- Presented and acknowledged by Councilwoman Jackie Goldberg for Poźniak's commitment for International Women's Day and creating Women's Day USA (1998)
- Awarded with a star, a bronze handprint at Festiwal Gwiazd, Poland's "Hollywood Walk of Fame." Past honorees include: Volker Schlöndorff, Peter Greenaway, David Lynch, Faye Dunaway, Ian Gillan, Anna Paquin among others (2017)
- Recognized by the Mayors of Los Angeles: Tom Bradley (1993) and Richard Riordan (1997) for her "vision in creating International Women's Day"
- Awarded a "Lifetime Achievement Award" - Presented by Osobowosci i Sukcesy Magazine (2018)
- Voice Arts Awards Nominee - "Outstanding Video Game Character - Best Voiceover" Category for Skarlet (voice) in Mortal Kombat 11 Warner Bros (2019)
- International Maria Konopnicka Prize – "For Outstanding Achievements in the Arts and for Championing Women's Rights Around the World". Presented at the GRAMMY LA Live (2019)
- The Ianicius Klemens Janicki Award – "For Artistic and Literary Achievements" (2019)
- Voice Arts Awards Nominee - "Outstanding Spoken Word or Storytelling - Best Performance" Category for "Libretto for the Desert: Poetry Dedicated to the Victims of Genocide and War" (2019)
- The Earphones Award Winner (2019) – for narrating Penguin Random House Drive Your Plow Over the Bones of the Dead, written by Nobel Prize winner, Olga Tokarczuk (2019)
- The Earphones Award Winner (2020) – for narrating "The Light in Hidden Places" audiobook for Scholastic (2020)
- Voice Arts Award nomination in the Outstanding Spoken Word or Storytelling - Best Performance Category - for "Tribute to Nobel Prize Winning Poet. Beata Pozniak at the HAMMER Museum Reads LIVE" (2020)
- Voice Arts Award nomination "Audiobook Narration – History – Best Voiceover" for The Light in Hidden Places by Sharon Cameron • Publisher: Scholastic Audio (2020).
- Voice Arts Award Winner, Outstanding Video Game Character, Best Voiceover Skarlet, Mortal Kombat 11 • Warner Bros. Games • NetherRealm Studio (2020)
- The Tadeusz Micinski Award "Feniks" for outstanding interpretation of poetry dedicated to victims of war. (2020)
- Poet of the Month - selected by Quarry Press
- The Modjeska Prize - For continuing the traditions and legacy of an extraordinary Polish immigrant who succeeded as a Shakespearean actress in the U.S. (2021)

== Filmography ==
List of acting credits in film and television
Year	Title	Role	Notes
2026	They'll Love It	Renata	Created and starred/series
2026	O co tu chodzi?	Becia	First world film based on verses of rap
2026	Wake Up	Sparky	Directed for Easterseals Film Challenge
2026	Picasso's Mermaid	Natalia	Based on a true story of Pablo Picasso
2021	Cremation of Time	Narrator	Written and Directed
2021	Libreto para el desierto	Narrator	Spanish language
2019	Mr. Jones	Rhea Clyman	Based on a true story of Gareth Jones
2018	Scenes in a Mind	Katrina Farnwald	Based on a true story
2016	All These Voices	Beata	Won, Student Academy Awards
2015	An Unknown Country	co-producer, documentary	Nominated, 2018 Emmy Award
2014	People on the Bridge	Wislawa Szymborska	Also directed
2010	The Officer's Wife	Officer's Wife (Cecylia)	Documentary, Narrator
2010	Ojciec Mateusz	Ewa Pol	Episode: "Spa"
2009	On Profiles in Courage	Host	Also directed
2007	Zlotopolscy	Helena	TV series (46 episodes)
2006	Cyxork 7	Jacey Anderson	Sci-Fi
2006	Miriam	Margritas	Based on a WW2 true story
2004	Freedom from Despair	Narrator	Won Croatian Heart Award together with Michael York, John Savage
2002	The Drew Carey Show	Raisa	Episode: "What Women Don't Want"
2002	Philly	Thomas Jury Forewoman	Episode: "Ripley, Believe It or Not"
2002	Mnemosyne	Mnemosyne	Also directed
2001	Family Law	Mary Kobish	Episode: "Obligations"
2001	Mixed Signals	Erica Chamberlain	played an artist
1999	The Adventures of Young Indiana Jones: Adventures in the Secret Service	Irene	Prod. George Lucas
1999	Enemy Action	Fatima	A Roger Corman action film
1999	Klasa na obcasach	Betty	TV series
1998	Women's Day: The Making of a Bill	Host	Doc. first International Women's Day US bill
1997	Pensacola: Wings of Gold	Eva Terenco	Episode: "Road Warriors"
1997	Babylon 5	President Susanna Luchenko	Episode: "Rising Star"
1997	Dark Skies	Ludmila	Episode: "Strangers in the Night"
1997	JAG	Malka Dayan	Episode: "Secrets"
1995	War & Love	Ingrid Steiner	aka "Heaven's Tears"
1995	A Mother's Gift	Kristine Reinmuller	Based on a western Bess Streeter Aldrich book
1993	Melrose Place	Dr. Katya Petrova Fielding	7 episodes
1993	Wild Palms	Tambor	ABC, 3 episodes
1993	The Young Indiana Jones Chronicles	Irene	"Petrograd, July 1917"
1993	Mad About You	Masha	Episode: "Maid About You"
1992	At Night the Sun Shines	Anabelle	Supervising prod. Robert Wise
1991	Ferdydurke	Flora Gente	Dir. Jerzy Skolimowski
1991	Ramona!	Ms. White	
1991	JFK	Marina Oswald	8 Nominations Oscars, 2 Wins
1989	Stan wewnętrzny	Woman in Black	plays the symbol of Solidarność
1989	White in Bad Light	Narrator	spiritual and shamanic journeys
1987	Vie en Images	Alicja Eber	Based on a true story
1986	A Chronicle of Amorous Accidents	Zosia	Dir. Andrzej Wajda
1985	Hamlet in the Middle of Nowhere	Ophelia	Inspired by William Shakespeare play
1985	Rozrywka po staropolsku	Córka	musical taking place in the Middle Ages
1984	Królowa śniegu Snow White	Princess	musical for National Polish TV
1984	Deszcz	Beata	music: Marek Grechuta Andrzej Szpilman
1993	Szczęśliwy brzeg	Pola	Played a girl that wants to be the first female sea Captain
1983	Życie Kamila Kuranta	Todzia	filming interrupted by Martial Law in Poland
1982	Kłamczucha	uczennica	Based on a teens novel
1981	Man of Iron	Solidarity Supporter	Dir. Andrzej Wajda
1980	Pierścień w świńskim ryju	Barbel	Based on a Thomas Mann story
1980	Tango ptaka	Karolinka	filmed while being in college
1979	The Tin Drum	Extra (uncredited)	Dir. Volker Schlöndorff

== Video games ==
List of video games
Year	Title	Character	Notes	
2026	Starfield: Terran Armada	Danica Volkov	Bethesda Games	
2025	Avowed	Mekla	Obsidian Entertainment	
2025	Klassic Skarlet	Skarlet (voice)	Mortal Kombat Mobile	
2022	Mortal Kombat: Onslaught	Skarlet (voice)	An action-adventure beat 'em up role-playing game	
2020	Mortal Kombat 11: Aftermath	Skarlet (voice)	Eleventh main game. Sequel to Mortal Kombat X	
2020	Mortal Kombat 11: Ultimate	Skarlet (voice)	2020 Voice Arts Awards Winner - "Outstanding Video Game Character - Best Voiceover"	Won
2019	Mortal Kombat 11	Skarlet (voice)	Warner Bros games - 2019 Voice Arts Awards Nominee - "Outstanding Video Game Character - Best Voiceover"	Nominated
1995	Psychic Detective	Laina Pozok	game screened as a feature at several film festivals, including Sundance Film Festival	

== Audiobooks and spoken word ==
List of audiobooks
Year	Title	Notes	Won?
2026	The Acrobat by Wislawa Szymborska Nobel Prize, Winner	Harper Collins	
2026	Świadek Schindlera by Beata Pozniak		
2026	PoezJA dyskordia by Beata Pozniak	Published by Austeria	
2025	The Neuroscientist Who Lost Her Mind by Barbara Lipska	Harper Collins	
2025	Songs from My Younger Years by January Pozniak	Polish language	
2024	Adopting an Abandoned Farm by Kate Sanborn	Voice Arts Award Nominee - Outstanding Audiobook Narration – Classics – Best Voiceover	Nominated
2024	Maybe This Time original by Audible	Audible's Best Listens of 2024	Won
2021	The Yellow Wallpaper by Charlotte Perkins Gilman		
2021	Libreto para el desierto	Spanish language	
2021	Libretto dla pustyni	Polish language	
2021	Bending Toward the Sun: a Mother Daughter Memoir, a true Holocaust story		
2021	Chwile zamyślenia ("Moments of Reflection") poetry	Polish language	
2020	Tribute to a Nobel Prize Winning Poet	Voice Arts Awards Nominee - "Outstanding Spoken Word or Storytelling - Best Performance"	Nominated
2020	A Wolf for a Spell, a Baba Yaga children's story, Random House		
2020	The Light in Hidden Places by Scholastic, a true story about the heroic Podgórski sisters	The 2020 Earphones Award Winner	Won
2020	Droga do nieba by Blackstone Publishing (Polish language)	The 2020 Feniks Award for Best Expressive Performance in an Audiobook	Won
2019	Drive Your Plow Over the Bones of the Dead - written by Nobel Prize winner Olga Tokarczuk - Penguin Random House	The 2019 Earphones Award Winner	Won
2019	Libretto for the Desert by Sona Van. Poems Dedicated to all the Victims of Genocide and War - Blackstone Audio	Voice Arts Awards Nominee - "Outstanding Spoken Word or Storytelling - Best Performance"	Nominated
2015	Illuminae (as Dr. Shteyngart) - Penguin Random House	Audie Award Winner	Won
2015	The Tsar of Love and Techno by Anthony Marra, Penguin Random House	The Washington Post "Best Audiobook of the Year"	Won
2014	Empress of the Night: A Novel of Catherine the Great (19-hour audiobook)	Random House	
2012	The Winter Palace: A Novel of Catherine the Great (19-hour audiobook)	Random House	
