= Psychic Detective (video game) =

1995 video game

- Developers: Colossal Pictures; Electronic Arts
- Publisher: Electronic Arts Studios
- Producers: Don Howe; Sally Bentley
- Designers: Jim Simmons; Michael Kaplan; John Sanborn
- Writer: Michael Kaplan
- Composer: Patrick Gleeson
- Platforms: MS-DOS, PlayStation, 3DO
- Release: DOS: NA: December 1995; EU: 1995; PlayStation: NA: April 4, 1996; EU: April 1996; 3DO: NA: 1996; EU: 1996
- Genre: Interactive movie
- Mode: Single-player

Psychic Detective is an interactive movie video game released in 1995 for MS-DOS and converted to PlayStation and 3DO. It was written by Michael Kaplan and directed by John Sanborn.

== Gameplay ==
Psychic Detective is generally presented in first person (except during cut scenes), with icons appearing at intervals on the screen signifying people and objects Eric can interact with. Each game generally takes about 45 minutes to play, however multiple plays are required in order to uncover all aspects of the storyline, and there are a dozen alternate endings possible; depending upon the choices made by the player, many different storylines are uncovered, including one that occurs if the player makes no choices and simply watches events unfold. Occasional cut scenes timed to occur at certain points break the storyline into chapters, but which cut scene is viewed depends upon Eric's actions. The endgame portion of Psychic Detective breaks from the linear narrative and involves Eric playing a surreal board game against the villain.

== Plot ==
The game is set in San Francisco where the player assumes the role of Eric Fox (Kevin Breznahan), a psychic who earns his living doing a magic act in a seedy nightclub. One night, he is approached by the exotic Laina Pozok (Beata Pozniak), who senses that Eric is more powerful than he imagines. She trains Eric to "hitch hike" into people's minds. He sees what his subject sees, and hears what his subject hears; meanwhile, his body continues to interact with the world around him in an "automatic pilot-like" state. Laina hires Eric to attend a wake being held in honor of her father, who has died under mysterious circumstances.

The game begins when Eric enters the Pozok household, and is given the choice to remain in his body, or hitch hike aboard any one of a number of characters he encounters. Eric also has the ability to pick up objects and take a psychic reading of them, providing more clues to help solve the Pozok murder case. Before long, Eric is embroiled in a conspiracy involving a powerful religious cult, spies, and family intrigue, and he also has to deal with his growing romantic attachment to Laina. Occasionally throughout the game, Eric obtains access to "psychic collectors" which amplify his abilities and allow him to affect the moods and attitudes of the people around him, but at a cost.

== Development ==
Psychic Detective was the brainchild of producer Jim Simmons, but the project ultimately involved nearly 200 people: 21 game developers at EA Studios, 80 film crew, and 95 actors.

The filming of the video sequences was handled by Colossal Pictures. The footage was shot on location in San Francisco and Oakland, California on twenty days over roughly six weeks.

According to John Sanborn, development took over two years: three months of brainstorming, six months of writing, and one year of editing and programming. The individual segments were edited in Adobe Premiere and authored in a proprietary Electronic Arts software.

== Release ==
The game was released on the PC, PlayStation and 3DO.

Live action footage from Psychic Detective was edited together to create a short film that was shown at a film festival in the mid-1990s.

== Reception ==
The game received mixed reviews on its first release. Arinn Dembo, writing for Computer Gaming World, gave the game 4 stars. GameSpot gave the PC version a 4.7, calling the game "innovative", but asserting that the overabundance of interaction and storyline branches turns the experience into a confusing mess. They concluded "Instead of being like a good movie enhanced by interactivity, Psychic Detective is a more like a movie... clouded with interactive options that eventually detract from the project."

GamePro gave the 3DO version a positive review, calling it "an entertaining interactive mystery game with an adult sensibility." They found the game an engaging challenge due to the need to be head-hopping in the right person at the right time and listen carefully to the complex dialogue, and praised the sharpness of the full-motion video graphics.

Reviewing the PlayStation version in Maximum, David Hodgson complimented the uniqueness of the "more 'adult' storyline", but contended that full-motion video-based games are not worth playing regardless of gameplay or content. He scored it 2 out of 5 stars. GamePro, while warning that the game is strictly for older players, praised it for having a good murder mystery, "Clean full-motion video (although mostly in a small-screen format), great sound, and more fun than Snowjob. (Note: Snow Job (consistently misspelled in GamePro as a single word) was a contemporaneous release for the 3DO Interactive Multiplayer which also uses extensive live action full motion video with a mystery storyline.)"
