= Stalin: An Appraisal of the Man and His Influence =

Biography of Josef Stalin by Leon Trotsky

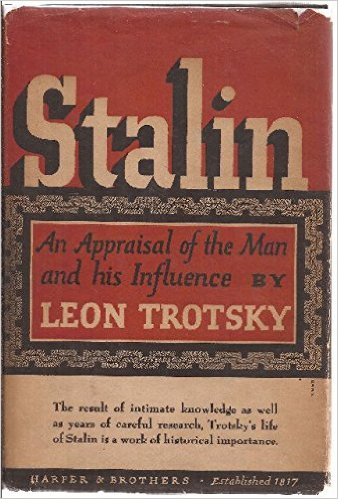
- Author: Leon Trotsky
- Publication date: 1946

Stalin: An Appraisal of the Man and His Influence is a political biography of Joseph Stalin, written by Leon Trotsky between 1938 and 1940. The book was never finished due to Trotsky's assassination in August 1940, although copious draft manuscripts for concluding chapters survived, allowing editors to complete the work.

The Russian manuscript was translated and edited by language professor and Trotskyist political sympathizer Charles Malamuth. Originally scheduled for publication in the second half of 1941, the book was printed but then abruptly withdrawn from distribution for political reasons due to American entry into World War II. The book finally was released in 1946 when the political relationship between the United States and Soviet Union became frosty. It was subsequently published in French and Spanish in 1948, and in Russian in 1985.

In 2016, an authorized revised second edition was published. British writer Alan Woods deconstructed the original manuscript and reassembled the pieces in as comprehensive a manner as possible, resulting in the addition of 100,000 words. An American edition of the lengthy tome was published in 2019.

== Background ==
On February 15, 1938, New York publisher Harper & Brothers approached émigré communist political leader Leon Trotsky to write a biography of his arch-nemesis, General Secretary of the Communist Party of the Soviet Union Joseph Stalin. The proposal called for a payment of $5,000 for the book, with the advance to be paid to the author in installments. Facing financial difficulties which could be obviated by a lucrative contract with a commercial publisher, Trotsky accepted the Harper proposal.

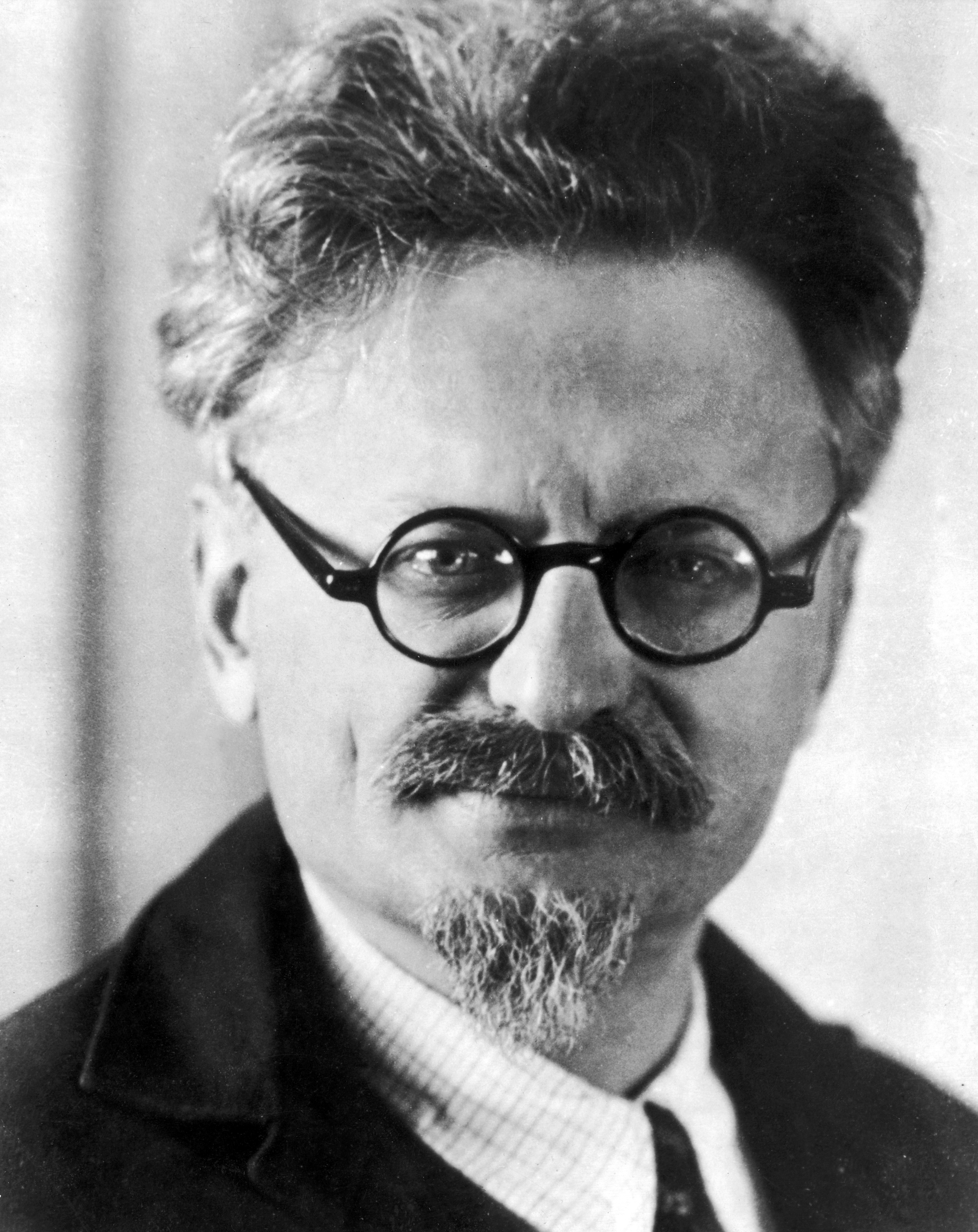
Leon Trotsky as he appeared during the 1930s.

As Trotsky intended to write the book in his native Russian, a translator was necessary; Charles Malamuth, an assistant professor of language at the University of California, Berkeley, a former correspondent for United Press International in the Soviet Union was available for the task and was hired by the publisher with Trotsky's approval.

Exposed to the Trotskyist movement through his experience as a foreign correspondent in 1931, Malamuth considered himself a convinced admirer of Trotsky and his disciples, although he was never himself a member of a Trotskyist political party.

Trotsky began work on the manuscript in April 1938, with the first chapter completed and mailed to translator Malamuth on July 7. The second chapter was completed and mailed on August 16 and a third on September 12. However, Trotsky was interrupted by other tasks and the project hit a lull. Owing to the slow pace of writing, Harper & Brothers shut down payment of additional advances on the manuscript before the close of 1938.

Trotsky also began to quarrel with the translator, taking issue with the quality of his translation, becoming angered by what he considered a breach of trust when Malamuth passed along copies of the manuscript to others, and finding Malamuth to be "tremendously pretentious" in his bearing.

Work on the book continued through 1939, despite regular interruptions. By May 1940 the work was finished through the revolutionary year of 1917, with the second half of the book remaining a patchwork of partially completed manuscripts. A first assassination attempt by Soviet agents brought work to an abrupt halt, as Trotsky focused upon the ongoing legal investigation of the affair and fought off an avalanche of verbal attacks in the Mexican press. A second assassination attempt on August 20, 1940, proved successful and Trotsky died with the manuscript uncompleted.

Following Trotsky's death, publisher Harper & Brothers, who retained rights to the book, placed translator Malamuth in charge of rendering the fragmentary second half of the book fit for publication. He gained possession of the manuscript and began making decisions on his sole authority as to what to include or exclude from the final publication. Segue material was written in the form of commentaries. Hundreds of lines were added from Malamuth's own pen, with one comparison of the original manuscript to the published version showing that an incredible 62% of chapter 11 originated with the erstwhile translator.

Malamuth's commentary and silent insertions of content, some of which stood in contradiction to Trotsky's own views, drew a vehement rebuke from Natalia Sedova, Trotsky's widow. Sedova charged that "unheard-of violence" had been "committed by the translator on the author's rights" and declared that "everything written by the pen of Mr. Malamuth must be expunged from the book." This was not to be, however, and the Malamuth commentaries remained in the published book despite a failed effort by Sedova to win an injunction against publication in court.

== Publication ==
Publication of Stalin was initially planned by Harper & Brothers for the second half of 1941. Even as the book was being printed for distribution, however, the US government intervened with the publisher to halt publication, anxious to remain in good graces with Joseph Stalin in the aftermath of the Nazi invasion of the Soviet Union. Already shipped to some distributors, the book was abruptly withdrawn from public sale.

George Orwell wrote the following in Tribune on December 1, 1944:

"The book had been printed and—this is the point that I have been waiting to verify before mentioning this matter in my notes—the review copies had been sent out when the USA entered the war. The book was immediately withdrawn, and the reviewers were asked to cooperate in ‘avoiding any comment whatever regarding the biography and its postponement’.

"They have cooperated remarkably well. The affair has gone almost unmentioned in the American press and, as far as I know, entirely unmentioned in the British press, although the facts were well known and obviously worth a paragraph or two.

"Since the American entry into the war made the USA and the USSR allies, I think that to withdraw the book was an understandable if not particularly admirable deed. What is disgusting is the general willingness to suppress all mention of it. A little while back I attended a meeting of the PEN Club, which was held to celebrate the tercentenary of Areopagitica, Milton’s famous tract on the freedom of the press. There were countless speeches emphasizing the importance of preserving intellectual liberty, even in war-time. If I remember rightly, Milton’s phrase about the special sin of ‘murdering’ a book was printed on the PEN leaflet for the occasion. But I heard no reference to this particular murder, the facts of which were no doubt known to plenty of people there."

Full release was deferred until after the conclusion of World War II and the falling out of relations between the United States and its wartime Soviet ally. The book's release in 1946 drew an enraged response from the pro-communist press, which took particular umbrage at Trotsky's unsubstantiated and outrageous charge that Stalin had poisoned Russian revolutionary leader V. I. Ulyanov (Lenin).

An editor of the revised second edition of the book noted in 2016:

"Five years after it had been withdrawn to avoid embarrassment to Stalin, the book was now seen as a useful stick with which to beat him. Malamuth's insertions provided the necessary 'adjustments' to turn Trotsky's work into a weapon in the struggle not only against Stalinism but also against Bolshevism. For their part, Harper & Brothers were keen to make money from its delayed publication. The whole episode is characterized by the most blatant cynicism on all sides: the publishers, Malamuth, and the US government all conspired to use and abuse this book for their own ends. The one voice that was silenced was that of the author, Leon Trotsky."

== Summary ==
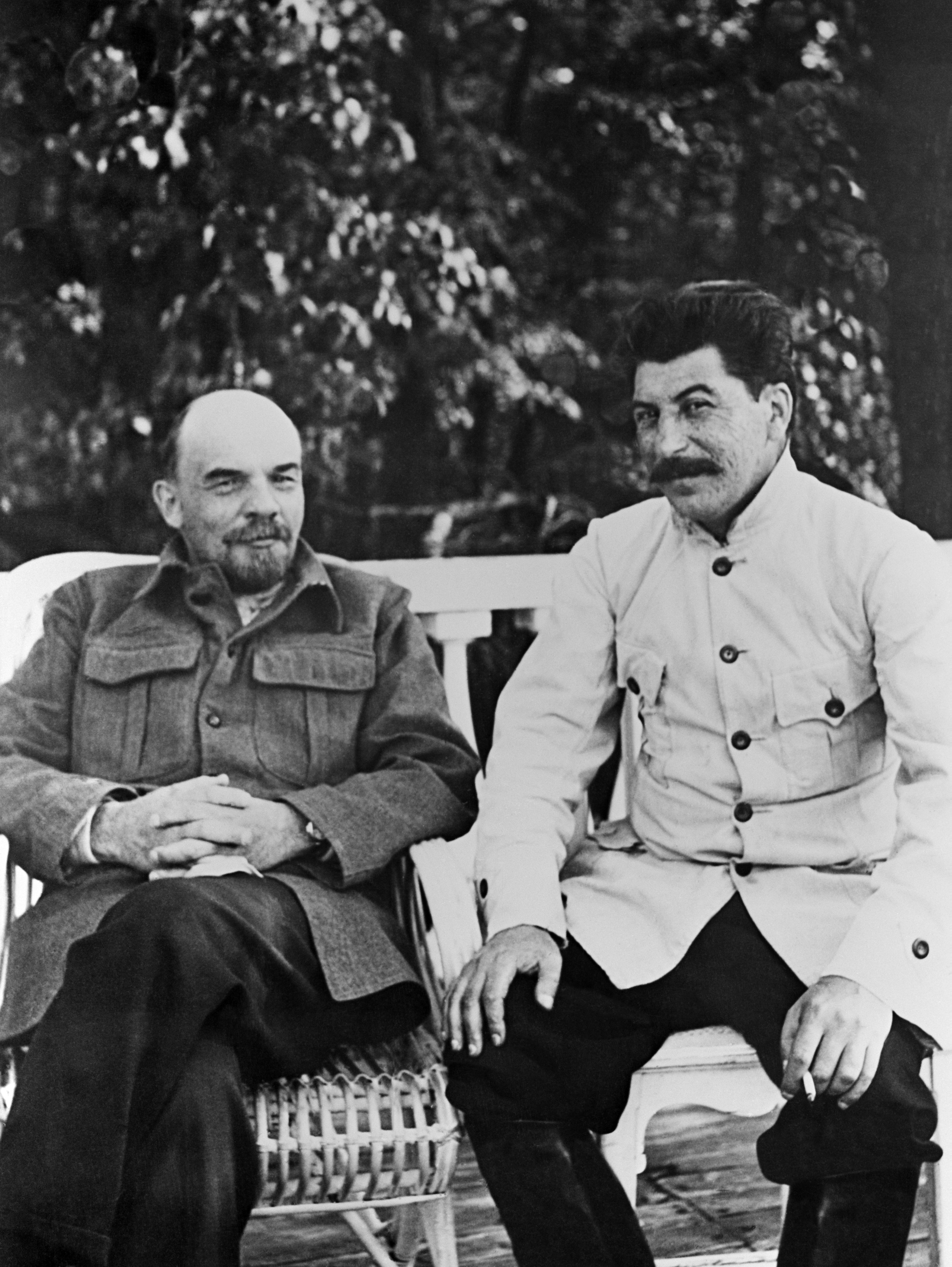
Trotsky controversially suggested that Stalin had poisoned V.I. Lenin, seen here with Stalin recuperating from a stroke in the city of Gorky.

Stalin begins with an unfinished introduction where Trotsky attempts to prove his objectivity in relation to the events in the rest of the book, however was never finished due to his assassination. Trotsky spends the first chapter discussing Stalin's childhood, where he describes the young Stalin as a child who hates authority and whose "hostility was reserved, underhanded, watchful".

Trotsky spends the next few chapters discussing Stalin's increasing role in revolutionary activities with the likes of Vladimir Lenin and Trotsky himself. Many of the revolutionary activities Stalin participated in during the early years of his life were against the Tsarist regime, who ruled Russia at the time. Trotsky is quick to point out the difference between Lenin and Stalin, saying of Lenin, "The idea of making a fetish of the political machine was not only alien but repugnant to his nature." Trotsky contrasts this sentiment of Lenin with a critique of Stalin, saying of him, "His thinking is too slow, his associations too single-tracked, his style too plodding and barren."

After a couple of more chapters about Stalin's continued participation in anti-Tsarist movements and increasing popularity among revolutionaries, the section is left unfinished due to Trotsky's murder, only to resume during the period in which Lenin is approaching his death.

Trotsky describes the years leading up to Lenin's death as being full of tension and internal conflict among those in the Communist Party of the Soviet Union. Trotsky makes clear throughout the final chapter of the book that Lenin feared Stalin taking control of the Soviet Union after his death. Trotsky posits that Stalin may have been at fault for the poisoning of Lenin that ultimately led to his death and claims the events he outlines in the chapter "were known to no more than seven or eight persons" and that "of that number, besides myself, only Stalin and Molotov are still among the living." With regard to Lenin's successor, Trotsky credits Lenin for saying, "I propose to the comrades to find a way to remove Stalin from that position and appoint to it another man," who would be, "more loyal, more courteous and more considerate to comrades, less capricious, etc.".

Finally, Trotsky gives his account of the events surrounding Lenin's funeral, for which he was criticized for not being present:

According to a widely disseminated version, I lost power because I was not present at Lenin's funeral. This explanation can hardly be taken seriously. But the fact of my absence at the mourning ceremonies caused many of my friends serious misgivings. In the letter from my oldest son, who was then nearing eighteen, there was a note of youthful despair: I should have come at any price!

Trotsky accuses Stalin of scheduling the funeral in a way to prevent Trotsky from being able to attend:

Stalin maneuvered, deceiving not only me but, so it appears, also his allies of the triumvirate. Stalin was guided in his risky maneuvers by more tangible considerations. He might have feared that I would connect Lenin's death with last year's conversation about poison, would ask the doctors whether poisoning was involved, and demand a special autopsy. It was, therefore, safer in all respects to keep me away until after the body had been embalmed, the viscera cremated and a post mortem examination inspired by such suspicions no longer feasible.

Trotsky's chronology ends with Stalin reading his "oath of fealty" over the bier of Lenin, which Trotsky describes as having "now superseded the Ten Commandments".

== Reception ==
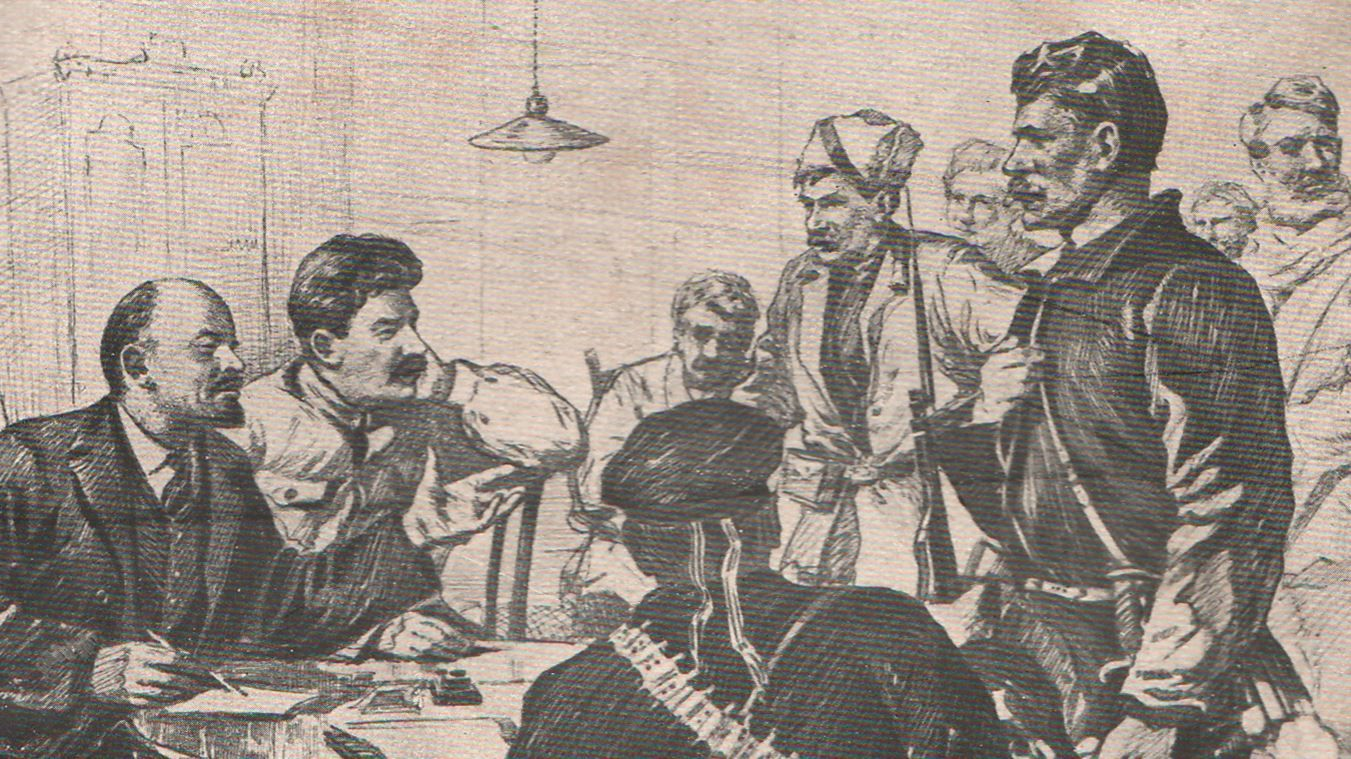
Sketch featured in the New York Times article on Stalin by Trotsky. Vasiliev. Stalin and Lenin in 1917

On April 28, 1946, a New York Times article about the release of Trotsky's book was published. The article provides a thorough summary of the book and offers background information about Trotsky and his assassination. The article mentions the significance of the book during the time:

"It now is made available to the public at a moment when the man it attempts to appraise is at the height of his power and influence."

The article also makes note of the editing that had to be done to the book as a result of Trotsky's death, resulting in the majority of the book to be about Stalin's youth rather than his time in power:

The rest was compiled by the editor from "largely raw material," with extensive interpolations of his own. The inevitable result is a certain lack of balance. Stalin's earlier years (up to 1917) have received a much fuller and more systematic treatment than his activities since the establishment of the Soviet regime in Russia. Admirable as Mr. Malamuth's editorial work has been, the later part of the book, dealing with the crucial problem of Stalin's rise to power, has remained rather sketchy and leaves some important points insufficiently developed.

In July of the same year, John G. Wright described Malamuth's role in translating the book as "scandalous", noting that his editing of the book ran counter to Trotsky's own intentions.

== Later editions ==
In 1948 an edition of Stalin was published in French, edited by Jean van Heijenoort, a former secretary of Trotsky's, in conjunction with Trotsky's friend Alfred Rosmer. Although believed by some to be a more authentic rendition of Trotsky's words, a subsequent comparison of the published French edition to Trotsky's original manuscript revealed the deletion of many pages of Trotsky's own writing, the addition of little of import, and a blurring of Malamuth's commentary with the words of Trotsky through the editorial removal of square brackets from the English edition.

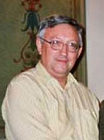
Alan Woods, editor of the second English edition of Stalin.

A Spanish edition also appeared in 1948, based upon the English edition but containing a warning to readers by Natalia Sedova about the editorial changes to the book's content and meaning made by Malamuth. This Spanish edition was republished in Argentina in 1975.

The first Russian edition, edited by Yuri Felshtinsky, was not published until 1985. This two-volume version went back to the original Trotsky manuscript, now housed at Harvard University, and added substantial new content, while deleting a great deal of content previously published in the English edition of the book. This Russian edition aggressively restructured the form of the book, changing the order of paragraphs to enhance readability.

A new English edition saw print in 2016, edited by Alan Woods. This new version followed Felshtinsky's example of restructuring paragraph order, taking the manuscript to pieces and then reassembling it with the addition of all new material at the editor's disposal. Declaring Malamuth's translation to have been "not at all bad," Woods removed all content originating from Malamuth's pen and replaced it, where necessary, with new bridging text of his own — segue material which did not attempt to impose the original ideas of the translator upon the manuscript, as had Malamuth.

In this revised English translation, the decision was made not to interfere with the content of the first part of the book, Chapters 1 through 7, which had been translated for and approved by Trotsky during his life. The second half of the book, however, was radically restructured, with old Chapters 8 through 12 becoming new Chapters 8 through 14 — a change which added 86,000 words to the 106,000 word length of the original.

Editor Woods noted:

If Trotsky had lived, it is very clear that he would have produced an infinitely better work. He would have made a rigorous selection of the raw material. Like an accomplished sculptor he would have polished it and then polished it again, until it reached the dazzling heights of a work of art. We cannot hope to attain such heights. We do not know what material the great man would have selected or rejected. But we feel we are under a historic obligation at least to make available to the world all the material that is available to us."

This revised second edition, approved by the estate of Leon Trotsky, was published in the United Kingdom by Wellred Books in 2016, with an American edition in hardcover and paperback published by Haymarket Books in 2019.

== See also ==
- The Stalin School of Falsification
- Leon Trotsky bibliography
