= Petar Cvirn =

Croatian actor (born 1986)

- Born: Zagreb, SFR Yugoslavia (present-day Croatia)
- Occupation: Actor
- Years active: 2002–present

Petar Cvirn (born 1 September 1986 in Zagreb) is a Croatian international actor.

== History ==
Cvirn first started acting at the age of 10 in a partner theatre of the Croatian National Theatre. Cvirn has been chosen since elementary school to play lead roles in 14 different plays and works such as Cinderella, and as the Greek God Apollo in The Fury of the Gods. He debuted on the big screen as a 13-year-old in the film God Forbid a Worse Thing Should Happen by Snježana Tribuson. Freedom from Despair was his next film.

== Filmography ==
=== Television roles ===
- Ruza vjetrova as Filip (2011)
- Dolina sunca as Lovro Bukovac (2009–2010)

=== Film roles ===
- Half an Hour for Granny (2010)
- Sleep Sweet, My Darling (2005)
- Freedom from Despair (2004)
- God Forbid a Worse Thing Should Happen (2002)
