= Freedom from Despair =

- A young man's journey from despair, a nation's struggle for freedom.
- Directed by: Brenda Brkusic
- Written by: Brenda Brkusic
- Produced by: Brenda Brkusic
- Music by: Nenad Bach
- Release date: 2004
- Running time: 95 minutes
- Country: United States
- Languages: English, Croatian

Freedom from Despair is a 2004 documentary by Croatian-American director Brenda Brkusic about the Croatian struggle against communism in Yugoslavia.

The film was narrated by John Savage. Voiceovers were provided by actors Michael York and Beata Pozniak. Among those interviewed for the film were U.S. congressmen George Radanovich and Dennis Kucinich, both of Croatian background. The Croatian actor Petar Cvirn is also in this movie.

The film won awards for best documentary at the New York International Independent Film and Video Festival and the International Student Film Festival Hollywood, as well as Viewer's Voice Award at the Cinequest Film Festival.
