= Charles Malamuth =

American journalist, writer, translator and anticommunist

- Born: 9 November 1899; Łódź, Piotrków Governorate, Congress Poland
- Died: 14 July 1965 (aged 65); Los Angeles, California, United States
- Occupation: Translator
- Spouses: Joan London (m. 1925–1935): Renee Malamuth

Charles Malamuth (9 November 1899 – 14 July 1965) was an American journalist, writer, translator from Russian and anticommunist. He is best known over the years as translator of Stalin: An Appraisal of the Man and His Influence by Leon Trotsky (1941) for which Soviet communists attacked him as a Trotskyite in the 1940s and Trotskyists attacked him as an anticommunist in the 2010s.

== Life ==
Charles Leo Malamuth (or Goodman) was born on 9 November 1899, in Łódź, Poland (then part of the Russian Empire). His father was Leo Goodman and his mother Cipa (also Celia) Broder.

In the 1920s, Malamuth was a professor in the Slavonic Department at the University of California, Berkeley.

On 20 December 1925, in Sacramento, California, Malamuth married Joan London, daughter of American novelist and socialist Jack London. It was her second marriage. They divorced in 1930, moved to Moscow, remarried, separated in 1934, and divorced for good in 1935. By 1950, he was again married to Renee Malamuth.

He corresponded with Max Eastman, Eugene Lyons, Adolphe Menjou, and Leon Trotsky as well as Ilya Ehrenburg, Anatoly Lunacharsky, Aleksei Tolstoi, and Evgeny Zamyatin. Other friends and acquaintances included Isaac Don Levine. Malamuth served as assistant to Eugene Lyons during the latter's stay there as Moscow bureau chief for United Press. On 22 November 1930, he accompanied Lyons to an historic interview with Joseph Stalin.

In 1947, he was director of European Public Relations in Paris for the American Jewish Joint Distribution Committee. Around 1950, he left Paris to join Radio Free Europe in Frankfurt, Voice of America, and Radio Liberty.

In 1953, the Communist Party of France attacked him in its newspaper Ce soir by calling him "un fidéle de Trotsky" (transl. a Trotsky loyalist) and citing his and Lyons support for Victor Kravchenko during the latter's trial in France for his book I Chose Freedom (1949), which exposed the GULAG system in the USSR. Ce Soir "accused" Malamuth of translating the first 500 pages of Kravchenko's famous book. Furthermore, the newspaper accused Malamuth of close association with the "Trotskyite" Max Eastman and with Isaac Don Levine. In addition, his visitors in Paris included ex-CP members Jay Lovestone and Benjamin Gitlow, and he was also known to have visited the US Embassy in Paris weekly (i.e., implying that he was an American spy). Lastly, he had worked for the American Joint Distribution Committee ("Jewish welfare agency"), which the CPSU had accused of "engineering" the alleged Doctors Plot, which was based on false accusations.

He died in Los Angeles on 14 July 1965.

== Legacy: Trotsky's Stalin (2016) ==
While Stalinist communist parties called Malamuth a Trotskyist, Trotskyists considered him an anticommunist – and still do to this day.

In 2016, Wellred Books published a new translation of Trotsky's biography Stalin by Alan Woods. For this new translation, Woods consulted not only Harvard University library archives (which holds Trotsky's papers for the book) but also French and Russian translations. It contains 100,000 words more than Malamuth's 1940 translation. Also, the new translation presents the book with "Malamuth's political distortions removed."

Robert Sewell of In Defense of Marxism has strongly criticized Malamuth. He has written, "Whatever Malamuth's talents, this was a political task for which he was completely unsuited." Trotsky was unhappy with Malamuth because he had shown his unfinished translations to others (specifically Max Shachtman and James Burnham). For this indiscretion, Trotsky blamed him further: "He does not know Russian; he does not know English; and he is tremendously pretentious."

In video, Sewell explained about Malamuth:

Clearly, he wasn't in the political state in order the carry out his particular task. He wasn't qualified enough to carry out this particular task. Therefore, he introduced into this later edited version a lot of material that he had decided to supplement to Trotsky's work. These supplements, these additions clearly went against the general thrust of Trotsky's political thought... Natalia Trotsky... wanted to take out the material that had been put in by Malamuth, that should be replaced by Trotsky's own writing... Malamuth had given the excuse that a lot of it was repetition... The main thing also he said that the transcripts had been damaged in the assassination attack in 1940, and some of the material was in disrepair... There wasn't any damage whatsoever... and files deliberately left out of the book... A vast number of words had been left out... an extra 100,000 words. Malamuth's text of about 10,000 were taken out.

Ultimately, Sewell conceded a simpler explanation: "Following Trotsky's death, the American publishers (Harper and Brothers), who owned the rights to the book, placed Malamuth in charge, not only of the translation, but of 'editing' the final book. For them, this was simply a commercial calculation to salvage the book following the author's death." In other words, "Trotsky's views did not enter into their calculations."

Given Malamuth's career, Sewell's assessment – that the translation of Trotsky's Stalin was "a political task for which he was completely unsuited" – signaled to fellow Trotskyists that Malamuth was an anticommunist.

== Translations ==
- Squaring the Circle by Valentine Katayev (1928, 1935)
- The Volga Falls to the Caspian Sea by Boris Pilnyak (New York: Farrar and Rinehart, 1931)
- The Little Golden Calf by Evgeny Petrov (New York: Farrar and Rinehart, 1932)
- Chocolate by Alexander Tarasov-Rodionov (New York: Doubleday, Doran & Company, Inc., 1932)
- Forward, O Time! by Valentine Katayev (New York: Holt, Rinehart and Winston, 1933)
- Forward, O Time! by Valentine Katayev (New York: Farrar and Rinehart, 1934)
- Fear by Alexander Afinogenov (1934)
- Inga by Anatole Glebov (1934)
- Little Golden America by Evgeny Petrov (1936)
- Lonely White Sail, or Peace is Where the Tempests Blow by Valentine Katayev (New York: Farrar and Rinehart, 1936)
- Stalin: An Appraisal of the Man and His Influence by Leon Trotsky (1941)

== See also ==
- Joan London
- Leon Trotsky
- Eugene Lyons
- Victor Kravchenko
- Max Eastman
- American Jewish Joint Distribution Committee
