= Walter Duranty =

Anglo-American journalist (1884–1957)

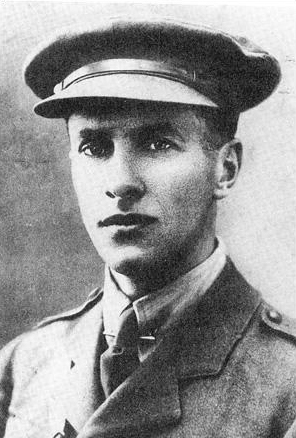
- 1919 photo
- Born: 25 May 1884; Liverpool, England
- Died: 3 October 1957 (aged 73); Orlando, Florida, U.S.
- Education: Emmanuel College, Cambridge
- Occupation: Journalist

Walter Duranty (25 May 1884 – 3 October 1957) was an Anglo-American journalist who served as Moscow bureau chief of The New York Times for fourteen years (1922–1936) following the Bolshevik victory in the Russian Civil War (1917–1923).

Though Duranty was widely regarded in his day, and received the 1932 Pulitzer Prize for his "profound and intimate comprehension of conditions in Russia," he was later criticized for repeating Soviet propaganda and downplaying the horrors of Stalinism. In particular, beginning in 1990 there were calls for the Pulitzer Board to revoke Duranty's prize for his coverage of the Soviet famine of 1930–1933. The board declined to revoke the award and in 2003 said the articles which it examined in making the award did not contain "clear and convincing evidence of deliberate deception".

== Early life and career ==
Duranty was born in a middle-class Lancashire family to Emmeline (née Hutchins) and William Steel Duranty. His grandparents had moved to Birkenhead, on the Wirral Peninsula in Cheshire, from the West Indies in 1842 and established a successful merchant business in which his father worked. He studied at Harrow, one of Britain's most prestigious public schools, but a sudden collapse in the family business led to a transfer as a day boy to Bedford School in 1899. He gained a scholarship in 1903 to study at Emmanuel College, Cambridge, where he graduated with a first-class degree.

After completing his education, Duranty moved to Paris, where he met Aleister Crowley and participated in magic rituals with him. Duranty became involved in a relationship with Crowley's mistress, Jane Cheron, and eventually married her.

In Magick Without Tears, Crowley terms Duranty "my old friend" and quotes from Duranty's book, I Write as I Please.

During World War I, Duranty worked as a reporter for The New York Times. A story Duranty filed about the Paris Peace Conference of 1919 gained him wider notice as a journalist. He moved to Riga, Latvia, to cover events in the newly independent Baltic states.

== Career in Moscow ==
Duranty moved to Soviet Russia in 1921. On holiday in France in 1924, his left leg was injured in a train wreck. After an operation, the surgeon discovered gangrene and amputated the leg. Once he had recovered, Duranty returned to the Soviet Union.

During the New Economic Policy, which implemented a mixed economy, Duranty's articles failed to draw widespread attention. After the advent of the first five-year plan (1928–1933), which aimed to transform Soviet industry and agriculture, he was granted an exclusive interview with Joseph Stalin that greatly enhanced his reputation as a journalist. Duranty remained in Moscow for 12 years.

=== Views on the Soviet Union ===
In the 1931 series of news reports for which he received the 1932 Pulitzer Prize for Correspondence, Duranty argued that the Russian people were "Asiatic", requiring autocratic government. Failed attempts since the time of Peter the Great to apply Western ideals in Russia were a form of European colonialism, he wrote, that had been finally swept away by the 1917 Revolution. Duranty described the Soviet Union after the 1917 Revolution as somewhat realizing the ideas of Karl Marx: "Marx theorized about 'the elimination of class distinctions' in his proletarian Utopia, but Leninism and Stalinism showed what the words meant in practice."

By 1931, Duranty argued that the Soviets believed Vladimir Lenin and his New Economic Policy were failures tainted by Western thought. Duranty wrote that, "Where Marxism theorized, Stalin acts. Marxism says, “Eliminate class distinctions” and Stalinism does so by the simple and effective process of destructions....". Whereas Duranty wrote that the kulaks under Leninism were "an almost privileged class, encouraged to work and prosper", he described the "liquidation of the kulaks" under Stalin as an example of that utter elimination of class distinctions.

Duranty argued that Stalin succeeded where Lenin had failed: he "re-established a dictator of the imperial idea and put himself in charge" through intimidation. "Stalin didn't look upon himself as a dictator, but as a 'guardian of the sacred flame' that he called Stalinism for want of a better name." Stalin's five-year plan was an attempt to effect a new way of life for the Russian people, according to Duranty's reports for The New York Times.

Duranty both admitted the Stalinist system's brutality and defended its necessity. He claimed that individuals being sent to the labor camps in the Russian North, Siberia, or Kazakhstan, sometimes with their families, might later, eventually, be given a choice between rejoining Soviet society or becoming underprivileged outsiders. However, he admitted that for those who could not accept the system, "the final fate of such enemies is death". He acknowledged that the brutal collectivization campaign and exile to work camps in Siberia offered "no more than a hope or promise of a subsequent raising up. Perhaps this hope, is vain and the promise a lie. That is a secret of the future." Though describing the system as cruel, he stated that he had "no brief for or against it, nor any purpose save to try to tell the truth".

Since his death, Duranty's reporting has been faulted for being uncritical of the USSR and presenting Soviet propaganda as legitimate.

In his praise of Stalin as an imperial, national, "authentically Russian" dictator to be compared to Ivan the Terrible, Duranty was expressing views similar to those of some White (Russian) émigrés during the same period, namely the Smenovekhovtsy movement, echoing still earlier hopes by the Eurasianism movement and the Mladorossi group currents in the 1920s. (Stalin was not Russian, but Georgian, with possible distant Ossetian ancestry – his paternal great-grandfather was possibly an Ossetian – a fact that he downplayed during his lifetime.)

In a 1933 meeting with Duranty, Stalin praised the newsman for trying his best "to tell the truth about our country".

=== Reporting the 1932–1933 famine ===
Following a number of reports in Western newspapers about a growing famine in southern Russia and Ukraine, Duranty expressed skepticism in a March 31, 1933 article titled "Russians Hungry, But Not Starving":

In the middle of the diplomatic duel between Great Britain and the Soviet Union over the accused British engineers, there appears from a British source a big scare story in the American press about famine in the Soviet Union, with "thousands already dead and millions menaced by death from starvation".

The "diplomatic duel" was a reference to the arrest of engineers from the Metropolitan-Vickers company who were working in the USSR. Accused along with Soviet citizens of "wrecking" (sabotaging) the plant they were building, they were the subjects of one in a series of show trials presided over by Andrey Vyshinsky during the First Five Year Plan.

In particular, Duranty took aim at claims of a famine by Welsh journalist Gareth Jones, who had recently travelled through some of the areas worst-hit by the famine. Duranty said Jones had based his conclusion on a handful of villages, and there was no evidence of "actual starvation or deaths from starvation, but there is widespread mortality from diseases due to malnutrition."

Five months later (23 August 1933), in another New York Times article, Duranty wrote:

Any report of a famine in Russia is today an exaggeration or malignant propaganda. The food shortage, however, which has affected the whole population in the last year and particularly in the grain-producing provinces – the Ukraine, North Caucasus [i.e. Kuban Region], and the Lower Volga – has, however, caused heavy loss of life.

Duranty concluded, "it is conservative to suppose" that, in certain provinces with a total population of over 40 million, mortality had "at least trebled."

== Later career ==
Following sensitive negotiations in November 1933 that resulted in the establishment of relations between the U.S. and the U.S.S.R., a dinner was given for Soviet Foreign Minister Maxim Litvinov in New York City's Waldorf-Astoria Hotel. Each of the attendees' names was read in turn, politely applauded by the guests, until Duranty's. Whereupon, Alexander Woollcott wrote, "the one really prolonged pandemonium was evoked ... Indeed, one quite got the impression that America, in a spasm of discernment, was recognizing both Russia and Walter Duranty."

Sally J. Taylor, author of the critical Duranty biography Stalin's Apologist, argues that his reporting from the USSR was a key factor in U.S. President Franklin D. Roosevelt's 1933 decision to grant official recognition to the Soviet Union.

After settling in the United States in 1934, Duranty was placed on retainer with the New York Times, the terms of which required him to spend several months a year in Moscow. In this capacity, he reported on the show trials of Stalin's political opponents in 1936–1938.

He wrote several books on the Soviet Union after 1940. His name was on a list maintained by writer George Orwell of those Orwell considered to be unsuitable as possible writers for the British Foreign Office's Information Research Department, owing to the possibility of them being too sympathetic to communism or possibly paid communist agents.

== Death ==
Duranty died in 1957 in Orlando, Florida, aged 73.

== Scholarship on Duranty's work ==
=== The Soviet Famine (1932–1933) and the 1938 Moscow Show Trials ===
Duranty has been criticized for repeating Stalin and the Soviet Union's official propaganda rather than reporting news, both when he was living in Moscow and later. For example, he later defended Stalin's Moscow Trials of 1938, which were staged to eliminate potential challengers to Stalin's authority.

The major controversy regarding his work remains his reporting on the great famine of 1930–33 that struck certain parts of the USSR after agriculture was forcibly and rapidly "collectivised". In Ukraine, one of the regions most affected, this disaster is today known as the Holodomor.

In his articles, Duranty repeatedly denied that there was a famine, though he allowed there was "widespread mortality from diseases due to malnutrition." In private, he reportedly acknowledged a famine was underway, estimating tens of millions may have died as a result. Duranty often dismissed atrocities in the Soviet Union, saying "to put it brutally—you can't make an omelette without breaking eggs."

Since the late 1960s, Duranty's work has come increasingly under fire for failing to adequately report the famine. Robert Conquest was critical of Duranty's reporting in The Great Terror (1968), The Harvest of Sorrow (1986) and, most recently, in Reflections on a Ravaged Century (1990). Joseph Alsop and Andrew Stuttaford spoke out against Duranty during the Pulitzer Prize controversy. "Lying was Duranty's stock in trade," commented Alsop. In his memoirs, British journalist Malcolm Muggeridge, then The Manchester Guardian's correspondent in Moscow, talked of Duranty's "persistent lying" and elsewhere called him "the greatest liar I ever knew".

=== What Duranty knew and when ===
It was clear, meanwhile, from Duranty's comments to others that he was fully aware of the scale of the calamity. In 1934, he privately reported to the British embassy in Moscow that as many as 10 million people might have died, directly or indirectly, from famine in the Soviet Union in the previous year.

Both British intelligence and American engineer Zara Witkin, who worked in the USSR from 1932 to 1934, confirmed that Duranty knowingly misrepresented information about the nature and scale of the famine.

There are allegations that Duranty's deliberate misdirection concerning the famine resulted from duress. Conquest believed Duranty was being blackmailed over his sexual proclivities.

In his 1944 book, Duranty wrote in a chastened tone about his 1932–34 reporting, but he offered only a Stalinist defense. He admits that people starved, including not just "class enemies" but also loyal communists, but he says that Stalin was forced to order the requisitions to equip the Red Army enough to deter an imminent Japanese invasion (a reprise of the Siberian Intervention of a decade earlier)—in other words, to save the Soviet Union from impending military doom, not because Stalin wanted to collectivize the population at gunpoint, on pain of death. Although it is likely that Stalin did expect a Japanese invasion (expecting foreign attacks all the time), most historians today do not accept the view that it was his sole motivation.

== Calls for revocation of Pulitzer Prize, 1990–2003 ==
Controversy and concern over Duranty's reporting on the famine in Soviet Ukraine led to a move to posthumously and symbolically strip him of the Pulitzer Prize he received in 1932.

In response to Stalin's Apologist (1990), the critical biography by Sally J. Taylor, The New York Times assigned a member of its editorial board, Karl Meyer, to write a signed editorial about Duranty's work for the Times. In a scathing piece on 24 June 1990, Meyer wrote that Duranty's articles were "some of the worst reporting to appear in this newspaper." Duranty, Meyer said, had bet his career on Stalin's rise and "strove to preserve it by ignoring or excusing Stalin's crimes." The Pulitzer Board in 1990 reconsidered the prize but decided to preserve it as awarded. Four years earlier, in a 1986 The New York Times review of Robert Conquest's The Harvest of Sorrow (1986), former Moscow bureau reporter Craig Whitney wrote that Duranty effectively ignored the famine until it was almost over.

In 2003, following an international campaign by the Ukrainian Canadian Civil Liberties Association, the Pulitzer Board began a renewed inquiry, and The New York Times hired Mark von Hagen, a professor of Russian history at Columbia University, to review Duranty's work as a whole. Von Hagen found Duranty's reports to be unbalanced and uncritical, which far too often gave voice to Stalinist propaganda. In comments to the press, he stated, "For the sake of The New York Times' honor, they should take the prize away." The Times sent von Hagen's report to the Pulitzer Board and left it to the Board to take whatever action they considered appropriate.

In a letter accompanying the report, The New York Times publisher Arthur Ochs Sulzberger, Jr. called Duranty's work "slovenly" and said it "should have been recognized for what it was by his editors and by his Pulitzer judges seven decades ago."

Ultimately, Sig Gissler, administrator of the Pulitzer Prize board, declined to revoke the award. In a 21 November 2003 press release, he stated that, with regard to the 13 articles by Duranty from 1931 submitted for the award, "there was not clear and convincing evidence of deliberate deception, the relevant standard in this case."

The 2022 Russian invasion of Ukraine, part of the Russo-Ukrainian War, led to renewed attention on this decision. The New York Times executive editor Bill Keller publicly expressed remorse that he did not do more to return the award in 2003, saying, "A Pulitzer Prize is not just an accolade for an isolated piece of work. It at least implies an accolade for the reporter's performance, and Duranty's performance was shameful."

== Literary awards ==
(other than Pulitzer)

- O. Henry Awards, First Prize, 1928, for "The Parrot", Redbook, March 1928.

== In popular culture ==
Duranty is portrayed by Peter Sarsgaard in the film Mr. Jones (2019). The film depicts the story of journalist Gareth Jones as he seeks to find the truth about what was happening in Ukraine and then to have that story reported to the world in the face of opposition and denials from Stalin's Kremlin and Duranty.

== Works ==
=== Books ===
(chronological)

- The Curious Lottery and Other Tales of Russian Justice. New York: Coward–McCann, 1929
- Red Economics. New York: Houghton Mifflin Company, 1932
- Duranty Reports Russia. New York: The Viking Press, 1934
- I Write As I Please. New York: Simon and Schuster, 1935
- Europe—War or Peace? World Affairs Pamphlets No. 7. New York: Foreign Policy Association and Boston: World Peace Foundation, 1935.
- Solomon's Cat. Grand Rapids: Mayhew Press, 1937.
- One Life, One Kopeck – A Novel. New York: Simon and Schuster, 1937
- Babies Without Tails, Stories by Walter Duranty. New York: Modern Age Books, 1937
- The Kremlin and the People. New York: Reynal & Hitchcock, 1941
- USSR: The Story of Soviet Russia. New York: J.B. Lippincott Company, 1944
- Stalin & Co.: The Politburo, The Men Who Run Russia. New York: W. Sloane Associates, 1949

=== Periodicals ===
(contributor)

- "The Parrot", Redbook, March, 1928.
- ASIA Magazine, Volume XXXV, Number 11; November, 1935.
- ASIA Magazine, Volume XXXVI, Number 2; February, 1936.

==== Articles submitted for 1932 Pulitzer Prize ====
Eleven-part series in The New York Times:

- "Red Russia of Today Ruled by Stalinism, Not Communism" (14 June 1931)
- "Socialism First Aim in Soviet's Program; Trade Gains Second" (16 June 1931)
- "Stalinism Shelves World Revolt Idea; To Win Russia First" (18 June 1931)
- "Industrial Success Emboldens Soviet in New World Policy" (19 June 1931)
- "Trade Equilibrium is New Soviet Goal" (20 June 1931)
- "Soviet Fixes Opinion by Widest Control" (22 June 1931)
- "Soviet Censorship Hurts Russia Most" (23 June 1931)
- "Stalinism Smashes Foes in Marx's Name" (24 June 1931)
- "Red Army is Held No Menace to Peace" (25 June 1931)
- "Stalinism Solving Minorities Problem" (26 June 1931)
- "Stalinism's Mark is Party Discipline" (27 June 1931)

Two articles in The New York Times magazine:

- "The Russian Looks at the World" (29 March 1931)
- "Stalin's Russia Is An Echo of Iron Ivan's" (20 December 1931)

=== Translations ===
- The Story of the Lafayette Escadrille, told by its Commander, Captain Georges Thenault. Translated by Walter Duranty. Boston: Small, Maynard & Company (1921).

== See also ==
- Gareth Jones (journalist)
- Journalistic scandal
- Lion Feuchtwanger
- Louis Fischer
- Malcolm Muggeridge
- Mission to Moscow
- Moscow Trials
- Tucker Carlson's interview with Vladimir Putin
