= Serhii Bukovskyi =

Ukrainian film director

- Сергій Буковський
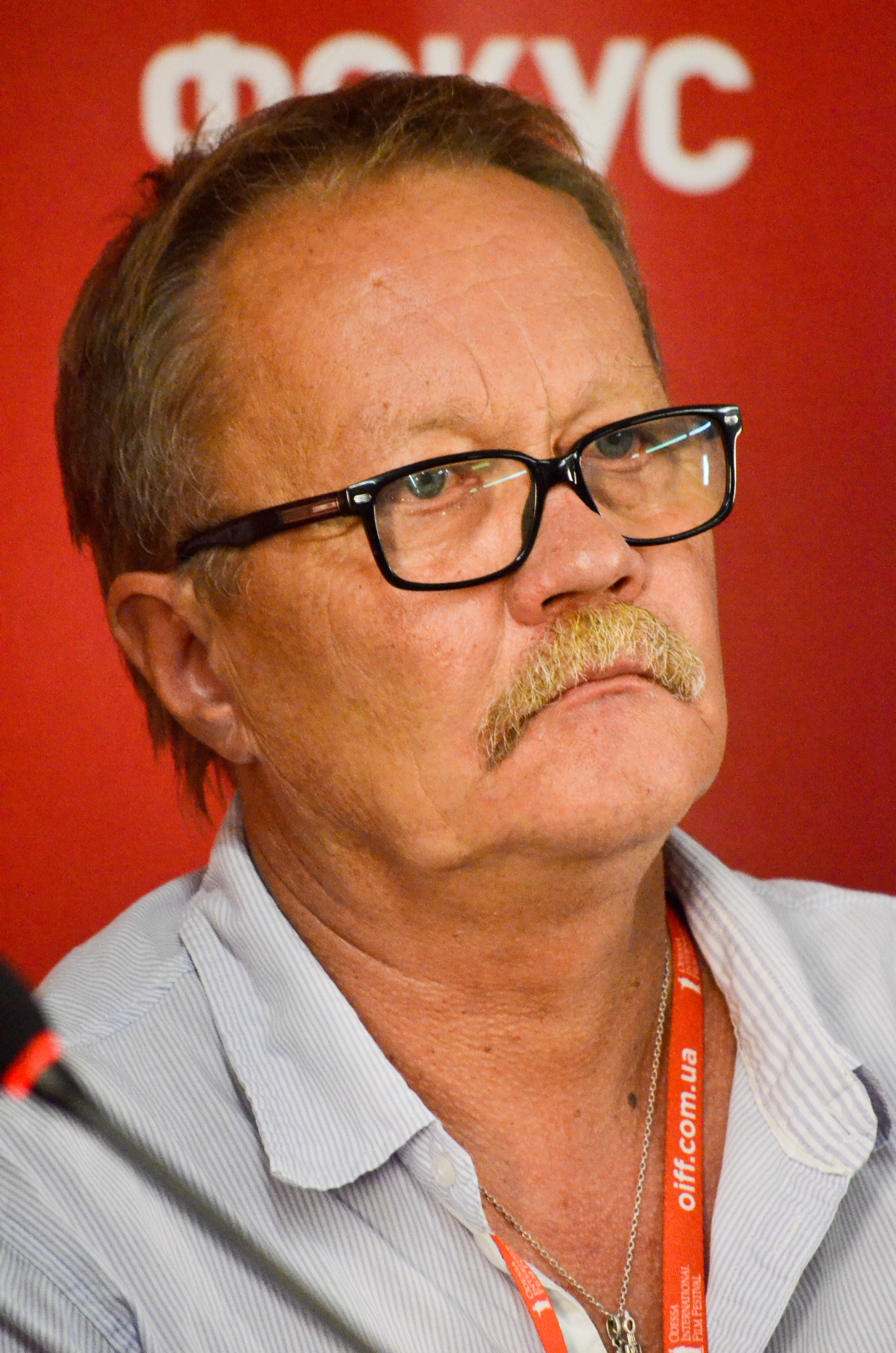
- Serhii Bukovskyi at the 6th Odesa International Film Festival in 2015.
- Born: 18 July 1960 (age 66); Oktyabrsky, Bashkir ASSR, Russian SFSR, Soviet Union
- Citizenship: Soviet, Ukrainian
- Occupations: Film Director, Actor
- Awards: Merited Artist of Ukraine • People's Artist of Ukraine • Shevchenko National Prize

Serhii Anatoliiovych Bukovskyi (Ukrainian: Сергій Анатолійович Буковський; born 18 July 1960) is a Ukrainian documentary film director and actor. Bukovskyi is a member of the Board of the Ukrainian Association of Cinematographers and laureate of the Shevchenko National Prize. He was awarded the honorary title of Merited Artist of Ukraine in 1996 and the title People's Artist of Ukraine in 2008. Representing the critical school of Ukrainian documentary filmmaking.

== Biography ==
Serhii Bukovskyi was born in Bashkortostan in 1960, to Film director Anatoliy Bukovskyi and actress Nina Antonova. His family moved to Kyiv later that year.

From 1977 to 1982, Bukovskyi attended the Kyiv National I. K. Karpenko-Kary Theatre, Cinema and Television University, where he studied directing.

For over a decade, Bukovskyi worked as a film director at the Ukrainian Documentary Film Studio.

From 1995 to 1998, he was the head of the document project department at Interviews Ukraine.

From 1998 to 2003, Bukovskyi taught at Kyiv National I. K. Karpenko-Kary Theatre, Cinema and Television University, teaching courses in documentary directing. One of his students, Igor Strembitsky, would go on to win the Palme d'Or at the Cannes Film Festival.

== Filmography ==
Bukovskyi has made around 50 films in his career. These include:

- "Tomorrow is Holy" ( 1987 )
- "And the Night Was Dark ... " ( 1988 )
- "Dream" ( 1989 )
- "Roof" ( 1989 )
- "Dislocation" ( 1992 )
- "Dash Mark" ( 1992 )
- "Landscape. Portrait. Still Life" ( 1993 )
- "To Berlin!" ( 1995 )
- "Ten Years of Alienation" ( 1996 )
- "The Bridge" ( 1999 )
- "Vilen Kalyuta. Real Light" ( 2000 )
- "Terra Vermelha. Red Earth" ( 2001 )
- "War. The Ukrainian Account" ( 2002 - 2003 )
- "Spell Your Name" ( 2006 )
- "Everyone Must Die" ( 2007 )
- "The Living" ( 2008 )
- " Ukraine. Reference Point" ( 2011 )
- "The Main Role" ( 2016 )
- "V. Silvestrov" ( 2020)

Many of Bukovskyi's films have won numerous awards. His World War II documentary "War. The Ukrainian Account" won the Taras Shevchenko National Prize of Ukraine in 2004. His 2009 film on The Holodomor, titled "The Living," was shown at multiple festivals, including the Human Rights Festival in Stockholm (April 2009), and won awards such as the Special Jury Prize of the International Art House Cinema Festival in Batumi in September 2009. His 2006 holocaust documentary "Spell Your Name," which was produced and presented by Steven Spielberg, has also seen moderate success internationally.
