= Joan London (American writer) =

American writer (1901–1971)

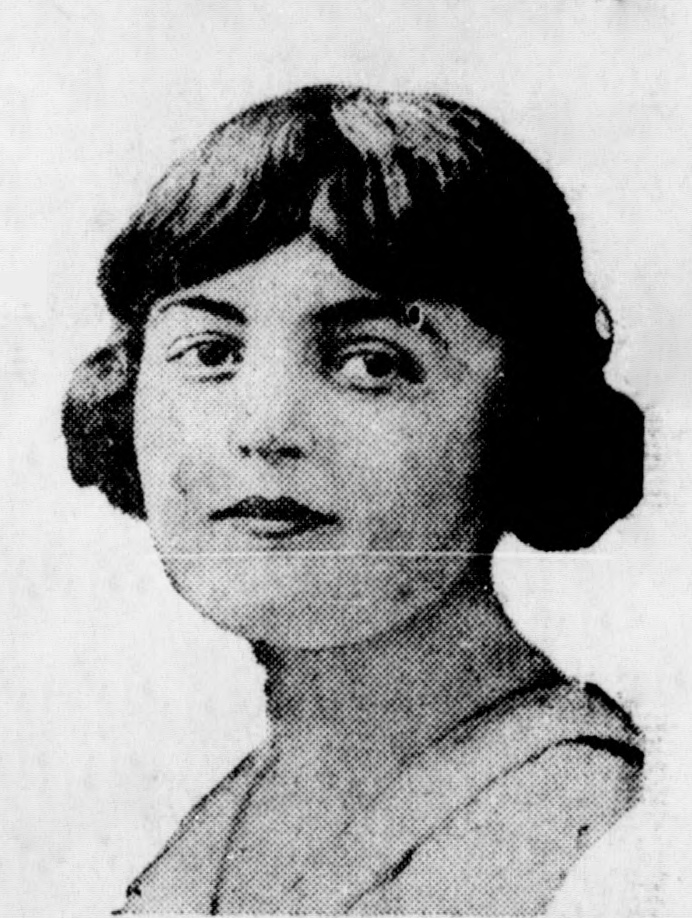
- Portrait of London from the The Alaska Daily Empire, 1924
- Born: January 15, 1901; Piedmont, California, United States
- Died: January 18, 1971 (aged 70)
- Resting place: Yosemite
- Education: University of California
- Occupation: Writer
- Spouses: Park Abbott (m. 1921–1924) Charles Malamuth (m. 1926–1936)
- Partner: Barney Mayes
- Children: 1
- Parent(s): Bess Maddern and Jack London
- Writing career
- Pen name: B. J. Maylon
- Language: English
- Political party: CPUSA

Joan London (January 15, 1901 – January 18, 1971) was an American writer and the older of two daughters born to Jack London and his first wife, Elizabeth "Bess" Maddern London.

== Biography ==
Joan's sibling, Becky, was born on October 20, 1902. Both children were born in Piedmont, California. Their father left in 1903, and was only able to visit them at their home following a divorce in 1905. Due to his frequent travels, he did not see his daughters for long stretches of time.

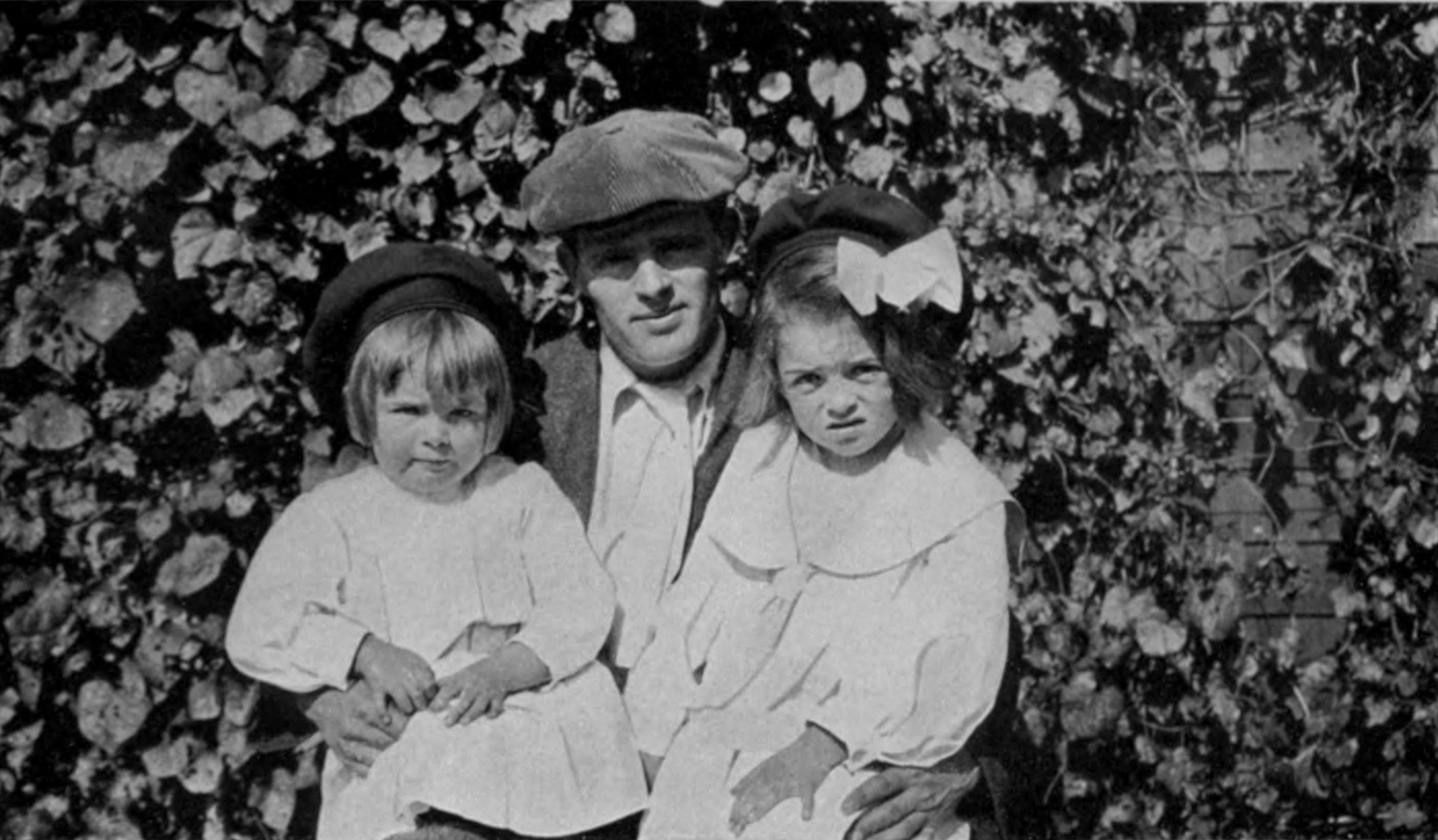
Joan (right) with her father and sister, c. 1905.

The daughters enjoyed a comfortable middle-class childhood, with music, dance and drama lessons. Nonetheless, Joan in particular suffered from an ongoing conflict because Bess refused to allow the girls to visit Jack on his ranch. When she was ten, Joan's letters began to include her mother's various requests for additional funds. Being placed in this difficult spot made her the brunt of her father's anger at times. London changed his will in favor of everything going to his second wife, Charmian Kittredge London, charging her to support his first family. Following his death in 1916, the discovery proved disadvantageous to his daughters.

Joan attended the University of California at Berkeley, majoring in history. Following graduation, in 1921 she married Park Abbott and had a son, Bart. She divorced him in 1924 following physical and emotional abuse. She supported herself through public speaking around the country, her usual topics her Father or on Socialist themes.

She wed Slavic Language professor Charles Malamuth in 1926. They divorced in 1930 and remarried soon afterwards. During a long visit to Russia in 1930, they befriended poet E. E. Cummings. Later, Cummings featured the couple in EIMI, with Joan referred to as Turkess or Harem. Joan's notes about the country focus on the condition of women and writers. The couple separated in 1934 and divorced two years later.

During 1934–35, Joan went to Hollywood, where she tried to break into screenwriting while running a personal assistance service. She had a novel, 320 Panoramic pass around New York publishers without success. Twentieth Century Fox hired her to write publicity for its movie based on her father's The Call of the Wild, and invited her to the set. Most of her friends were of the Hungarian refugee group that were becoming key directors, designers and actors.

Returning to the San Francisco Bay area, Joan met a fellow committed to Trotskyism, Barney Mayes. They lived together and she joined him in editing the weekly publication of the Maritime Federation of the Pacific. Waterfront leader Harry Bridges threatened their lives for being against his tactics, and later accused them of being anti-working class and against the Soviet Union. During the longshoremen strikes of 1936–37, beatings and murders, most unsolved, occurred. Joan and Barney wrote Corpse With Knee Action under the pseudonym B. J. Maylon. A related story of the waterfront conflicts, Embarcadero, was unpublished.

During the 1940s, Joan London worked for the California Labor Federation in San Francisco. She worked there over twenty years, writing speeches, reports, and the weekly newsletter. She continued to be active in the Berkeley branches of the Communist Party USA, then aligned with the Allies during WWII. She married Charles L. "Indian" Miller in 1948. Although he was not political, Miller appears in the large FBI file kept on Joan. She was on many leftist or union-focused mailing lists. Ironically, Malamuth (her first husband), no longer leftist, was an informer.

She died of throat cancer on January 18, 1971, three days after her 70th birthday. She was cremated. Her son was instructed to throw her ashes into the ocean, but he could not bring himself to do it, so he buried them in Yosemite.

== Writing career ==
Joan London's first publication was a serial published in the Oakland Tribune from December 6, 1926 to February 24, 1927. Sylvia Coventry is reminiscent of her father's love triad novels. Sylvia rebuffs a proposal and moves to Hawaii to work on as the welfare worker on a plantation. There she is bewitched by an ominous intruder who provokes her into various incarnations. This one attempt at fiction convinced her it was not her metier.

Trained in historical research, during the late 1930s, Joan researched Jack London and His Times, a biography of her father. To do so, she received permission from Charmian Kittredge London to view her father's archive at the Huntington Library; being cut out of her father's will, she had no independent right.

She co-authored So Shall Ye Reap: The Story of Cesar Chavez and the Farmworkers Movement with Henry Anderson. They provide an early history of the movement, beginning with Father Thomas McCullough and Ernesto Galarza. They also fault Mexico for failing to provide a sustainable economy for its poor.

Her son Bart Abbott ensured the posthumous publication of her memoir Jack London and his Daughters. There she emphasized the trauma of divorce on children.
