= Gareth Jones (journalist) =

Welsh journalist (1905–1935)

Gareth Richard Vaughan Jones
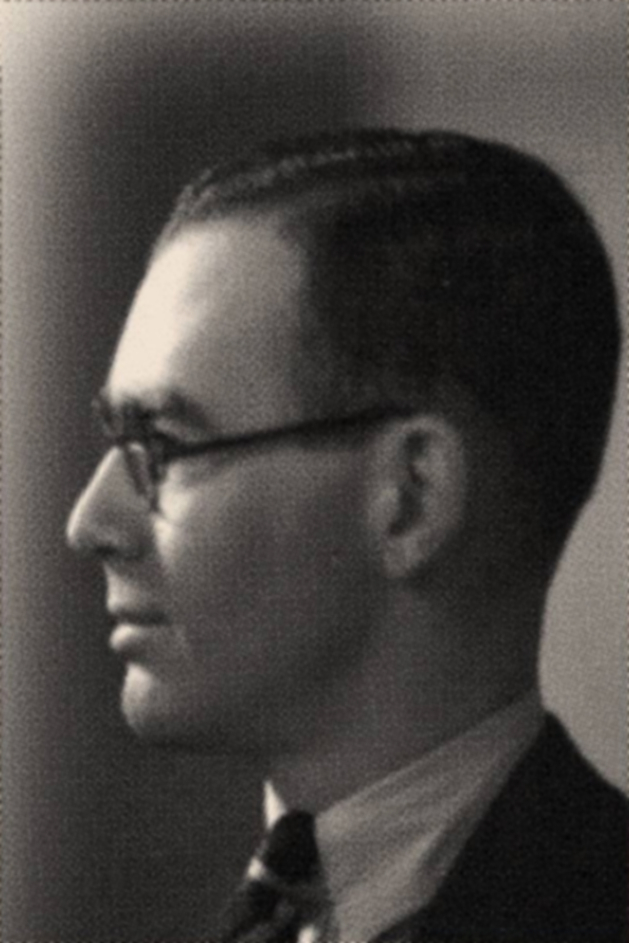
- Born: 13 August 1905; Barry, Glamorgan, Wales, United Kingdom
- Died: 12 August 1935 (aged 29); Inner Mongolia,China
- Cause of death: Murder by gunshot
- Occupation: Journalist

Gareth Richard Vaughan Jones (13 August 1905 – 12 August 1935) was a Welsh journalist who in March 1933 first reported in the Western world, without equivocation and under his own name, the existence of the Soviet famine of 1930–1933, including the Holodomor and the Asharshylyk. (Note: Timothy Snyder 2010, Bloodlands: Europe Between Hitler and Stalin: "The basic facts of mass hunger and death, although sometimes reported in the European and American press, never took on the clarity of an undisputed event. Almost no one claimed that Stalin meant to starve Ukrainians to death; even Adolf Hitler preferred to blame the Marxist system. It was controversial to note that starvation was taking place at all. Gareth Jones did so in a handful of newspaper articles; it seems that he was the only one to do so in English under his own name… Though the journalists knew less than the diplomats, most of them understood that millions were dying from hunger. … Aside from Jones, the only journalist to file serious reports in English was Malcolm Muggeridge, writing anonymously for the Manchester Guardian. He wrote that the famine was "one of the most monstrous crimes in history, so terrible that people in the future will scarcely be able to believe that it happened.")

Jones had reported anonymously in The Times in 1931 on starvation in both Soviet Russia and Soviet Ukraine. After his third visit to the Soviet Union, he issued a press release under his own name in Berlin on 29 March 1933 describing the widespread famine in detail. Reports by Malcolm Muggeridge, writing in 1933 as an anonymous correspondent, appeared contemporaneously in the Manchester Guardian; his first anonymous article specifying famine in the Soviet Union was published on 25 March 1933.

After being banned from re-entering the Soviet Union, Jones journeyed to the Far East to report on the Japanese invasion of Manchuria. Ignoring warnings from the British Embassy of their presence, he was kidnapped by Chinese bandits and murdered in 1935 while investigating in Japanese-occupied Inner Mongolia. It is unclear whether the bandits were tipped off by the Japanese or the Soviet secret police, the NKVD. Upon his death, former British prime minister David Lloyd George said, "He had a passion for finding out what was happening in foreign lands wherever there was trouble, and in pursuit of his investigations he shrank from no risk. … Nothing escaped his observation, and he allowed no obstacle to turn from his course when he thought that there was some fact, which he could obtain. He had the almost unfailing knack of getting at things that mattered."

== Early life and education ==
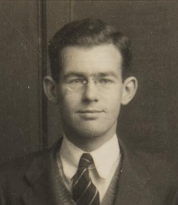
Gareth Jones in the Aberystwyth Students Union Committee circa 1925

Born in Barry, Glamorgan, Jones attended Barry County School, where his father, Major Edgar Jones, was headmaster until around 1933. His mother, Annie Gwen Jones, had worked in Russia as a tutor to the children of Arthur Hughes, son of Welsh steel industrialist John Hughes, who founded the town of Hughesovka (modern-day Donetsk) in today's eastern Ukraine.

Jones graduated from the University College of Wales, Aberystwyth in 1926 with a first-class honours degree in French. He also studied at the University of Strasbourg and at Trinity College, Cambridge, from which he graduated in 1929 with another first in French, German, and Russian. After his death, one of his tutors, Hugh Fraser Stewart, wrote in The Times that Jones had been an "extraordinary linguist". At Cambridge he was active in the Cambridge University League of Nations Union, serving as its assistant secretary.

== Career ==
=== Teaching; adviser to Lloyd George ===
After graduating, Jones taught languages briefly at Cambridge, and then in January 1930 was hired as Foreign Affairs Adviser to the British MP and former prime minister David Lloyd George, thanks to an introduction by Thomas Jones. The post involved preparing notes and briefings Lloyd George could use in debates, articles, and speeches, and also included some travel abroad.

=== Journalism ===
In 1929, Jones became a professional freelance reporter, and by 1930 he was submitting articles to a variety of newspapers and journals.

==== Germany ====
In late January and some of February 1933, Jones was in Germany covering the accession to power of the Nazi Party, and he was in Leipzig on the day Adolf Hitler was appointed Chancellor. Some three weeks later, on 23 February in the Richthofen, "the fastest and most powerful three-motored aeroplane in Germany", Jones, along with Sefton Delmer, became the first foreign journalists, after he became Chancellor, to fly with Hitler. They accompanied Hitler and Joseph Goebbels to Frankfurt where Jones reported for the Western Mail on the new Chancellor's tumultuous acclamation in that city. He wrote that if the Richthofen had crashed the history of Europe would be changed.

==== Soviet Union ====
By 1932, Jones had been to the Soviet Union twice, for three weeks in the summer of 1930 and for a month in the summer of 1931. He had reported the findings of each trip in his published articles, including three articles titled "The Two Russias" he published anonymously in The Times in 1930, and three increasingly explicit articles, also anonymous, titled "The Real Russia" in The Times in October 1931, which reported on starvation among Russian peasants along the Volga River and German colonists near Dnieperstroy in Soviet Ukraine.

In March 1933, he travelled to the Soviet Union for a third time. On 10th March, he left Moscow for the Russian Black Earth District, south of Belogorod, and the Kharkov district of the Ukrainian SSR, on a journey made possible by an invitation from Oscar Ehrt, Vice Consul at the German Consulate in Kharkov. The Vice Consul's son, Adolf Ehrt, was a leading Nazi propagandist who became head of Goebbels’ Anti-Komintern agency. Jones got off the train 40 miles before his declared destination and walked across the border from the Russian SFSR. As he walked he kept diaries of the starvation he witnessed. On his return to Berlin on 29 March, he issued a press release, which was published by many newspapers, including The Manchester Guardian and the New York Evening Post:

I walked along through villages and twelve collective farms. Everywhere was the cry, 'There is no bread. We are dying'. This cry came from every part of Russia, from the Volga, Siberia, White Russia, the North Caucasus, and Central Asia. I tramped through the black earth region because that was once the richest farmland in Russia and because the correspondents have been forbidden to go there to see for themselves what is happening.

In the train a Communist denied to me that there was a famine. I flung a crust of bread, which I had been eating from my own supply, into a spittoon. A peasant fellow-passenger fished it out and ravenously ate it. I threw an orange peel into the spittoon, and the peasant again grabbed it and devoured it. The Communist subsided. I stayed overnight in a village where there used to be two hundred oxen and where there are now six. The peasants were eating the cattle fodder and had only a month's supply left. They told me that many had already died of hunger. Two soldiers came to arrest a thief. They warned me against travel by night, as there were too many 'starving', desperate men.

'We are waiting for death' was my welcome, but see, we still, have our cattle fodder. Go farther south. There, they have nothing. Many houses are empty of people already dead,' they cried.

This report was denounced by Moscow-resident British journalist Walter Duranty, who had been obscuring the truth to please the Soviet regime. On 31 March, The New York Times published on page 13 of its paper a denial of Jones's statement by Duranty under the headline "Russians Hungry, But Not Starving". Duranty called Jones's report "a big scare story".

Historian Timothy Snyder has written that "Duranty's claim that there was 'no actual starvation' but only 'widespread mortality from diseases due to malnutrition' echoed Soviet usages and pushed euphemism into mendacity. This was an Orwellian distinction; and indeed George Orwell himself regarded the Ukrainian famine of 1933 as a central example of a black truth that artists of language had covered with bright colors."

Duranty's article claimed, citing multiple Soviet and foreign sources, "there is no famine"; part of The New York Times headline was: "Russian and Foreign Observers in Country See No Ground for Predictions of Disaster."

On 11 April 1933, Jones published a detailed analysis of the famine in the Financial News, pointing out its main causes: forced collectivization of private farms, removal of 6–7 millions of "best workers" (the Kulaks) from their land, forced requisitions of grain and farm animals and increased "export of foodstuffs" from USSR, for which he wrote "it is not so much the Soviet Government as the world crisis, which is to blame". He wrote:

What are the causes of the famine? The main reason for the catastrophe in Russian agriculture is the Soviet policy of collectivisation. The prophecy of Paul Scheffer in 1929–30 that collectivisation of agriculture would be the nemesis of Communism has come absolutely true.

On 13 May, The New York Times published a strong rebuttal of Duranty by Jones, who stood by his report:

My first evidence was gathered from foreign observers. Since Mr. Duranty introduces consuls into the discussion, a thing I am loath to do, for they are official representatives of their countries and should not be quoted, may I say that I discussed the Russian situation with between twenty and thirty consuls and diplomatic representatives of various nations and that their evidence supported my point of view. But they are not allowed to express their views in the press, and therefore remain silent. Journalists, on the other hand, are allowed to write, but the censorship has turned them into masters of euphemism and understatement. Hence, they give "famine" the polite name of 'food shortage' and 'starving to death' is softened down to read as 'widespread mortality from diseases due to malnutrition'. Consuls are not so reticent in private conversation.

In a personal letter from Soviet Foreign Commissar Maxim Litvinov (whom Jones had interviewed while in Moscow) to Lloyd George, Jones was informed that he was banned from ever visiting the Soviet Union again. After his Soviet articles, Jones took up his new job in Cardiff on the Western Mail covering "arts, crafts and coracles", according to his great-nephew Nigel Linsan Colley. Yet he managed to get an interview with the owner of nearby St Donat's Castle, the American press magnate William Randolph Hearst. Hearst published Jones's account of what had happened in Ukraine – as he did for the almost identical eye-witness testimony of the disillusioned American Communist Fred Beal. Hearst also arranged for Jones to undertake a lecture and broadcast tour of the US.

==== Japan and China ====
Banned from the Soviet Union, Jones turned his attention to the Far East and in late 1934 he left Britain on a "Round-the-World Fact-Finding Tour". He spent about six weeks in Japan, interviewing important generals and politicians, and he eventually reached Beijing. From there, he travelled to Inner Mongolia where he secured an interview with Inner Mongolian independence leader Demchugdongrub (Prince De). He continued his journey to Dolonor close to the border of Japanese-occupied Manchukuo in the company of a German journalist, Herbert Müller. Detained by Japanese forces there, the pair were told that there were three routes back to the Chinese town of Kalgan, only one of which was safe.

== Kidnapping and death ==
Jones and Müller were captured en route by bandits who demanded a ransom of 200 Mauser firearms and 100,000 Chinese dollars (according to The Times, equivalent to about £8,000). Müller was released after two days to arrange for the ransom to be paid. On 1 August, Jones's father received a telegram: "Well treated. Expect release soon." On 5 August, The Times reported that the kidnappers had moved Jones to an area 10 miles (16 kilometres) southeast of Kuyuan and were now asking for 10,000 Chinese dollars (about £800), and two days later he had again been moved, this time to Jehol. On 8 August, the news came that the first group of kidnappers had handed him over to a second group, and the ransom had increased to 100,000 Chinese dollars again. The Chinese and Japanese governments both made an effort to contact the kidnappers.

On 17 August 1935, The Times reported that the Chinese authorities had found Jones's body the previous day with three bullet wounds. The authorities believed that he had been killed on 12 August, the day before his 30th birthday. It is unclear whether the bandits were tipped off by the Japanese or the Soviet secret police, the NKVD. Others, such as his official biographer Margaret Siriol Colley, point to Japanese involvement.

Shanxi historians Li Xin and Sun Yuxin argued that the suspicious aspect of Jones’s kidnapping lay in the fact that the kidnappers did not prioritize monetary gain, unlike most groups who kidnapped foreigners, and that according to contemporary reports, the German journalist Herbert Mueller, who was traveling with Jones, was not abducted or forced to flee on horseback but was instead released unconditionally.

By 2002, historians learned from declassified British intelligence files that Müller had another identity: he was an intelligence agent for the Soviet NKVD. British security services maintained a dedicated intelligence file on Müller from 1917 to 1951. Müller had already attracted special attention from the British military attaché in China between 1927 and 1928, and in 1934 British authorities discovered that Müller had used the alias “Gordon” in Hankou (Hankow). Meanwhile, the German firm in Zhangjiakou (Kalgan) that provided transportation for Jones and Müller—Wostwag (West-Osteuropäische Warenaustausch A-G)—was a front company established by the Fourth Department (Intelligence) of the Soviet Red Army General Staff.

Lloyd George is reported to have said:

That part of the world is a cauldron of conflicting intrigue and one or other interests concerned probably knew that Mr Gareth Jones knew too much of what was going on. He had a passion for finding out what was happening in foreign lands wherever there was trouble, and in pursuit of his investigations he shrank from no risk. I had always been afraid that he would take one risk too many. Nothing escaped his observation, and he allowed no obstacle to turn from his course when he thought that there was some fact, which he could obtain. He had the almost unfailing knack of getting at things that mattered.

== Legacy ==
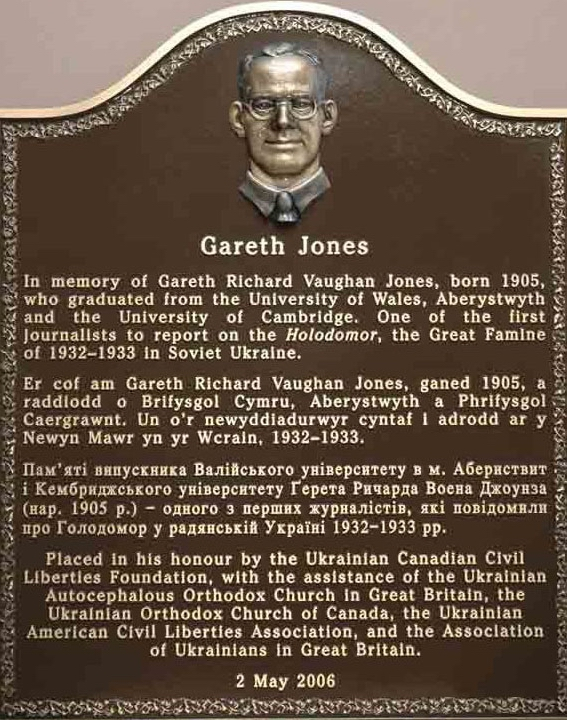
Memorial plaque to Jones in Old College, Aberystwyth

=== Memorial ===
On 2 May 2006, a trilingual memorial plaque (English/Welsh/Ukrainian) was unveiled in Jones's memory in the Old College at Aberystwyth University. His niece Margaret Siriol Colley was present along with the Ukrainian Ambassador to the UK, Ihor Kharchenko, who described Jones as an "unsung hero of Ukraine". The idea for a plaque and funding were provided by the Ukrainian Canadian Civil Liberties Association, working in conjunction with the Association of Ukrainians in Great Britain. Dr Lubomyr Luciuk, UCCLA's director of research, spoke at the unveiling ceremony.

In November 2008, Jones and fellow journalist Malcolm Muggeridge were posthumously awarded the Ukrainian Order of Merit at a ceremony in Westminster Central Hall, by Dr Kharchenko, on behalf of Ukrainian President Viktor Yushchenko for their exceptional service to the country and its people.

Another plaque honouring Jones was unveiled at the Merthyr Dyfan Cemetery Chapel in Barry, Wales, on 30 October 2022, with the support of the Temerty Foundation, the Holodomor Research and Education Consortium, and the Ukrainian Canadian Civil Liberties Foundation. Another plaque honoring him was placed in the National Library of Ukraine, in Kyiv, on 4 October 2023.

=== Diaries ===
In November 2009, Jones's diaries recording the Great Soviet Famine of 1932–33 went on display for the first time in the Wren Library of Trinity College, Cambridge.

Due to the permission of Jones' great nephew and literary executor Philip Colley and the financial support of the Temerty Foundation, the Ukrainian National Women's League of America and the Ukrainian Canadian Civil Liberties Foundation, most of the papers of Gareth Jones, including all of his diaries, were digitized and copies were then made available online to scholars and students around the world.

=== Depictions in film ===
Serhii Bukovskyi's 2008 Ukrainian film The Living is a documentary about the Ukrainian Famine of 1932–33 and Jones' reporting of it. The Living premiered 21 November 2008 at the Kyiv Cinema House. It was screened in February 2009 at the European Film Market, in spring 2009 at the Ukrainian Film Festival in Cologne, and in November 2009 at the Second Annual Cambridge Festival of Ukrainian Film. It received the 2009 Special Jury Prize Silver Apricot in the International Documentary Competition at the Sixth Golden Apricot International Film Festival in July 2009 and the 2009 Grand Prize of Geneva in September 2009.

In 2012, the documentary film Hitler, Stalin, and Mr Jones, directed by George Carey, was broadcast on the BBC series Storyville. It has subsequently been screened in select cinemas.

The 2019 feature film Mr. Jones, starring James Norton and directed by Agnieszka Holland, focuses on Jones' investigation and reporting of the famine in Soviet Ukraine. The film has been heavily criticised by his surviving family due to several events that were included in the movie that Jones himself had never witnessed or written about and for its erasure of the pan-Soviet nature of his famine testimony. In January 2019, it was selected to compete for the Golden Bear at the 69th Berlin International Film Festival. The film won Grand Prix Golden Lions at the 44th Gdynia Film Festival in September 2019.

== Commemoration ==
The cities of Dnipro, Kyiv, Kharkiv and Kremenchuk have a Gareth Jones Street. There is also a Gareth Jones Lane in the cities of Dnipro and Kropyvnytskyi.

== See also ==
- List of unsolved murders (1900–1979)
- Soviet famine of 1921
- Soviet famine of 1946–47
