= Metro-Vickers Affair =

1933 Soviet arrest and show trial of British subjects

The Metro-Vickers Affair was an international crisis precipitated by the arrest of six British subjects who were employees of Metropolitan-Vickers, and their public trial in 1933 by the authorities in the Soviet Union on charges of "wrecking" and espionage. The show trial garnered international press coverage, generated broad public criticism over alleged violations of legal process, and resulted in the conviction and ultimate deportation of the defendants, following extensive diplomatic pressure.

== History ==
=== Background ===
The expansion of electrical power generation was long regarded as one of the highest priorities by the ruling Communist Party, embodied by Lenin's November 1920 epigram that "Communism is Soviet power plus electrification of the whole country" –an injunction programmatically advanced by the 1920 GOELRO plan. With Soviet electrical engineers and advanced generation equipment in chronically short supply in this period, the Soviet Union turned at once to the hiring of foreign specialists and the importation of machinery produced abroad in an effort to expeditiously overcome the deficit during the years of the first Five Year Plan, launched in 1928.

One of the foreign firms contracting with the Soviet government for the installation of electrical equipment and its supervision in production was the British firm Metropolitan-Vickers (Metrovick). The firm had actively pursued engineering contracts outside of the UK through its subsidiary, the Metropolitan-Vickers Electrical Export Company, established in 1919. Other electrical companies supplying power generating equipment to the Soviet Union during the 1920s and 1930s included the German company Siemens and the American corporation General Electric.

On 7 January 1933, Soviet leader Joseph Stalin made a speech on the first Five-Year Plan, but concluded with an ominous warning against counter-revolutionary elements which he claimed were still working to bring about the downfall of the Soviet state:

"Thrown out of their groove, and scattered over the whole face of the USSR, these 'has-beens' have wormed their way into our plants and factories, into our government offices and trading organizations, into our railway and transport enterprises... What did they carry with them into these places? Of course, they carried with them a feeling of hatred towards the Soviet regime, a feeling of burning enmity towards the new forms of economy, life, and culture.

"These gentlemen are no longer able to launch a frontal attack against the Soviet regime. They and their classes made such attacks several times, but they were routed and dispersed. Hence, the only thing left them is to do mischief and harm to the workers, to the collective farmers, to the Soviet regime, and to the Party. And they are doing as much mischief as they can, acting on the sly. They set fire to warehouses and wreck machinery. They organize sabotage.

"As a result of fulfilling the five year plan we have succeeded in finally ejecting the last remnants of the hostile classes from their positions in production... But that is not enough. The task is to eject these 'has-beens' from our own enterprises and institutions and make them harmless for good and all."

One of the chief parties in the Metro-Vickers affair was himself clear about a connection between such an official call to vigilance and the events which would follow, declaring in a 1934 memoir that "the OGPU were not slow in discovering and revealing the existence of numerous plots" in response to Stalin's "call for action," thereby "proving the words of the 'Dictator.'"

=== The arrests ===
On 25 January 1933, the OGPU "literally dragged" the secretary of six years for Metro-Vickers' Moscow chief, Allan Monkhouse, into a waiting motor car and drove her off to OGPU headquarters at Lubyanka Square. Secretary Anna Kutusova returned, "exhausted and terrified," to Monkhouse's office at 10 am the next day, her fingers stained with ink from writing. "What had occurred, she would not and probably dared not say," Monkhouse later recalled, adding that he felt sure that threats had been used to cause her to henceforth "act as an agent of the OGPU" and assist in the effort to "frame up" a case against her employer and his associates.

With the Soviet secret police clearly investigating the firm, Monkhouse left Moscow for England on 6 February 1933, for a three-week stay. The Soviet Union's trade representative in London, who had himself just arrived from Moscow, gave Monkhouse a firm assurance on 10 February that the OGPU investigation of Metro-Vickers had been discussed with the OGPU’s chiefs and that these high officials knew nothing of any action planned against the British firm. Monkhouse consequently returned to Moscow as planned.

At 9:15 p.m. on 11 March 1933, as Metro-Vickers officials L.C. Thornton and Monkhouse were conversing with two guests representing a large engineering firm, eight OGPU officers burst into the room, instructing those present to remain seated. The deputy chief of the Economic Department of the OGPU presented Monkhouse with search and arrest warrants and some five hours of close investigation followed. Monkhouse later estimated that between 50 and 80 select OGPU officials were involved in the carefully planned raid.

Those arrested were Allan Monkhouse, his assistant Leslie C Thornton, John Cushney and William MacDonald. Four Russian employees were also taken into custody.

Monkhouse was allowed to take a bath before being taken away to GPU headquarters at the Lubyanka, where he was kept in a comparatively comfortable isolation cell. After a difficult night, Monkhouse was taken to the examination department and interrogated. Monkhouse asserted that no physical torture, hypnotism, or drugs were used on him but that the interrogation was conducted for many hours on end, running without interruption from breakfast time until 2 am. Monkhouse denied repeatedly that he was a British intelligence agent but later asserted that he had been overcome by exhaustion towards the end of the process and consented to write a statement.

Monkhouse later recalled:

"Towards late evening I began to get very tired.... Almost every phrase which [the interrogator] dictated I disputed, altered, and finally wrote in a form which I thought would satisfy him and yet not harm my employers’ high reputation. After midnight I felt that my nerve was going. I was dead tired after the previous night’s search and arrest, and a very long day’s intensive examination. I felt my tongue and mouth so dry that they gave me considerable discomfort. My lips twitched in a way they had never done before. It was a hard mental effort to resist writing exactly what [the interrogator] dictated and, in any case, before I left the room that night, I wrote one or two paragraphs which I greatly regret having consented to write. I can only attribute my weakness in having done so to the exhausted nervous and mental condition to which I had been reduced after a very long day’s examination by the OGPU, following a sleepless night."

Monkhouse expressed a belief that the basic method of operation of the OGPU was to "trick" those being detained into signing written statements which could later be used against them at trial. After a second lengthy day of interrogation the interview was abruptly cut short and Monkhouse was released under orders not to leave the city, apparently at the behest of OGPU chief Vyacheslav Menzhinsky.

The Soviet secret police proved to be far from finished with Monkhouse or Metro-Vickers, however. On 13 March 1933, an official statement of the OGPU was published in the pages of Izvestia, the official government newspaper, which stated:

"An investigation by the OGPU into a series of sudden and regularly recurring breakdowns which have lately occurred in big power stations (Moscow, Cheliabinsk, Zuevka, Zlatoust) has revealed that the breakdowns were the result of wrecking activity on the part of a group of criminal elements among state employees under the People’s Commissariat of Heavy Industry, who made it their object to destroy the power stations of the USSR (acts of diversion) and put out of commission the State factories served by these power stations. In the work of this wrecking group there actively participated certain employees of the British firm, Metropolitan-Vickers..."

=== The trial ===
The decision to proceed to a formal public trial relating to the British employees of Metro-Vickers was made by the Central Executive Committee of the Soviet Union on 30 March 1933. The week-long trial commenced on 12 April.

According to the formal indictment read at the start of the trial, the defendants were part of a "wrecking group" which sought to damage state equipment "with the object of undermining the power of Soviet industry and weakening the Soviet state," as well as participating in the gathering of intelligence about the defense capabilities of the USSR. It was asserted that bribery and corruption of "certain employees of state power stations" had been carried out in connection with this secret mission.

The indictment noted that a panel of 6 "expert engineers" had studied the matter in association with the office of the Prosecutor General of the RSFSR Andrey Vyshinsky and had concluded that in all the cases of breakdowns investigated there was either criminal negligence or deliberate wrecking on the part of a number of persons in the technical personnel serving these stations."

As for the charges of espionage, the prosecution cited the pre-trial interrogation transcripts of V.A. Gussev, head of the Zlatoust Power Station from 1929, who admitted collecting military-related information as well as that of W.L. MacDonald, who in his own statement acknowledged telling Gussev that he "required information about the production of military supplies at the Zlatoust works, the state of power supply, etc." MacDonald's interrogation transcript, introduced as part of the indictment, additionally indicated that the instruction to collect such material on "the political and economic situation of the USSR" had come in the summer of 1929 from his boss, L.C. Thornton.

In his damning pre-trial interrogation transcript, MacDonald also admitted attempting to sabotage military production at an attached metallurgical works by undermining electrical production at the Zlatoust power station and to have paid Gussev 2,000 or 2,500 rubles for his assistance.

Soviet authorities were anxious to counter anticipated objections that the pre-trial statements by Gussev and MacDonald had been obtained under duress, with procurator Vyshinsky publishing an interview on the politically sensitive prospective case in Izvestia on March 23 asserting that "no kind of pressure was brought to bear on the accused" and that "only enemies who are striving to impair our relations with other states would spread such absurd rumors about alleged deviations from the established rules of procedure..."

=== Outcome ===
No death sentences were handed out as a result of the April 1933 Metro-Vickers trial, with two of those indicted to stand trial not receiving punishment of any kind. Leslie Thornton received a three-year sentence and William MacDonald two years, to be served at the Sokolniki prison - though the prisoners were freed and deported two months later, following trade sanctions imposed by the British. Allan Monkhouse, Charles Nordwall and John Cushny were given expulsion. A. W. Gregory was acquitted. Of the Russians, M. Zorin received an eight-year sentence and Anna Kutusova 18 months.

In the view of the most recent study of the affair, by Nipissing University history professor Gordon W. Morrell, the comparatively mild sentences may have resulted from indecision within the Soviet government as to the severity of the alleged wrecking activity and the efficacy of draconian punishment in a case so closely impacting Soviet-British relations.

=== Legacy ===
Contemporary historians of the Soviet Union regard the Metro-Vickers Affair as one of a series of show trials conducted by the All-Union Communist Party against engineers and technicians trained under the old regime –proceedings which included the 1928 Shakhty Trial and the so-called Industrial Party Trial of 1930. All of these public spectacles seem to have been intended to send a political message, it is argued, that "older technical specialists from the old regime were not to be trusted and that [Communist] party members and Soviet citizens must be increasingly vigilant against enemies."

== See also ==
- List of show trials in the Soviet Union
