= The Lineup =

The Lineup may refer to:

- The Lineup (radio series), a police drama, 1950-1953
- The Lineup (TV series), a police drama, 1954–60, set in San Francisco
- The Lineup (film), a 1958 film directed by Don Siegel
- The Line-Up, a 1934 American film directed by Howard Higgin
- The Lineup (website), a brand content site by Open Road Integrated Media
- The Lineup (book), a 2009 book written by Otto Penzler
