= Puella Mea =

Poem by E. E. Cummings

Puella Mea is a poem by E. E. Cummings. It is notable as his longest poem, at 290 lines. The title is Latin and translates as "My Girl", referring to Elaine Orr Thayer, his first wife, and the mother of his only child, Nancy Thayer Andrews. Von Abele considers the poem to be a departure point for the poet from the "witty romanticism" of his early works.

Puella Mea, a very early Cummings poem, was first published in the January 1921 issue of The Dial, and then in Tulips and Chimneys (1923), Cummings' first collection of poetry. In 1949 it was published as a separate book by Golden Eagle Press. The book featured illustrations by Cummings, Paul Klee, Amedeo Modigliani, Pablo Picasso, and Kurt Roesch.

== Title and content ==
The title refers to Catullus 3 that reiterates the words in a less conventional order (meae puellae). The change of word order possibly signifies a distant recollection or is simply an attempt to make the title "more Latin", adding "a certain air of elegance" that is missing in the more boring "My Girl". The poem does not sound at all like Catullus; Baker characterizes it as a blend of Romance and the Song of Solomon, pointing, however, to the line "Eater of all things lovely – Time!" that mimics line 14 of Catullus 3 while substituting Time for Catullus' "Shades of Orcus."

The poem highlights the contrast between the living beauty of Cummings' lady and the now-dead female ideals of the writers of the times past. The first four lines give a sense of the poem's character:

Harun Omar and Master Hafiz
keep your dead beautiful ladies.
Mine is a little lovelier
than any of your ladies were

== Criticism ==
Breen suggests that, excluding the overabundance of "concrete sensuousness of physical detail", there is little to note in this "juvenile in theme" poem. Von Abele, on the contrary, describes the poem as "a delightful piece" where historical allusions to Salome, Tristram, Bagdad, Chaucer and Semiramis maintain the distance between the physical body of the girl being praised and the reader, with the latter prevented from visualizing the core of the presentation,

... her large and shapely thighs
in whose dome the trembling bliss
of a kingdom wholly is ...

through the use of "playful euphuism", commonly found in the English love poetry.

== Sources ==
- MacDonald, Bernard A. (1971). e. e. cummings: A Study of "Epithalamion" and "Puella Mea" (PhD). The University of Connecticut.
- Flinker, Noam (Spring 1980). "Biblical Sexuality as Literary Convention: The Song of Songs in E. E. Cummings' 'Orientale'". Papers on Language and Literature. 16 (2). Edwardsville, Ill.: 184–.
- Baker, Sheridan (March 1959). "Cummings and Catullus". Modern Language Notes. 74 (3): 231–234. doi:10.2307/3040280. ISSN 0149-6611. JSTOR 3040280.
- Ordeman, John T.; Firmage, George J. (October 2000). "Cummings' Titles". Spring. New Series (9). E. E. Cummings Society: 160–170. JSTOR 43915118.
- Buck, R. A. (2011). "When Syntax Leads a Rondo with a Paintbrush: The Aesthetics of E. E. Cummings' 'in Just -' Revisited". Spring: The Journal of the E. E. Cummings Society. 18: 134–159.
- Breen, Stephen (1958). A Catholic Criticism of E. E. Cummings (PDF) (PhD). University of Ottawa.
- Von Abele, Rudolph (December 1955). ""Only to Grow": Change in the Poetry of E. E. Cummings". Publications of the Modern Language Association of America. 70 (5): 913–933. doi:10.2307/459877. eISSN 1938-1530. ISSN 0030-8129. JSTOR 459877. S2CID 251025194.
