= Madame Goldye Steiner =

African-American Jewish female cantor (1889–1960)

- Born: Gladys Mae Sellers; 1889
- Died: 1960 (aged 70–71)

Madame Goldye Steiner (1889–1960) was a pioneering African-American woman cantor.

== Personal life ==
Born in 1889 in Illinois as Gladys Mae Sellers, she grew up in the city of Milwaukee, Wisconsin. By the 1910s, she led musical programs at the St. Mark AME Church and sometimes performed with her husband, Albert Smack. She toured as a singer in concerts throughout Midwestern cities like Milwaukee, Madison, Chicago, and Indianapolis.

In 1922 and 1923, Sellers performed on several WAAK radio station broadcasts in Milwaukee, including performances with John Wickliffe's Ginger Band/Wickliffe's Ginger Orchestra. Around the same time, Sellers was part of the Wisconsin delegation to the "50 Year Jubilee celebration of the Emancipation Proclamation in Chicago".

In the mid-1920s, she moved to New York City and adopted the stage name Madame Goldye Steiner. In 1924, Steiner debuted as a performer of khazones, or cantorial music. According to 2020 research by Henry Sapoznik, she was the only African American woman vocalist performing in the "golden age" of European Jewish liturgical chazzanus vocal music, and only the second female cantor ever recorded. However, Steiner was never formally ordained as a cantor.

A 1925 piece in Pittsburgh's Jewish Criterion newspaper said that "Goldye sings in six languages—Hebrew, Yiddish, Russian, German, French and English." In 1926 she appeared in the Broadway show Lulu Belle, and in 1928 she appeared in e.e. cummings' Broadway play Him. She was also a member of the Actor's Equity Association union.

As with other Black performers, Steiner faced racism in the Yiddish theatre scene. However, as a woman, she also had to deal with kol isha, a religious restriction that did not allow men to hear women sing.

She and her second husband, Richard Armstead, lived near Harlem through the mid-1940s, when they moved back to Milwaukee.

She died in 1960 and was buried in an unmarked grave in Mt. Olivet Cemetery in Milwaukee. However, by 2022, a rematriation project to fund a headstone for Steiner was headed by Shahanna McKinney-Baldon, director of the Edot Midwest Regional Jewish Diversity and Racial Justice Collaborative.
