= William Slater Brown =

American novelist, biographer, and translator of French literature (1896–1997)

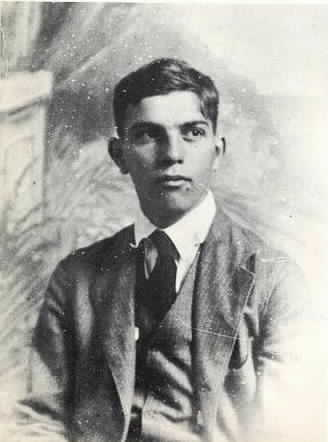
- Born: November 13, 1896; Webster, Massachusetts, U.S.
- Died: June 22, 1997 (aged 100); Rockport, Massachusetts, U.S.
- Occupations: Novelist; biographer; translator
- Spouses: Susan Jenkins; Esther Rosenberg; Mary James (m. 1957; died 1987)
- Children: 2

William Slater Brown (November 13, 1896 – June 22, 1997) was an American novelist, biographer, and translator of French literature. Most notably, he was a friend of the poet E. E. Cummings and is best known as the character "B." in Cumming's 1922 memoir/novel The Enormous Room.

His books, published under the name Slater Brown, include the novel The Burning Wheel (1943); Ethan Allen and the Green Mountain Boys (1956), a biography for children; and The Heyday of Spiritualism (1970), a study of the 19th-century interest in parapsychology and the occult.

== Early life ==
Brown was born to the physician Frederick Augustus Brown and Katharine Slater in the town of Webster, Massachusetts. His great-great grandfather, businessman Samuel Slater, was the chief founder of Webster and is credited with beginning the industrial revolution in the United States with the opening of a textile mill in Pawtucket, Rhode Island, in 1790. Early family wealth disappeared through a series of misfortunes, and Brown and his younger siblings, Fritz, Joyce and Kitty, grew up in relative poverty. From the age of 16, while living with cousins in Boston, the rebellious Brown adopted a life and world philosophy at odds to that of his parents, and he undertook a process of self-discovery that led him to a failed enrollment at Columbia School of Journalism.

== World War I ==
Brown volunteered to serve in the Norton-Harjes Ambulance Corps in early 1917. En route to France aboard the SS La Touraine he met E. E. Cummings. Due to an organizational mix-up, the two spent five weeks together in Paris before assignation to an ambulance unit, during which time they became close friends.

In September 1917 Brown and Cummings were arrested on suspicion of espionage and were imprisoned at the La Ferté-Macé detention camp, Orne, Normandy. Cummings was released in December 1917 after intervention from his father; however, Brown was not released at the same time, and in fact was transferred at that time to a prison in Précigné. Brown was not able to secure his release for three additional months, after which he sailed for New York, where he reunited with Cummings.

== Later life ==
Brown later became part of the bohemian circle of artists and writers in Greenwich Village, New York, contributing articles and reviews to magazines and journals such as New Masses and The Dial. These years were marked by his struggle with alcoholism which he finally overcame in 1947.

During this time he married Susan Jenkins, who was part of the Provincetown Players group, and they had one son, Gwilym Slater Brown (1928–1974). His daughter, Rachel Brown, was born to Esther Rosenberg in 1936. In 1957 he married Mary James (died 1987), the granddaughter of Robertson James and grandniece of Henry James. They resided in Rockport, Massachusetts. William Slater Brown died at age 100 in 1997.

== See also ==
- List of ambulance drivers during World War I
