= EIMI =

1933 book

- Dust jacket of the first edition, 1933
- Author: E. E. Cummings
- Language: English
- Subject: Soviet Union
- Published in: New York
- Publisher: Covici-Friede, Livewright
- Publication date: 1933
- Media type: Travelogue
- Pages: 432

EIMI /eɪˈmiː/ (from the Greek εἰμί, "I am") is a 1933 travelogue by American poet E. E. Cummings about a visit to the Soviet Union in the spring of 1931. The book is written in abstract prose verse.

== Background information ==
EIMI is a 432-page volume recounting the visit of Cummings to Moscow, Kyiv, and Odesa from May 14 to June 14, 1931. Packing a portable typewriter with him, Cummings kept copious notes of his Soviet journey and wrote the book after his return to the United States.

Although a stylized work of non-fiction, Cummings's book was initially touted as a novel by Covici-Friede, a small publisher located in New York City.

In the book, Cummings employs an abstract form of verse comparable to that of Ulysses by James Joyce and uses non-standard sentence structure, punctuation, spacing, and text breaks to evoke a sort of confusion and tension in the reader akin to his own feelings as a non-Russian speaker in the Soviet metropolis.

In Moscow, Cummings meets up with an acquaintance from his days at Harvard University, Henry Wadsworth Longfellow Dana, a committed Communist then living at the Metropole Hotel. Dana showed Cummings around the city and acted as a mentor, attempting—unsuccessfully—to win the apolitical Cummings' sympathies to the Soviet cause before the pair split over political differences. While in Moscow, Cummings also met Joan London, daughter of novelist Jack London, and her husband, the newspaper correspondent Charles Malamuth.

The theme of the work deals with Cummings' growing disappointment with the squalor and inefficiency he saw in the USSR, as well as the lack of intellectual and artistic freedom he observed. In it, he described the Soviet Union as an "uncircus of noncreatures." Lenin's tomb, in which his preserved body is on display, especially revolted Cummings and inspired him to create the most dynamic writing in the book. In tracing the course of his 35-day trip through the Soviet Union, Cummings made frequent allusions to Dante's Inferno and its story of a descent into Hell, equating the two journeys. For some time after the publication of Eimi, Cummings had a difficult time getting his poetry published. The overwhelmingly left-wing publishers of the time refused to accept his work. Cummings had to self-publish several volumes of his work during the later 1930s.

== Reviews ==
EIMI was reckoned to be "a large poem" by a "penguin-Dante" in Marianne Moore's review of the work in Poetry magazine, 1933. Moore judges the book to be an "'enormous dream' about the proletarian fable" in which Cummings shifts grammatical and lyrical styles "as a seal that has been swimming right-side-up turns over and swims on its back for a time."

After being out of print for nearly half a century, EIMI was reissued in 2007 by the New York publisher Liveright. This brought the work to the attention of a new generation of reviewers. For example, Frank Bures of World Hum called the book a "very political travelogue" which "sees the political landscape as integral to the place," thereby getting at "bigger questions about the kind of worlds we create and that create us."

== Editions ==
- First edition: EIMI. New York: Covici-Friede, 1933. —The first printing was 1381 copies signed and numbered.
- Second edition: EIMI: The Journal of a Trip to Russia. New York: William Sloan Associates, n.d. [1949] —Facsimile typography of the first edition; cover title.
- Third edition: EIMI. New York: Grove Press, n.d. [1958].
- Fourth edition: EIMI: A Journey Through Soviet Russia. New York: Liveright, 2007.
