= Since feeling is first =

1926 poem by E. E. Cummings

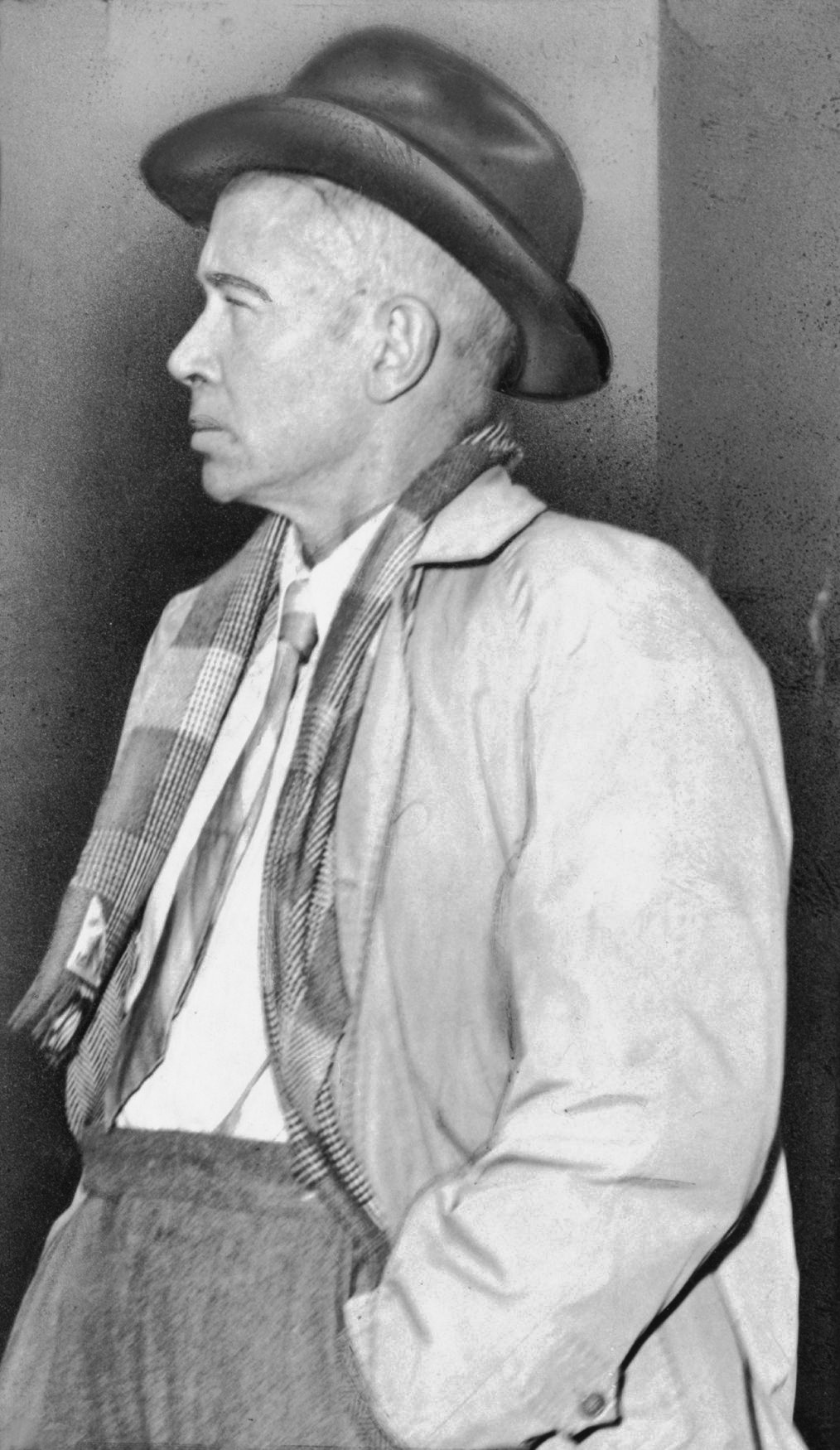
E. E. Cummings, author

"since feeling is first" is a poem written by E. E. Cummings (often stylized as ee cummings). The poem was first published in 1926 in Is 5, a collection of poems published by Boni and Liveright, and, like most Cummings poems, is referred to by its first line. In the collection, the poem is labeled Four VI. The poem is written in Cummings's characteristic style, which lacks traditional orthography and punctuation.

This poem uses an extended metaphor in favor of emotions by negatively equating grammar with thought and rationality. However, there is a kind of irony in the piece, as despite these assertions syntax and grammar are used masterfully.

== Analysis ==
=== Metaphor ===
Critics have noted an underlying tension in the poem between thought and feeling. Literary scholar Milton Cohen writes about how "since feeling is first" compares feeling with positive natural expressions like kisses and laughter while the order of thought is compared with death. Grammar is used as a metaphor to this end, forming the order which represents thought. This triumph of emotion over logic is a tenet of Romanticism and causes some scholars to consider him so. Other scholars have called Cummings a neo-Romantic instead, citing his deliberate use of illogic (as in the title of the collection, Is 5, which stems from the assertion that "two plus two is five").

Moments in this poem support the metaphor of grammar and thought. For instance, in the line "Wholly to be a fool", the homophone 'wholly' is used, implying that to be a fool (i.e., to be unthinking) is to be 'holy'.

"since feeling is first" could be read as an argument against thought and rationality via the metaphorical connection to grammar, where thought is set up as a kind of death which prevents one from feeling (seen in the line "And death i think is no parenthesis"). Scholar William Heyen argues, however, that "since feeling is first" does not argue against rationality, but rather against the total divorce of thought and feeling.

=== Form and syntax ===
"since feeling is first" is composed of five stanzas, the last of which is only one line long. Of the five sections in the book, it is found in the fourth, which contains love poems.

Despite a seeming condemnation of adhering to it, the poem has been noted for its subversion of syntax. Cummings plays with syntax, such as in the lines "Wholly to be a fool/while Spring is in the world/my blood approves", which is syntactically correct but is oddly ordered.

=== Irony ===
A number of the points argued for in the poem exhibit a certain irony. Though the speaker seems to make a case in favor of feeling as opposed to thought, potentially negative words are associated with this theme, including "fool" ("wholly to be a fool") and the highly connotative "fate" ("kisses are a better fate"). Additionally, the speaker "swear[s] by all flowers," although flowers will fade.

Critics have also noted that the poem exhibits a high degree of craftsmanship and makes very specific syntactic decisions in spite of the apparent disdain for language and thought. Some have gone as far as to claim that this disdain is feigned and therefore creates a hyperbolic persona.

Despite the seeming triumph of feeling, the final line of the poem is "And death i think is no parenthesis", rather than "And death i feel is no parenthesis", which adds to the irony of the piece.

== Text ==
since feeling is first
who pays any attention
to the syntax of things
will never wholly kiss you;

wholly to be a fool
while Spring is in the world

my blood approves,
and kisses are a better fate
than wisdom
lady i swear by all flowers. Don't cry
– the best gesture of my brain is less than
your eyelids' flutter which says

we are for each other; then
laugh, leaning back in my arms
for life's not a paragraph

And death i think is no parenthesis

== Recording ==
In 1938, E. E. Cummings made a phonograph recording of several poems, including "since feeling is first", which were to be included in an upcoming collection called Collected Poems. Despite this distribution, the book did not sell well in its time.
