= The Enormous Room =

1922 novel by E. E. Cummings

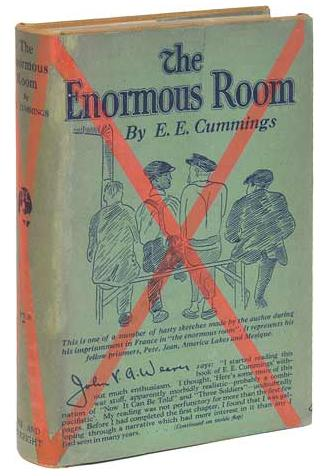
- First edition cover
- Author: E. E. Cummings
- Language: English
- Genre: Autobiographical novel
- Publisher: Boni and Liveright
- Publication date: 1922
- Media type: Print

The Enormous Room (The Green-Eyed Stores) is a 1922 autobiographical novel by the poet and novelist E. E. Cummings about his temporary imprisonment in France during World War I.

== Background ==
Cummings served as an ambulance driver during the war. In late August 1917, his friend and colleague William Slater Brown (known in the book only as B.) was arrested by French authorities as a result of anti-war sentiments B. had expressed in some letters. When questioned, Cummings stood by his friend and was also arrested.

While Cummings was in captivity at La Ferté-Macé, his father received an erroneous letter to the effect that his son had been lost at sea. The cable was later rescinded, but the subsequent lack of information on his son's whereabouts left the elder Cummings distraught.

Meanwhile, Cummings and B. had the bad luck to be transported to La Ferté only five days after the local commissioners in charge of reviewing cases for trial and pardon had left, and the commissioners were not expected back until November. When they finally did arrive, they agreed to allow Cummings, as an official "suspect", a supervised release in the remote commune of Oloron-Sainte-Marie. B. was ordered to be transferred to a prison in Précigné. Before Cummings was to depart, he was unconditionally released from La Ferté due to U.S. diplomatic intervention. He arrived in New York City on January 1, 1918.

== Novel ==
Cummings thus spent over four months in the prison. He met a number of interesting characters and had many picaresque adventures, which he compiled into The Enormous Room. The book is written as a mix between Cummings's well-known unconventional grammar and diction and the witty voice of a young Harvard-educated intellectual in an absurd situation.

The title of the book refers to the large room where Cummings slept beside thirty or so other prisoners. However, it also serves as an allegory for Cummings's mind and his memories of the prison, such that when he describes the many residents of his shared cell, they still live in the "enormous room" of his mind.

== Reception ==
F. Scott Fitzgerald extended praise to the book, saying: "Of all the work by young men who have sprung up since 1920 one book survives—The Enormous Room by e e cummings ... Those few who cause books to live have not been able to endure the thought of its mortality." Both Robert Graves and T. E. Lawrence praised the book in its introduction written for the British edition by Graves.

== Sources ==
- Bloom, Harold, Twentieth-century American Literature, New York: Chelsea House Publishers, 1985–1988. ISBN 978-0-87754-802-7.
