= Santa Claus: A Morality =

1946 play

Santa Claus
- Written by: E. E. Cummings
- Characters: Death; Santa Claus; Mob; Child; Woman
- Original language: English
- Genre: Morality

Premiere
- Date premiered: 1946
- Place premiered: United States

Santa Claus: A Morality (or just Santa Claus) is a play written by 20th-century poet E. E. Cummings in 1946. The play is an allegorical Christmas tale consisting of one act of five scenes. In the play, Santa Claus deals with the increasing materialism and lust for knowledge around him and becomes consumed by it because of Death. However, the love Santa has for his family allows him to reject these things.

The play was inspired by Cummings's daughter Nancy, with whom he was reunited in 1946. It was first published in the Harvard College magazine the Harvard Wake in the spring of 1946.

== Background ==
In 1946, Cummings was able to reunite with his daughter Nancy, who was living in the U.S. and married to Joseph Willard Roosevelt, a grandson of President Theodore Roosevelt. While painting her portrait, he revealed to her, much to her surprise that he was her father. This brought about a fresh relationship between father, daughter, and grandchildren. Because of this, Cummings was inspired to write what is considered his most successful play, Santa Claus, which was an expression of his belief in the joys of love.

== Plot ==
Feeling outdated, Santa Claus allows Death to trade masks with him, Santa representing understanding, Death representing knowledge, or Science. Santa Claus, now a Scientist, makes people believe in the fictional wheelmine and the power of Science. Later, Death, masked as Santa, runs into the real Santa, who is yelling about an accident that occurred at the wheelmine. Death explains that wheelmines, nor people, really exist and then goes on to say that the only way Santa can avoid the angry citizens is to prove that he does not exist.

The people enter, disillusioned by Science, and blame Santa for the accident. A child in the crowd claims that what the mob calls Science is actually Santa Claus, and because the mob does not believe in Saint Nick, he does not exist. To thank Death for his advice, Santa gives up his body. The child returns and notices the change in Santa and they both admit that they are searching for someone they lost.

In the final scene, the woman enters, weeping about how the world has lost all the love due to knowledge. She sees Santa as Death and thinks he is the real Death and she admits that she looks forward to dying. The mob enters to announce the death of Science and the child, Santa, and the woman reunite. Santa takes off the Death mask and they realize the power of love between them.

== Publication and production history ==
Santa Claus was originally published in The Harvard Wake in the spring of 1946 as part of the "Cummings Number". A limited 250-copy signed edition appeared later that year in addition to an unlimited trade edition. The first professional reading of the play was in the early 1960s at the Theatre de Lys in New York City.
