= Edward Cummings (minister) =

American minister and sociologist (1861–1926)

Edward Cummings (April 20, 1861 – November 2, 1926) was an American minister and sociologist.

Edward Cummings was born on April 20, 1861, in Colebrook, New Hampshire, to Frances (Merrill) and Edward Norris Cummings. He received a bachelor's degree in 1883 and a master's degree in 1885, both from Harvard College.

Cummings was originally a professor of sociology at Harvard but left academia to join the ministry. Beginning in October 1900, he was the minister of the "first congregational church", or "south congregational church", in Boston, Massachusetts (likely the First Congregational Church of Hyde Park).

E. E. Cummings was Edward's son.

Cummings died on November 2, 1926, near Ossipee, New Hampshire, while a passenger in a car that was struck by a train.
