= Fairy Tales (Cummings book) =

- First ed. cover
- Author: E. E. Cummings
- Illustrator: John Eaton
- Language: English
- Publisher: Harcourt, Brace
- Publication date: 1965 (first edition)
- Publication place: United States
- Media type: Print
- Pages: 36 p.
- ISBN: 0156298953
- OCLC: 995569446

Fairy Tales is a book of short stories by E. E. Cummings, published posthumously in 1965. It contains four stories: "The Old Man Who Said 'Why'", "The Elephant and the Butterfly", "The House That Ate Mosquito Pie", and "The Little Girl Named I". The book is printed in full color with illustrations by John Eaton.

== Reception ==
Kirkus Reviews gave a positive review, calling the stories "light and sweet". Publishers Weekly likewise gave a positive review, describing the stories as having "warmth and optimism".
