= La Ferté Macé =

- Commune
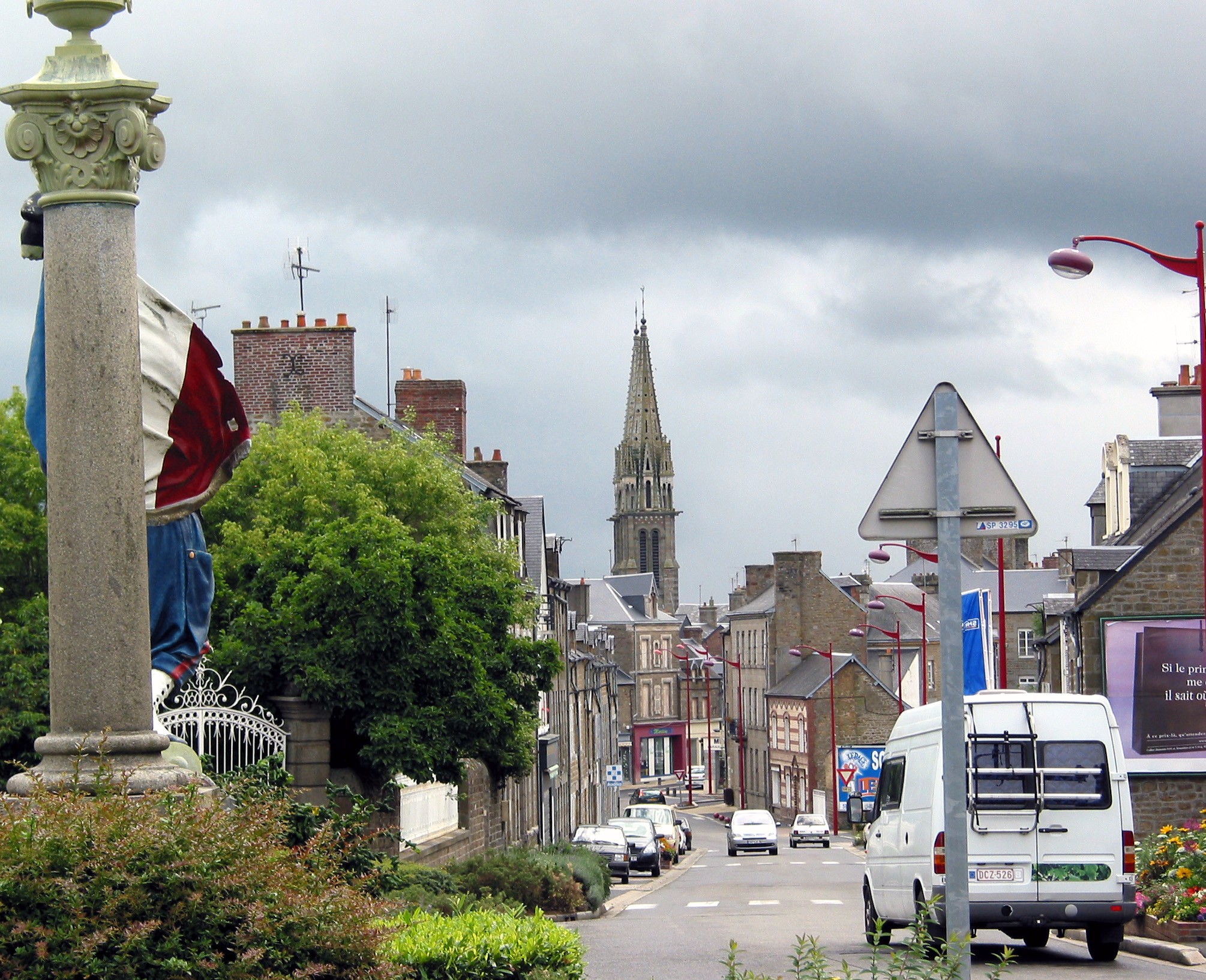
- L'Avenue Thiers; l'église Notre-Dame (church of Our Lady)

- Coat of arms
- Location of La Ferté Macé
- Location within France Location within Normandy
- Coordinates: 48°35′36″N 0°21′22″W
- Country: France
- Region: Normandy
- Department: Orne
- Arrondissement: Argentan
- Canton: La Ferté-Macé
- Intercommunality: CA Flers Agglo

Government
  - Mayor (2020–2026): Michel Leroyer
- Area^{1}: 31.86 km^{2} (12.30 sq mi)
- Highest elevation: 203 m (666 ft)
- Lowest elevation: 165 m (541 ft)
- Population (2023): 5,071
  - Density: 159.2/km^{2} (412.2/sq mi)
- Demonym(s): Fertois, Fertoises
- Time zone: UTC+01:00 (CET)
  - Summer (DST): UTC+02:00 (CEST)
- INSEE/Postal code: 61168 /61600
- Website: www.lafertemace.fr
- ^{1} French Land Register data, which excludes lakes, ponds, glaciers > 1 km^{2} (0.386 sq mi or 247 acres) and river estuaries.

La Ferté Macé (French pronunciation: [la fɛʁte mase]) is a commune in the Orne department, region of Normandy, northwestern France.

== Geography ==
The commune is located within the Normandie-Maine Regional Natural Park.

The commune is made up of the following collection of villages and hamlets, Frilouze, La Tourelle, Fimbrune, La Barbère and Antoigny.

== History ==
=== Middle Ages ===
The Château de la Ferté-Macé was built in the first half of the 11th century on a feudal clod. Geoffrey was the first lord and built this fortress on the order of the Duke of Normandy.

Mathieu (or Macé), who is said to have given his name to the city, was a companion of William the Conqueror in Hastings in 1066; he was one of the first lords of Ferté-Macé.

The fortress gradually became populated by the inhabitants' search for stately protection. It served as a link to the fortified belt protecting the Duchy of Normandy from the potential conquest of its powerful neighbours, the King of France and the Duke of Anjou. With the integration of the Anglo-Norman domain with Anjou, the Plantagenet empire was further strengthened against the King of France.

In 1205, with the conquest of Normandy by King Philippe-Augustus and his attachment to the Kingdom of France, Ferté-Macé became a royal barony. Guillaume de la Ferté, son of Mathieu (another Mathieu) and Gondrède, who had opposed Philippe-Augusteat the time, abandoned his barony and left to join Jean sans Terre in England. The lord of ferté thus becomes the King of France, who entrusts the barony sometimes to a supporter of the Crown, sometimes to a lord administrator of another domain in the name of the King.

In 1386, a criminal trial in Falaise sentenced to death a pig who had eaten the infant of the mason Souvet in the village. Such excommunications of murderous pigs was common in the Middle Ages. Several instances were reported by the city of Rouen alone and their hanging for similar reasons.

=== Early modern period ===
In the 15th century the castle was destroyed. There is only a large square, located in height on the feudal clod; originally called the "Castle Square", it was recently renamed Neustadt-am-Rübenberge square in honour of the German town of Neustadt am Rübenberge, which was twinned with La Ferté-Macé.

Only the bell tower of the Romanesque church, adjoining the great Church of Our Lady, is preserved from medieval times.

Ferté-Macé survived until the 18th century as a small town of around one thousand inhabitants, living in handicrafts and local trade. This craft, already in the form of home weaving, was a precursor to the following century when the city became a major textile centre. In 1869 the Railway station was built in the town.

=== First world war ===
During the First World War, the village housed a military detention camp called the Dépôt de Triage. Among others, the American poet E. E. Cummings and his friend William Slater Brown, then volunteers in the Norton-Harjes Ambulance Corps in France, were held there between 21 September 1917, and 19 December of the same year, on charges of "espionage". This was based on their having expressed anti-war opinions. Cummings' experiences in the camp at La Ferté-Macé were the basis for his novel, The Enormous Room. The three-building complex, with a church and two classroom buildings, had previously served as a seminary and lycée. The prisoners were kept on the top floor of the largest building, which was open and spanned most of the floor.

=== Post war ===
In 1988 the municipality created a 72 hectare lake as a tourist attraction.

On 12 January 2016, the former commune Antoigny was merged into La Ferté-Macé, and the spelling of the new municipality was changed to La Ferté Macé.

== Population ==
The population data given in the table below refer to the commune in its geography as of January 2025.

Historical population
Year	Pop.	±% p.a.
1968	6,368	—
1975	7,041	+1.45%
1982	6,852	−0.39%
1990	7,038	+0.34%
1999	6,797	−0.39%
2007	6,215	−1.11%
2012	5,850	−1.20%
2017	5,237	−2.19%
2023	5,071	−0.54%
Source: INSEE

== Points of Interest ==
- Base de Loisirs Ferté Plage - Is a man made lake covering 72 hectares with beach and water park.

=== Museums ===
- Musée du jouet is a municipal Museum of France dedicated to toys.

=== Gardens ===
- Bleuenn garden is a 1000m² garden that was opened to the public in 1997, featuring over 500 species of plants. The name 'Bleuenn' means little flower in Celtic.
- Ridrel garden is a 1500ha garden that is open to the public, featuring a mix of several styles of garden, English, French, Cottage and contemporary.

=== National heritage sites ===
- Church of Our Lady of the Assumption is a nineteenth century church that was classed as a Monument historique in 1978.

== Transport ==
La Ferté Macé station has rail connections to Argentan and Bagnoles-de-l'Orne.

== Notable people ==
- Jean-Pierre Brisset - (1837 – 1919) a French outsider writer died and was buried here.
- E. E. Cummings - (1894 – 1962), an American poet, painter, essayist, author, and playwright, was held here during World War one for three and a half months in a military detention camp, the Dépôt de Triage.
- Jean-Marie Louvel - (1900 – 1970) a French engineer and politician, was born here.
- Franck Goldnadel - (born 1969) is a French public servant and former director of Paris-Charles de Gaulle Airport, was born here.
- Antoine Goulard (born 1985) - a professional footballer who was born here.
- Églantine Rayer (born 2004) - a French professional racing cyclist was born here.

== Twin towns ==
- Ludlow, Shropshire, England
- Savoigne, Senegal
- Neustadt am Rübenberge, Germany
- Saint-Maurice, Quebec, Canada

== Heraldry ==
Arms of La Ferté-Macé	The arms of La Ferté-Macé are blazoned : Gules, a beehive and a shuttle bendwise sinister Or.

== See also ==
- Communes of the Orne department
- Parc naturel régional Normandie-Maine
