= Is 5 =

1926 collection of poetry

is 5
- by E. E. Cummings
- First edition (publ. Boni & Liveright)
- First published in: 1926
- Country: United States
- Language: English
- Publisher: Boni & Liveright

Full text
- is 5 at Wikisource

is 5 is a collection of poetry by E. E. Cummings, published in 1926. It contains 88 poems, divided into five sections.

The collection includes a number of satirical and anti-war poems, perhaps influenced by Cummings' time spent as an ambulance driver in France during the First World War. Notable poems from the collection are "my sweet old etcetera" and "since feeling is first".
