= CIOPW =

1931 collection of artwork

CIOPW is a collection of artwork by E. E. Cummings published in 1931. The title is an acronym made from the initial letters of the five media Cummings used to produce the collection: charcoal, ink, oil, pencil, and watercolours.

CIOPW contains 99 works, 27 of which are drawings and 72 of which are paintings. Since it is Cummings' art and not his words that are on display, the title is also to be read as the ancient Greek word σιωπῶ ('I am silent'} with (i) a so-called lunate sigma, (ii) iota, (iii) an omicron, (iv) a pi rather than a "Ρ" (rho) to keep the sound the same, and (v) an accented omega to represent "W" visually. The title should thus be pronounced "see-ô-pô", with the stress on the last syllable. Compare his other Greek titles EIMI = εἰμί ('I am'); and XAIPE = χαῖρε (pronounced "chaire," with a guttural ch), "greetings, be well".
