= Antoigny =

- Part of La Ferté-Macé
- Location of Antoigny
- Location within France Location within Normandy
- Coordinates: 48°31′30″N 0°21′53″W
- Country: France
- Region: Normandy
- Department: Orne
- Arrondissement: Argentan
- Canton: Magny-le-Désert
- Commune: La Ferté-Macé
- Area^{1}: 4.82 km^{2} (1.86 sq mi)
- Elevation: 150 m (490 ft)
- Highest elevation: 222 m (728 ft)
- Lowest elevation: 138 m (453 ft)
- Population (2023): 120
  - Density: 25/km^{2} (64/sq mi)
- Time zone: UTC+01:00 (CET)
  - Summer (DST): UTC+02:00 (CEST)
- Postal code: 61410
- ^{1} French Land Register data, which excludes lakes, ponds, glaciers > 1 km^{2} (0.386 sq mi or 247 acres) and river estuaries.

Antoigny (French pronunciation: [ɑ̃twaɲi]) is a former commune in the Orne department in northwestern France. On 12 January 2016, Antoigny was annexed by the commune of La Ferté-Macé. The inhabitants are known as Antoniaciens.

== See also ==
- Communes of the Orne department
- Parc naturel régional Normandie-Maine
