= Buffalo Bill's (poem) =

1920 poem

- by E. E. Cummings
- Country: United States
- Language: English
- Publisher: The Dial
- Publication date: 1920

"Buffalo Bill's" is a poem by E. E. Cummings, first published in 1920 by The Dial.

== History ==
The poem tells a short story of Buffalo Bill, a "blue eyed boy" who rides a stallion before being overtaken by "Mister Death".

Despite initial assumptions, the identity of Buffalo Bill in the story is unrelated to that of the American soldier of the same name, who died three years before the poem was published. Academic Thomas Dilworth stated that the poem includes pederastic connotations.
