= Antoine Goulard =

French footballer (born 1985)

Personal information
- Date of birth: 18 December 1985 (age 40)
- Place of birth: La Ferté-Macé, France
- Height: 1.87 m (6 ft 1 1/2 in)
- Position: Defender

Team information
- Current team: Hanoi T&T F.C.
- Number: 85

Youth career
- 2003–2005: ES Fréjus

Senior career*
Years	Team	Apps	(Gls)
2003–2007	ES Fréjus	82	(3)
2007–2009	Dijon FCO	40	(3)
2009–2012	FC Rouen	64	(3)
2015–2016	Hanoi T&T F.C.		
2016-2018	R.E. Virton		
2018-2019	FC UNA Strassen		
- * Club domestic league appearances and goals

Antoine Goulard (born 18 December 1985) is a French professional footballer.

== Career ==
After terminating his contract with Dijon FCO the 24-year-old defender joined to FC Rouen.
