= Tulips and Chimneys =

1923 poetry collection by E. E. Cummings

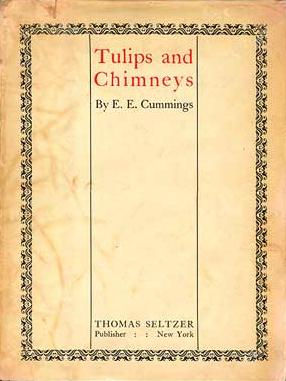
- First edition cover
- Author: E. E. Cummings
- Publisher: Thomas Seltzer
- Publication date: 1923
- Pages: 125
- OCLC: 906167871

Tulips and Chimneys is the first collection of poetry by E. E. Cummings, published in 1923.

== Description ==
This collection is the first dedicated exclusively to poems by Cummings; his work had been published previously alongside others' in Eight Harvard Poets.

Though most now know the title to be Tulips & Chimneys (with an ampersand), Cummings's original title request was disregarded by the publisher Thomas Seltzer, who changed the ampersand to the word "and." Eventually, the book would come to be published together with the collection "&", under Cummings's original title.

Tulips and Chimneys features, among others, the poems "All in green went my love riding", "Thy fingers make early flowers of", "Buffalo Bill's", and "Puella Mea". The original manuscript contained 152 poems of which only 86 appeared in this volume. Of the other poems, 41 later appeared in XLI Poems, and the balance (along with 34 new poems) were privately printed by the author in the simply named "&" in 1925.

== Links ==
- Tulips and Chimneys Cummings.ee
