= Him (Cummings play) =

1927 three-act play by E.E. Cummings

- Original language: English
- Written by: E. E. Cummings
- Characters: There are 105 characters See Characters section below
- Genre: Absurdism; Surrealism

Premiere
- Date: April 19, 1928
- Place: Provincetown Playhouse

Him is a three-act play written by poet E.E. Cummings. The play was first published in November 1927 and premiered in New York during the spring of 1928. Him is sometimes called a precursor to Theatre of the Absurd but has also been described as being surrealistic and in the German expressionist tradition. It is heavily influenced by Freudian psychology as well as popular culture of the 1920s.

== Background ==
Cummings wrote Him in Paris and New York. He said of Him, that "the book was probably published soon after the play had finished itself." Cummings had been living in France on and off for most of the 1920s; his time in Paris inspired Act III, Scene III of Him, which takes place at the Parisian restaurant, Au Père Tranquille (Les Halles).

Him began as a play about a woman named Anna, a playwright named Edward, and Jan, a man who in earliest drafts of the play was a janitor. Around 1926, the play became Him as it exists in its current form.

=== Inspiration and sources ===
Him is stylistically indebted to vaudeville, circus, burlesque, German expressionism, surrealism, cubism, satire, and Dada. The face-in-the-hole board that reoccurs in the Ms. Weird scenes is a vaudeville device. Just before writing Him, Cummings read Sigmund Freud's Introduction to Psychoanalysis and Totem and Taboo. Him is heavily influenced by Freudian psychoanalysis.

Some critics, including Charles Norman and Robert E. Maurer, believe the character of Him is representative of Cummings himself.

Act two, scene four is a parody of Eugene O'Neill's The Great God Brown. Act two, scene five is a bawdy parody of the Frankie and Johnny song and is also inspired by minstrelsy.

Act two, scene eight shares many resonances with Cummings' 1926 Vanity Fair article "How I Do Not Love Italy" in which Cummings compares Benito Mussolini to both Caesar and Napoleon. The scene is also inspired by and possibly mocking of Bert Savoy, a gay drag and burlesque entertainer who performed at the Old Howard Theatre where the scene is set. The fairy characters in this scene are especially based on Savoy.

== The theatre program at the premier performance ==
The program for the premier performance at the Provincetown Playhouse lists the title of the play in lower case letters, him. Which is how it sometimes occurs in print, though it often is printed in books and articles with an uppercase initial letter, Him. After the title, the program describes the play as "a PLAY in III acts & 21 scenes". The program also contains a program note written by Cummings:

(WARNING: him isn't a comedy or a tragedy or a farce or a melodrama or a revue or an operetta or a moving picture or any other convenient excuse for "going to the theatre" — in fact, it's a PLAY, so let it PLAY with you. Let it dart off and beckon to you from the distance, let it tiptoe back and snap its fingers under your nose, let it sweep up at you from below or pounce down on you from above, let it creep cautiously behind you and tap you on the back of the neck, let it go all around and over and under you and inside you and through you. Relax, and give this PLAY a chance to strut its stuff—relax, don't worry because it's not like something else — relax, stop wondering what it's all "about"— like many strange and familiar things, Life included, this PLAY isn't "about," it simply is. Don't try to despise it, let it try to despise you. Don't try to enjoy it, let it try to enjoy you. DON'T TRY TO UNDERSTAND IT, LET IT TRY TO UNDERSTAND YOU).

Cummings expressed his ideas regarding art and theatre in a series of essays around the time that him was produced, and also in the program note or "warning" he wrote for the production at the Provincetown Playhouse: Art is not a reference to something, instead it is something — it is "the cordial revelation of the fatal reflexive." This follows Coleridge's beliefs that nature is not the result of a process, instead nature is in process. As Cummings says in the program: "This PLAY isn't 'about,' it simply is." Form and content are not two separate things. In the theatre, this vision sees the audience and the play each confronting and interacting with the other.

== Plot ==
Him can be called one of the first successful attempts of Theatre of the Absurd, and thus lacks plot in the traditional sense.

The first scene depicts a painted backdrop of a doctor anaesthetizing a woman with two face holes, in which are Me and The Doctor; facing this are three figures knitting in rocking chairs and having absurd conversations. This type of scene happens six times during the play, always following or preceded by scenes in the "room". The room scenes feature Me and Him conversing.

The second act of Him features nine scenes from the play Him is writing. The final act returns to scenes in the "room" and the Weirds scenes but also adds in a scene in a Parisian restaurant and a scene at a freak show, the latter of which ends by revealing the ninth freak to be Me holding a baby. The play ends with Me breaking the fourth wall quite literally by revealing that the fourth wall of Me and Him's living room is not real. Me says that she can see people "pretending that this room and [Him and Me] are real". Him cannot believe what she is saying, although he wishes he could.

=== Structure ===
Act 1 alternates between scenes with the three Miss Weirds and scenes in Me and Him's room, beginning and ending with the Weird scenes. The third act contains a similar Him-Me/misses Weird alternating structure but with the addition of the Au Père Tranquil scene (3.3) the Freak Show scene (3.6).

Cummings does not follow any sort of traditional dramatic structure. Some critics argue that Him is structured around the dreams of the character Me.

== Analysis ==
=== Themes ===
==== Birth/Creation ====
Him makes use of many references to birth and pregnancy. Several characters give birth, are born or undergo a pregnancy of sorts in Him. The Gentleman (played by the Doctor) is reborn at the end of Act 3. The main issue in Me and Him's relationship is Me's pregnancy and she is shown with her baby at the climax of the Freak Show in Act 3. Him's act of creating a play is also a birth of sorts.

==== Art ====
Him describes the artist as "a human being who balances three chairs, one on top of another, on a wire, eighty feet in air with no net underneath, and then climbs into the top chair, sits down, and begins to swing....". The metatheatre of act two, especially in the form of the dialogues between Me and Him following each scene, forces the audience to reconcile with the nature of theatre, and by extension, art itself.

==== Reality and illusion ====
Him requires that "the audience and play be able to confront and interact with one another". The play's meta-theatrical middle act and fourth-wall-breaking ending confront the nature of the theatre as both illusory and real. Him says of his play that it is "all about mirrors". Him contains several mirrors and mirror-references. Because the room in which the Me/Him scenes take place rotates, the mirror through which Me looks at the audience literally becomes a window.

=== Psychoanalysis ===
Many critics have read Him through the lenses of Freudian and Jungian psychoanalysis. The psychology of Him is largely Freudian but has Jungian overtones. In act 1, scene 5 the third Miss Weird says "By reading the gospel according to Saint Freud." Additionally, the Englishman in act 2, scene 6 carries a large trunk on his back which he says is his unconscious. These are just two of the numerous Freudian inspired instances in Cummings' play.

Richard Kennedy claims that in early drafts of Him, Cummings' was attempting to "present Freudian ideas in symbolic action." Edward, the character who later became Him, was representative of the conscious or ego.

== Characters ==
Him has one hundred and five characters.

=== Main characters ===
Him: A would-be playwright, referred to as "Mr. Anybody" and "Marquise de la Poussière" in 2.1; Him plays the Interlocutor in 2.9

Me: Him's lover; Me appears as the final 'freak' in the Freak Show of act 3, scene 6 simply as herself holding a baby

The Doctor: A doctor; The Doctor plays the Third Middle-Aged Man (George) in 2.2, a Soap Box Orator in 2.3, an Intruder in 2.4, a Personage (John Rutter) in 2.5, a Plainclothesman in 2.6, the Questioning Passenger in 2.7, Mussolini in 2.8, the Gentleman in 2.9 and 3.3, and One Voice/Barker in 3.5 and 3.6.

The Three Miss Weirds: Ms. Stop, Ms. Look, and Ms. Listen sit knitting in their rocking chairs with their backs facing the audience for most of the play. They are likely representative of the three fates.

=== Speaking characters in Him's play (Act 2) ===
All the characters in the play-within-the-play, with the exception of those played by The Doctor and Him, return as spectators at the Freak Show of act 3, scene 6.

Scene 2: Three Middle-Aged Men, Virgo, Porter

Scene 3: A Soap Box Orator, Ten people who stop, look, and listen, Nineteen people who go their separate ways

Scene 4: Will, Bill, an Intruder

Scene 5: Male, Female, Six Coalblack Figures, Nine Players, a Personage, Negress (Frankie)

Scene 6: Plainclothesman, Englishman, Cop

Scene 7: Two Passengers

Scene 8: Ethiopian, Two Centurions, Four Fairies (Claud, Tib, Con, and Gus), Mussolini (whom the other characters refer to as Caesar, though he is dressed as Napoleon), Fascist, Messenger

Scene 9: Gentleman, Interlocutor, Shape, Second Shape, Woman, Old Woman, This Shape, Whore, Fourth Shape, Mother with a Child, Voice, Another Voice, Girl's Voice, A Dark Voice, Policeman

=== Other characters ===
Characters At Au Père Tranquille (Les Halles) (3.3): Vestaire, Chasseur, Blond Gonzesse, Waiter, Headwaiter, Gentleman (played by The Doctor), Him, Youthful Woman (Alice), Elderly Woman (Lucy), Older Woman (Sally), Fairly Young Woman, Will, Bill, A Whore

The Freaks in The Freak Show (3.6): the Nine Foot Giant, the Queen of Serpents, the Human Needle, the Missing Link, the Tattooed Man, the Six Hundred Pounds of Passionate Pulchritude, the King of Borneo, and the Eighteen Inch Lady, Princess Anankay (who is Me holding a newborn baby in her arms)

== Publication and production history ==
Him is unusual in that it was published in book form before its first performance.

=== Publication ===
Cummings originally gave Him to the literary agency, Brandt and Brandt for publication. At the recommendation of Cummings' friend Marianne Moore, who was then the managing editor at The Dial, six scenes from Him (Act I, Scene 2; Act II Scene 6; and Act III, Scenes 1, 5, and 6) were published in The Dial in August 1927. The excerpts in The Dial were accompanied by an abstract painting by Cummings, Noise Number 13.

Him was published in its entirety by Boni and Liveright in November 1927. Early critics assumed that the play was a closet drama and, until its first performance in the spring of 1928, thought it would remain as such.

Cummings dedicated Him with an epigraph to his then wife, Anne Barton. The jacket of the first edition contained "An Imaginary Dialogue Between the Author and a Public as Imagined by E. E. Cummings" and "A Statement to a Certain Public by a Certain Publisher". The former was written by Cummings himself, while the later was written by editor Isidor Schneider who at the time worked in the advertising department of Boni and Liveright.

=== Productions ===
At the suggestion of Henry Alsberg, the Provincetown Players worked with Cummings and set designer Eugene Fitsch to bring the scale of Him down to something manageable for the small company. Several scenes were cut from the play and the 105 characters were performed by a cast of 30. Cummings himself went to rehearsals and aided the actors in bringing his difficult drama to life. Him premiered on April 19, 1928, in New York City at the Provincetown Playhouse. This production was directed by James Light and starred Erin O'Brien-Moore as Me, William S. Johnstone as Him, and Lawrence Bolton as The Doctor. Him was forced to close after twenty-seven performances due to budget constraints. Though the critics denounced Him, the play nonetheless attracted large crowds, often playing to full houses of 200 people. The production ultimately made no money.

Premiere cast

- Erin O'Brien-Moore as Me
- William S. Johnsone as Him
- Lawrence Bolton as The Doctor
- Della Mounts as First Weird
- Sara Floyd as Second Weird
- Virginia Rose as Third Weird, Old Woman
- Stanley Zipser as First Drunk, one of the Black Figures, Third Fairy, Second Shape
- George Bratt as Second Drunk, one of the Black Figures, an Englishman, Second Fairy, Fourth Shape, Headwaiter
- Louise Bradley as Virgo, one of the Black Figures, First Shape, Vestaire
- Hemsley Winfield as Porter, Male Black Figure, Ethiopian, King of Borneo
- Phillip Frank as Will, Second Centurion
- Jack Daniels as Bill, Third Shape
- Goldye Steiner as Female Black Figure
- Christine Cooper as Frankie, Elderly Woman
- Henry Rosenberg as one of the Black Figures, a Fascist, Missing Link
- Evelyn Hill as one of the Black Figures, A Blond Gonzesse
- Ida Ismena as one of the Black Figures
- Adele Gilber as one of the Black Figures
- Lionel J. Stander as a Cop, First Fairy
- Herbert T. Bergman as Second Passenger, Fourth Fairy
- Morton Russel as First Centurion, Tattooed Man
- Leo Francis Ruttle as Messenger, Chasseur
- Virginia Dale as Woman, A Fairly Young Woman, Eighteen Inch Lady (with Madeleine Ray)
- Alice Swanson as A Whore
- Edith Frisbie as Mother with a Child, Queen of Serpents
- Arthur William Row as A Policeman, Waiter
- Ruth Chorpenning as An Older Woman
- Marion Johnson as A Youthful Woman
- Ora Laddon as A Whore
- George Spelvin as Nine Foot Giant
- Heaton Vorse as Human Needle, Musician
- Mary Jones as Six Hundred Pounds of Passionate Pulchritude
- Madeleine Ray as Eighteen Inch Lady (with Virginia Dale)
- Musicians: Gustav Saferas, Allan Sheldon

Premiere crew

- James Light — Director
- Theodore Viehman — Assistant director
- Eugene Fitsch — Set and costume designer
- Herbert T. Bergman — Stage Manager
- Edward Allan Ziman — Music arranger and director
- Nellie Duff Reade — Costume maker
- Robert Fuller — Mask maker

The Provincetown Players went on to perform Him again in 1948 this time directed by Irving Stiver and starring Janet Shannon, John Denny, and Gene Saks.

Mary Virginia Heinlein directed Him twice within a period of twenty years at Vassar College in Poughkeepsie, New York with the Vassar Experimental Theater Group. The 1944 production starred Olive Robbins as Him and Katherine Em Wright as Me, while the 1957 production starred Ron Mills as Him, Carlyn Cahill as Me, and Mary Patton as The Doctor.

In 1950, Him made its European debut in Salzburg, Austria as directed by Eric Bentley.

Him has been performed in New York City outside the Provincetown Playhouse several times including the 1974 off-Broadway performance by the Circle Repertory Theatre. Circle Repertory Theatre's production was directed by Marshal Oglesby and starred Trish Hawkins, Lanford Wilson, and Neil Flanagan, with costumes by Jennifer von Mayrhauser.

Other New York City performances include The Rectangle Theatre's 1956 performance, Medicine Show's 1991 performance directed by Barbara Vann, the Hyperion Theatre Group's 1983 performance, and 2008's performance by The Longest Lunch who framed their production "as Cummings' explanation to his daughter of his paternal failings".

Him has also been performed by The Theater Company of Boston in 1964, by the theatre group at the University of California, Berkeley in 1969, and by Viaduct Theater in 2005.

Him is so rarely performed that in his series of 'non-lectures' at Harvard, delivered during the 1952-53 school-year as part of the Charles Eliot Norton professorship, Cummings said he was "sure that most of you [the lecture's audience] have neither perused nor beheld a drama whose loving nonhero and lovely heroine are called Him and Me".

== Critical response ==
Following the critical confusion surrounding the Provincetown 1928 production, the Provincetown Players published a pamphlet entitled "him AND the CRITICS". This pamphlet was a collection of critical reactions to the play and contained an introduction by Gilbert Seldes. In Wm. Rose Benét's review, published in "him AND the CRITICS", he says that Him "both infuriates and puzzles". Alan Dale of the New York American called Him "piffle" and said that he had "no positive idea of the trend of the precious thing".

Him's early critics claimed the play lacked structure, meaning, sense, and message. John Hyde Preston said of Him that it "is not a play at all, but a mess of formless talk with not a very clear idea behind it". L. W. Payne Jr., who in a review of a Him as a book claimed Him was a closet drama, said, after seeing the Provincetown Players' production, that Him "is a drama sui generis".

In his review of the Provincetown production of Him, Edmund Wilson of The New Republic called it "the outpouring of an intelligence, a sensibility, and an imagination of the very first dimension." Of the same production, Harold Clurman of Nation wrote, "the play's purest element is contained in duos of love. They are the most sensitive and touching in American playwriting. Their intimacy and passion, conveyed in an odd exquisiteness of writing, are implied rather than declared. We realize that no matter how much 'him' wishes to express his closeness to 'me,' he is frustrated not only by the fullness of his feeling but by his inability to credit his emotion in a world as obscenely chaotic as the one in which he is lost."

After seeing the 1944 Vassar production of Him, Mr. and Mrs. Ludwig Kahn remarked that Him was "an interesting and stimulating, sometimes irritatingly challenging performance."
