= Henry Sapoznik =

American musician (born 1953)

Henry "Hank" Sapoznik (Yiddish: הענעך סאַפּאָזשניק; born 1953, in Brooklyn, New York) is an American author, record and radio producer and performer of traditional Yiddish and American music.

== Career ==
With MacArthur Fellow David Isay, Sapoznik produced the 10-week radio series the "Yiddish Radio Project" on the history of Jewish broadcasting for NPR’s All Things Considered in the spring of 2002. The series won the prestigious Peabody Award for Excellence in Broadcast Journalism for 2002.

A pioneering scholar and performer of klezmer music, Sapoznik was the first director of the Max and Frieda Weinstein Archives of Recorded Sound at the YIVO Institute for Jewish Research, from its founding in 1982, until 1994. As an outgrowth of that work, in 1985 Sapoznik started "KlezKamp: The Yiddish Folk Arts Program", the world's most important training venue for practitioners of this nearly lost art and, in 1994, founded the Yiddish arts organization "Living Traditions" to administer it. His book Klezmer! Jewish Music from Old World to Our World (1999) was the winner of the 2000 ASCAP Deems Taylor Award for Excellence in Music Scholarship. In 2020, he published pioneering research on the previously hidden life of Madame Goldye Steiner, the first African-American female cantor.

A four-time Grammy nominated performer/producer, Sapoznik has recorded and/or produced over 35 recordings of traditional Yiddish and American music. Nominated for a 2002 Emmy Award for his music score to the documentary film, The Life and Times of Hank Greenberg. His 2005 3-CD anthology of country music pioneer Charlie Poole for Sony Columbia Legacy was nominated for three Grammy awards (Best Historical Album, Best Album Notes, Best Box Design). In 2007, he co-produced the 3-CD reissue anthology People Take Warning! Murder Ballads and Disaster Songs 1913–1938 with Christopher King and authored the notes, which was nominated for a 2008 Grammy award for Best Historical Album. His most recent project with co-producer King is the 2 CD reissue box set Ernest V. Stoneman: The Unsung Father of Country Music 1925–1934 for 5 String Productions (2008). He co-produced, with Sherry Mayrent and Christopher King, the 3-CD compilation Cantors, Klezmorim and Crooners 1905–1953: Classic Yiddish 78s from the Mayrent Collection. In his Wall Street Journal review, Nat Hentoff calls Sapoznik a "fount of historical and anecdotal knowledge of Yiddish culture and history". He plays banjo and autoharp on Kevin Burke's 1977 album Sweeney's Dream.

Sapoznik was one of the founding members of the klezmer ensemble Kapelye. Friction between him and bandmembers led to his departure.

Sapoznik was the director of the Mayrent Institute for Yiddish Culture at the University of Wisconsin–Madison, 2011-2018, and was also the donor of the Henry Sapoznik collection (AFC 2010/003), which includes photos, over 1400 sound recordings (most are instantaneous discs), and manuscript materials documenting Yiddish-American radio, at the American Folklife Center, Library of Congress.
