= William Johnstone (actor) =

American radio and screen actor (1908–1996)

- Johnstone in the trailer for Down Three Dark Streets (1953)
- Born: William S. Johnstone; 1908; New York City, U.S.
- Died: November 1, 1996 (aged 87–88); New York City, U.S.
- Occupation: Actor
- Years active: 1927–1978
- Spouse(s): Georgia Brady Johnstone (m. 19??)
- Children: 1

William S. Johnstone (1908 – November 1, 1996) was an American radio and screen actor. He is best known for his voice work as the title character on The Shadow for five seasons from 1938–1943.

== Early years ==
William S. Johnstone was born and raised in Brooklyn, New York City, to a Scottish-born father and a German-born mother. Some newspaper publicity said he was born in Paisley, Renfrewshire, Scotland, and came to the United States at age three. He worked as a newspaper reporter before he became an actor.

== Career ==
Johnstone as the Shadow

Johnstone acted on stage with the Theatre Guild at the beginning of his career, appearing in a number of bit parts. He had supporting roles in 1927 in Fog-Bound and The Manhatters. In 1928, he played the title role in Him, written by E.E. Cummings. Cummings later commented, "William Johnstone made a marvelously attractive unhero ..." He also appeared that year in a lead role in Kate Clugston's These Days.

In 1938, he was selected over 45 other actors to replace Orson Welles as The Shadow on radio. He also starred as Ben Guthrie in the radio version of The Lineup, and became one of the most prolific radio actors of his time, with many supporting roles. He had a memorable role in the ".22 Rifle for Christmas" episode of Dragnet on radio, and reprised it on the television series. In film, he portrayed John Jacob Astor IV in Titanic, and had a supporting role in Down Three Dark Streets. He played Judge James T. Lowell in As The World Turns on television in a long run from 1956 to 1978.

Johnstone's other roles in radio included those shown in the table below.

Program	Character
The Casebook of Gregory Hood	Sanderson "Sandy" Taylor
Five Star Jones	Editor
Inspector Mark Sabre	Mark Sabre
Maudie's Diary	Maudie's father
Mrs. Wiggs of the Cabbage Patch	Bob Redding
The New Adventures of Nero Wolfe	Inspector Cramer
Pepper Young's Family	Sam Young
Six-Gun Justice	Jim Dance
Valiant Lady	Jim Barrett
The Whistler	The Whistler
Wilderness Road	Simon Weston
The Woman from Nowhere	Eric Wolfe

He also had supporting roles in Pursuit, Nick Carter, Master Detective, Calamity Jane and Woman from Nowhere.

== Personal life ==
Johnstone was married to Georgia Brady Johnstone, a former dancer who became friend and secretary to his The Shadow co-star Agnes Moorehead.

== Filmography ==
Year	Title	Role	Notes
1948	All My Sons	Attorney	Uncredited
1948	The Decision of Christopher Blake	President's Aide in Dream	Uncredited
1948	Enchantment	Narrator	Voice
1950	Military Academy with That Tenth Avenue Gang	Col. Jamison	
1950	The Magnificent Yankee	Lawyer	Uncredited
1951	Half Angel	Minister	Uncredited
1951	My Favorite Spy	Prentice	Uncredited
1953	Titanic	John Jacob Astor	
1953	Beneath the 12-Mile Reef	Crewman of 'Snapper'	Uncredited
1954	Riding Shotgun	Col. Flynn	
1954	Down Three Dark Streets	FBI Chief Frank Pace	
