= The Lineup (radio series) =

American radio police drama (1950–1953)

Wally Maher and Bill Johnstone

The Lineup is a half-hour American radio police drama that was broadcast on CBS from July 6, 1950, until February 20, 1953. It began as a summer replacement for The FBI in Peace and War. A year after the program ended, a successful television version debuted, followed by a feature film.

== Premise ==
Following a trend begun by the radio series Dragnet, The Lineup strove to portray realism in a police drama. The title indicated the show's focus, as each story began and ended with a lineup of suspects in a police station in San Francisco. Sergeant Matt Grebb, who was heard giving instructions to participants in each lineup, was "quick-tempered and often bored", while his boss, Lieutenant Ben Guthrie, was "soft-spoken and calm." The program portrayed most activities of the police as part of the job with "few heroics". Episodes were "fast, furious, and realistic."

Each episode began with the announcer saying:

Ladies and gentlemen, we take you behind the scenes at a police headquarters in a great American city where, under glaring lights, will pass before us the innocent, the vagrant, the thief, the murderer. This is The Lineup.

== On-air personnel ==
Bill Johnstone portrayed Guthrie. Joseph Kearns initially portrayed Grebb, with Wally Maher taking that role beginning in 1951. Guthrie and Grebb were the only two regular characters on the program. The announcers were Clarence Cassell, Dan Cubberly, Bob LeMond, Charles Lyon, Bob Stevenson, and Joe Walters.

== Production ==
Elliott Lewis directed the program in 1950; Jaime del Valle replaced him and produced the show. Writers included E. Jack Neuman, Gil Doud, Milton Geiger, Charles E. Israel, Gene Levitt, David M. Light, Sydney Marshall, Richard Quine, William J. Ratcliff, Morton Fine, David Friedkin, and Blake Edwards. Edwards and del Valle rode with police and sat in on real-life lineups, and del Valle read "about a dozen newspapers a day" in search of material that could be adapted for episodes. Eddie Dunstedter composed and conducted the music.

The series was usually sustaining but at times was sponsored by Plymouth dealers, Wrigley's Spearmint gum, and The U.S. Army and U.S. Air Force recruiting Service.

== Critical response ==
A review of the premiere episode in the trade publication Variety said that "aside from the lineup angle ... [the episode] hewed to the traditional whodunit pattern." The review complimented the "compact script" and "tight direction" that enabled the story to progress "in a suspenseful manner, without telegraphing the denouement".

== Scripts ==
Scripts of episodes of The Lineup and printed material related to other old-time radio programs are held in the KNX Collection at the University of California, Santa Barbara Library.
