= World Hum =

- Website type: travel website
- Available in: English
- Owner: Travel Channel
- Creators: Jim Benning and Michael Yessis
- Editors: Jim Benning and Eva Holland
- Website: www.worldhum.com
- Commercial: Yes
- Launched: 2001
- Current status: Acquired in May 2007 by Travel Channel

World Hum is an online travel magazine. Founded in 2001 by Jim Benning and Michael Yessis, Worldhum.com was acquired in May 2007, by Travel Channel.

World Hum features a Travel Blog, How To's, Book Reviews, Q&A, and travel dispatches. The focus of the online magazine is to focus not on the destinations, but on travel in the general sense of the word.
