= The Lineup (book) =

2009 book by Otto Penzler

The Lineup: The World's Greatest Crime Writers Tell the Inside Story of Their Greatest Detectives
- Author: Otto Penzler
- Genre: Biographies
- Published: 2009
- Publisher: Little, Brown and Company
- Pages: 407
- Awards: Edgar Award (2010)
- ISBN: 978-0-316-03193-6
- Website: The Lineup

The Lineup: The World's Greatest Crime Writers Tell the Inside Story of Their Greatest Detectives (ISBN 978-0-316-03193-6) is a 2009 book written by Otto Penzler and published by Little, Brown and Company (now owned by Hachette Book Group) on 10 November 2009 which later went on to win the Edgar Award for Best Critical / Biographical Work in (2010).

== Critical reception ==
Kirkus Reviews, "An all-star cast produces a mostly rewarding collection."
