= Précigné =

Précigne
- Commune
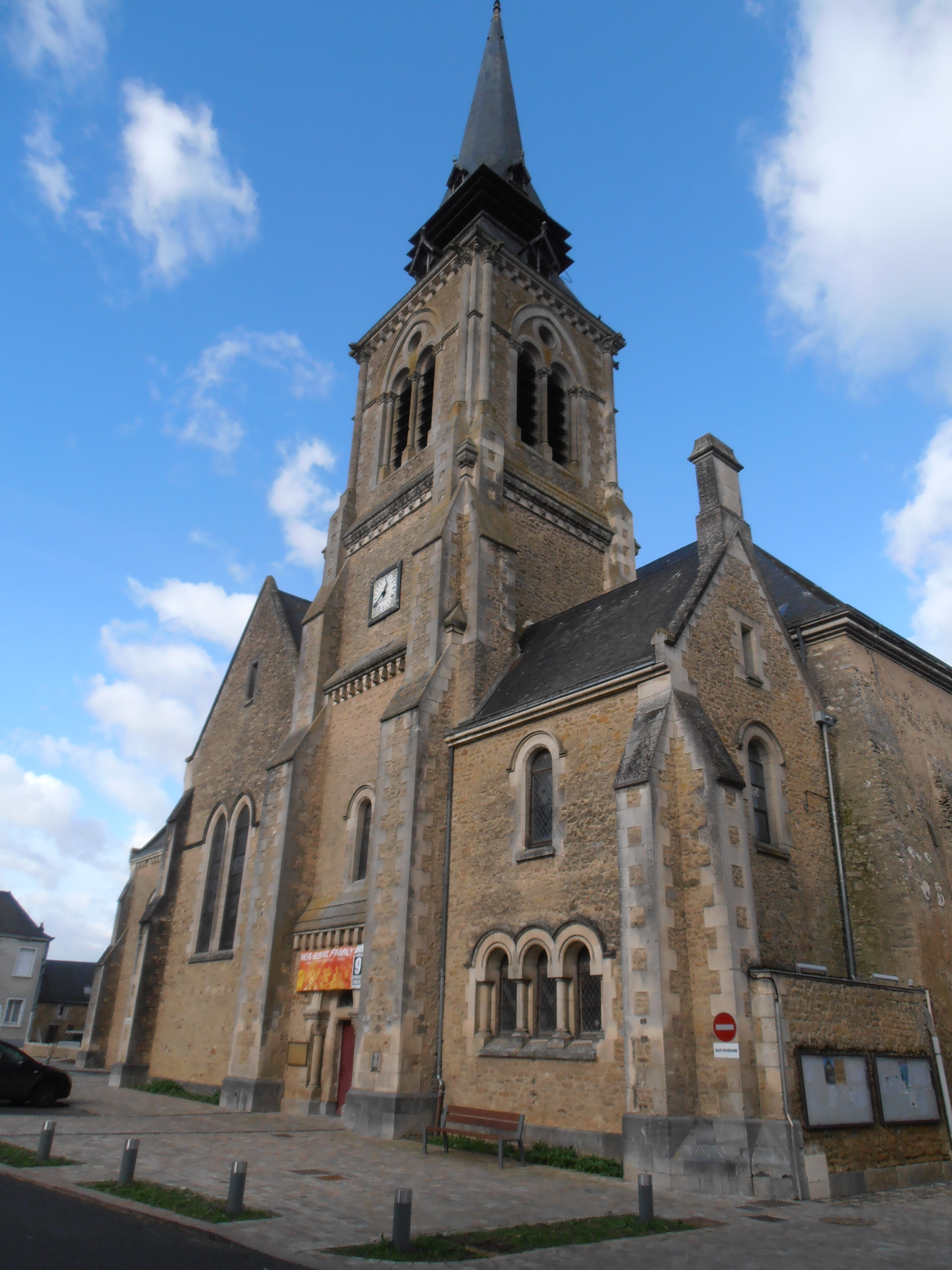
- The church of Saint-Pierre
- Location of Précigne
- Location within France Location within Pays de la Loire
- Coordinates: 47°45′58″N 0°19′24″W
- Country: France
- Region: Pays de la Loire
- Department: Sarthe
- Arrondissement: La Flèche
- Canton: Sablé-sur-Sarthe
- Intercommunality: CC Pays Sabolien

Government
  - Mayor (2020–2026): Jean-François Zalesny
- Area^{1}: 57.85 km^{2} (22.34 sq mi)
- Highest elevation: 60 m (200 ft)
- Lowest elevation: 20 m (66 ft)
- Population (2023): 2,877
  - Density: 49.73/km^{2} (128.8/sq mi)
- Demonym: Précignéens
- Time zone: UTC+01:00 (CET)
  - Summer (DST): UTC+02:00 (CEST)
- INSEE/Postal code: 72244 /72300
- ^{1} French Land Register data, which excludes lakes, ponds, glaciers > 1 km^{2} (0.386 sq mi or 247 acres) and river estuaries.

Précigné (French pronunciation: [pʁesiɲe]) is a commune in the Sarthe département in the region of Pays de la Loire in north-western France.

== Population ==
Historical population
Year	Pop.	±% p.a.
1968	2,145	—
1975	2,111	−0.23%
1982	2,110	−0.01%
1990	2,299	+1.08%
1999	2,645	+1.57%
2007	2,868	+1.02%
2012	3,070	+1.37%
2017	2,973	−0.64%
2023	2,877	−0.55%
Source: INSEE

== See also ==
- Communes of the Sarthe department
