= E. E. Cummings =

American poet and author (1894–1962)

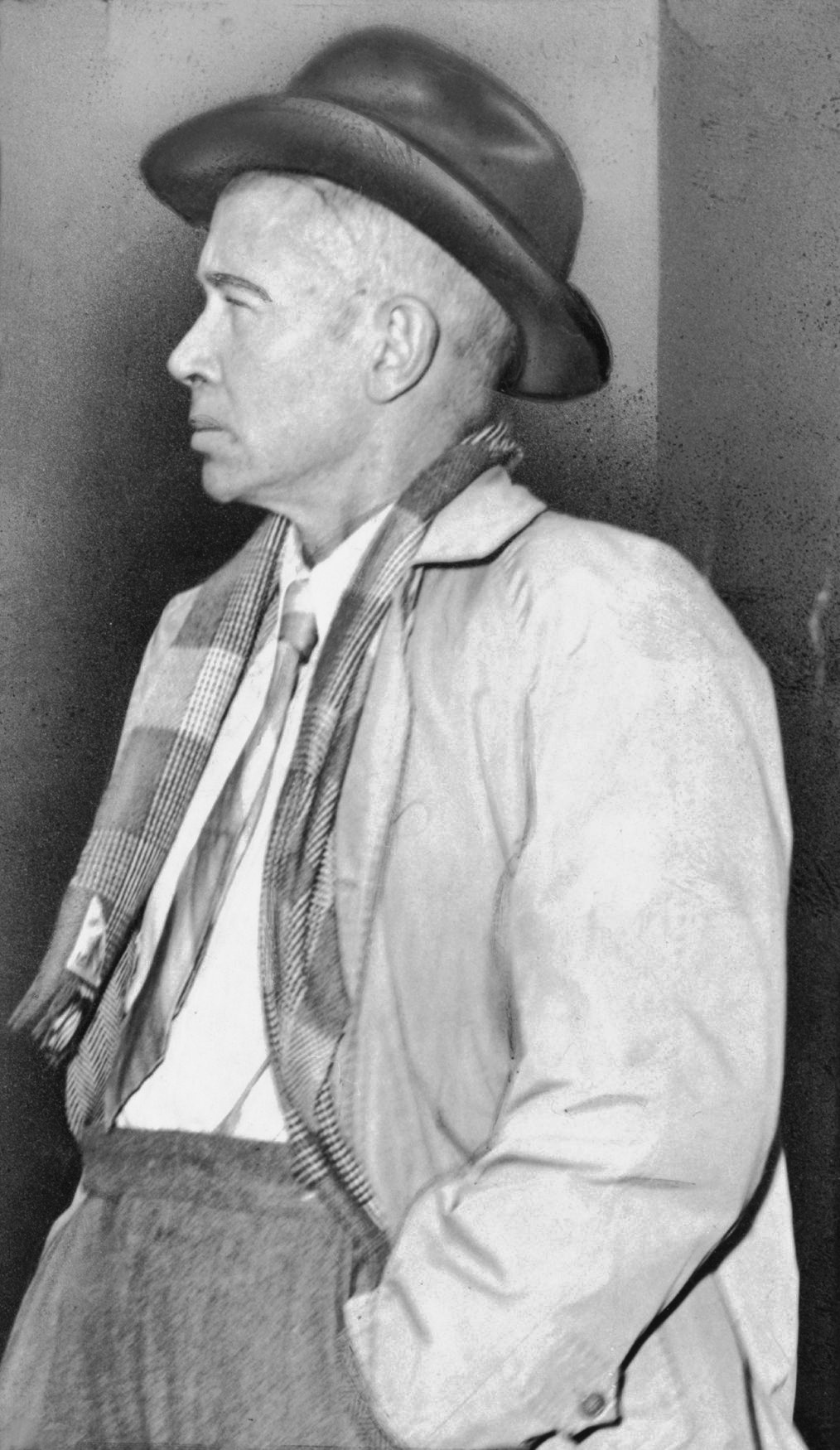
- Cummings in 1953
- Born: Edward Estlin Cummings; October 14, 1894; Cambridge, Massachusetts, U.S.
- Died: September 3, 1962 (aged 67); Madison, New Hampshire, U.S.
- Resting place: Forest Hills Cemetery
- Education: Harvard University (BA, MA)
- Occupation: Author
- Spouses: Elaine Orr Thayer (m. 1924, divorced) Anne Minnerly Barton (m. 1929; div. 1934)
- Partner: Marion Morehouse (1934–1962)
- Children: 1
- Writing career
- Years active: 1921–1962

Edward Estlin Cummings (October 14, 1894 – September 3, 1962), commonly known as e e cummings or E. E. Cummings, was an American poet, painter, essayist, author, and playwright. During World War I, he worked as an ambulance driver and was imprisoned in an internment camp, which provided the basis for his novel The Enormous Room (1922). The following year he published his first collection of poetry, Tulips and Chimneys, which showed his early experiments with grammar and typography. He wrote four plays, the most successful of which were HIM (1927) and Santa Claus: A Morality (1946). He wrote EIMI (1933), a travelog of the Soviet Union, and delivered the Charles Eliot Norton Lectures in poetry, published as i—six nonlectures (1953). Fairy Tales (1965), a collection of short stories, was published posthumously.

Cummings wrote approximately 2,900 poems. He is often regarded as one of the most important American poets of the 20th century. He is associated with modernist free-form poetry, and much of his work uses idiosyncratic syntax and lower-case spellings for poetic expression. M. L. Rosenthal wrote:

The chief effect of Cummings' jugglery with syntax, grammar, and diction was to blow open otherwise trite and bathetic motifs through a dynamic rediscovery of the energies sealed up in conventional usage ... He succeeded masterfully in splitting the atom of the cute commonplace.

For Norman Friedman, Cummings's inventions "are best understood as various ways of stripping the film of familiarity from language to strip the film of familiarity from the world. Transform the word, he seems to have felt, and you are on the way to transforming the world."

The poet Randall Jarrell said of Cummings, "No one else has ever made avant-garde, experimental poems so attractive to the general and the special reader." James Dickey wrote, "I think that Cummings is a daringly original poet, with more vitality and more sheer, uncompromising talent than any other living American writer." Dickey described himself as "ashamed and even a little guilty in picking out flaws" in Cummings's poetry, which he compared to noting "the aesthetic defects in a rose. It is better to say what must finally be said about Cummings: that he has helped to give life to the language."

== Early life and education ==
Cummings was born on October 14, 1894, in Cambridge, Massachusetts, to Edward Cummings and Rebecca Haswell (née Clarke), a well-known Unitarian upper-class couple in the city. His father was a professor at Harvard University who later became nationally known as the minister of South Congregational Church (Unitarian) in Boston, Massachusetts. His mother, who loved to spend time with her children, played games with Edward and his sister, Elizabeth. From an early age, Cummings's parents supported his creative gifts. Cummings wrote poems and drew as a child, and he often played outdoors with the other children who lived in his neighborhood. He grew up in the company of family friends such as the philosophers William James and Josiah Royce. Many of Cummings's summers were spent on Silver Lake in Madison, New Hampshire, where his father had built two houses along the eastern shore. The family ultimately purchased the nearby Joy Farm where Cummings had his primary summer residence.

He expressed transcendental leanings his entire life. As he matured, Cummings moved to an "I, Thou" relationship with God. His journals are replete with references to "le bon Dieu", as well as prayers for inspiration in his poetry and artwork (such as "Bon Dieu! may i some day do something truly great. amen."). Cummings "also prayed for strength to be his essential self ('may I be I is the only prayer—not may I be great or good or beautiful or wise or strong'), and for relief of spirit in times of depression ('almighty God! I thank thee for my soul; & may I never die spiritually into a mere mind through disease of loneliness')".

Cummings wanted to be a poet from childhood and wrote poetry daily from age 8 to 22, exploring assorted forms. He studied Latin and Greek at Cambridge Latin High School. He attended Harvard University, graduating with a Bachelor of Arts degree magna cum laude and was elected to the Phi Beta Kappa society in 1915. The following year, he received a Master of Arts degree from the university. During his studies at Harvard, he developed an interest in modern poetry, which ignored conventional grammar and syntax and aimed for a dynamic use of language. His first published poems appeared in Eight Harvard Poets (1917). Upon graduating, he worked for a book dealer.

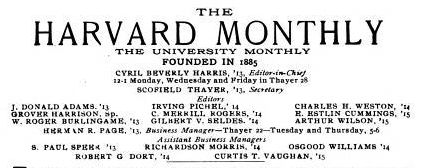
Masthead from volume 56 of The Harvard Monthly; Cummings was an editor and contributor to this literary journal while at Harvard

== Military service ==
In 1917, with the First World War going on in Europe, Cummings enlisted in the Norton-Harjes Ambulance Corps, a civilian volunteer organization. On the boat to France, he met William Slater Brown and they quickly became friends. Due to an administrative error, Cummings and Brown did not receive an assignment for five weeks, a period they spent exploring Paris. Cummings fell in love with the city, to which he would return throughout his life.

During their service in the ambulance corps, the two young writers sent letters home that drew the attention of the military censors. They were known to prefer the company of French soldiers over fellow ambulance drivers. The two openly expressed anti-war views, Cummings spoke of his lack of hatred for the Germans. On September 21, 1917, five months after starting his belated assignment, Cummings and William Slater Brown were arrested by the French military on suspicion of espionage and undesirable activities. They were held for three and a half months in a military detention camp at the Dépôt de Triage, in La Ferté-Macé, Orne, Normandy.

They were imprisoned with other detainees in a large room. Cummings's father made strenuous efforts to obtain his son's release through diplomatic channels; although advised his son's release was approved, there were lengthy delays, with little explanation. In frustration, Cummings's father wrote a letter to President Woodrow Wilson in December 1917. Cummings was released on December 19, 1917, returning to his family in the U.S. by New Year's Day, 1918. Cummings, his father, and Brown's family continued to agitate for Brown's release. By mid-February, he, too, was America-bound. Cummings used his prison experience as the basis for his novel, The Enormous Room (1922), about which F. Scott Fitzgerald said, "Of all the work by young men who have sprung up since 1920 one book survives—The Enormous Room by E. E. Cummings ... Those few who cause books to live have not been able to endure the thought of its mortality." Later in 1918 he was drafted into the army. He served a training deployment in the 12th Division at Camp Devens, Massachusetts, until November 1918.

Buffalo Bill's
defunct
who used to
ride a watersmooth-silver
stallion
and break onetwothreefourfive pigeonsjustlikethat
Jesus

he was a handsome man
and what i want to know is
how do you like your blueeyed boy
Mister Death

— "Buffalo Bill's" (1920) (Note: "Buffalo Bill's" available at the Poetry Foundation)

== Career ==
Cummings returned to Paris in 1921, and lived there for two years before returning to New York. His collection Tulips and Chimneys was published in 1923, and his inventive use of grammar and syntax is evident. The book was heavily cut by his editor. XLI Poems was published in 1925. With these collections, Cummings made his reputation as an avant-garde poet.

During the rest of the 1920s and 1930s, Cummings returned to Paris a number of times, and traveled throughout Europe. In 1931 Cummings traveled to the Soviet Union, recounting his experiences in Eimi, published two years later. During these years Cummings also traveled to Northern Africa and Mexico, and he worked as an essayist and portrait artist for Vanity Fair magazine (1924–1927).

In 1926, Cummings's parents were in a car crash; only his mother survived, although she was severely injured. Cummings later described the crash in the following passage from his i: six nonlectures series given at Harvard (as part of the Charles Eliot Norton Lectures) in 1952 and 1953:

A locomotive cut the car in half, killing my father instantly. When two brakemen jumped from the halted train, they saw a woman standing – dazed but erect – beside a mangled machine; with blood spouting (as the older said to me) out of her head. One of her hands (the younger added) kept feeling her dress, as if trying to discover why it was wet. These men took my sixty-six-year old mother by the arms and tried to lead her toward a nearby farmhouse; but she threw them off, strode straight to my father's body, and directed a group of scared spectators to cover him. When this had been done (and only then) she let them lead her away.

— E. E. Cummings (1952). "i & my parents: Nonlecture one", p. 12

His father's death had a profound effect on Cummings, who entered a new period in his artistic life. He began to focus on more important aspects of life in his poetry. He started this new period by paying homage to his father in the poem "my father moved through dooms of love". (Note: "my father moved through dooms of love", via —Berkeley)

In the 1930s, Samuel Aiwaz Jacobs was Cummings's publisher; he had started the Golden Eagle Press after working as a typographer and publisher.

== Personal life ==
=== Marriages ===
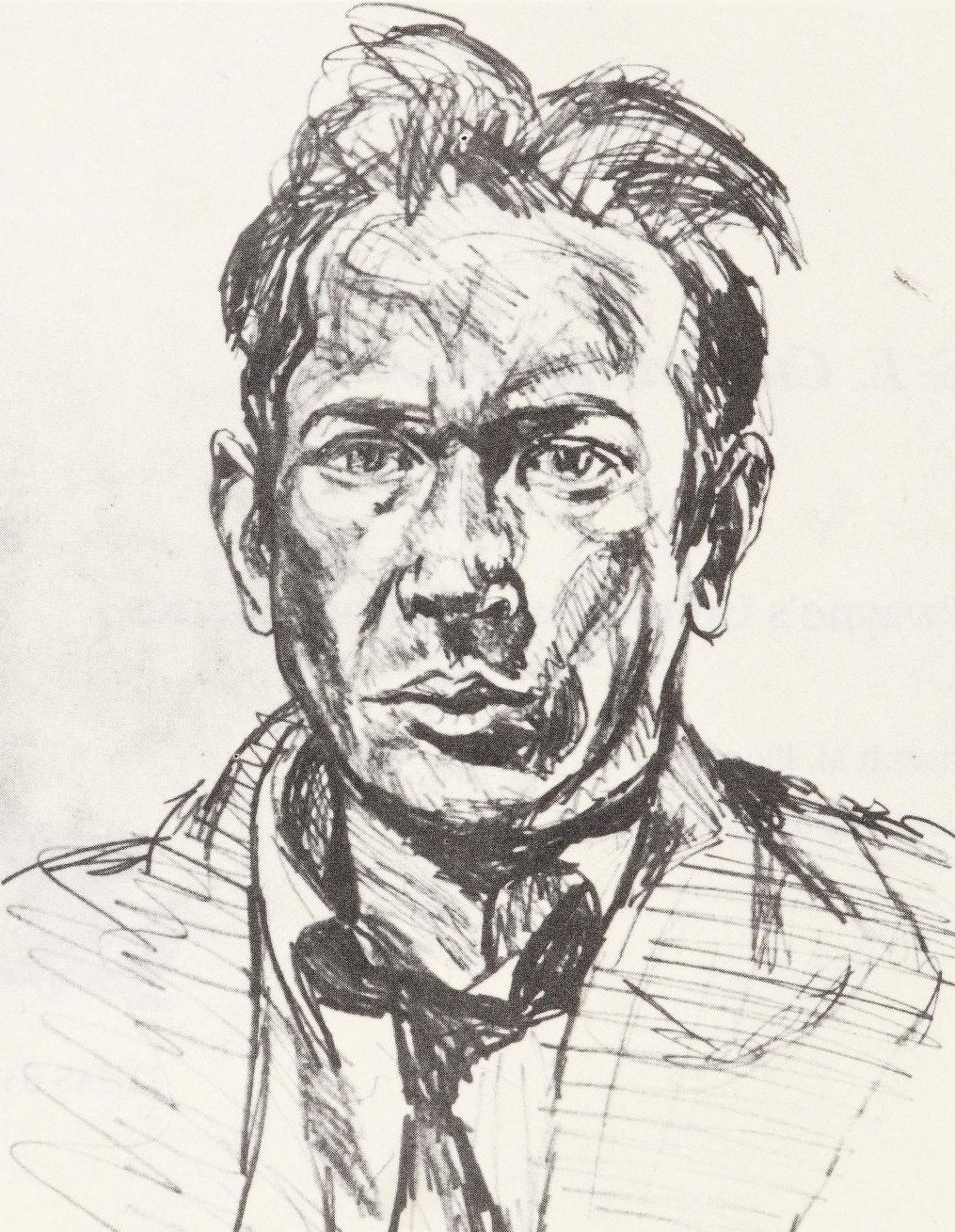
Sketched self-portrait c. 1920

Cummings's relationship with Elaine Orr began as a love affair in 1918, while she was still married to Scofield Thayer, one of Cummings' friends from Harvard. During this time, he wrote a large portion of his erotic poetry. The couple had a daughter while Orr was still married to Thayer. After Orr divorced Thayer, Cummings and Orr married on March 19, 1924. Thayer had been registered on the child's birth certificate as the father, but Cummings legally adopted her after his marriage to Orr. Although his relationship with Orr stretched back several years, the marriage was brief. On a trip to Paris, Orr met and fell in love with the Irish nobleman, future politician, author, journalist, and former banker Frank MacDermot. The couple separated after two months of marriage and divorced less than nine months later.

Cummings then married Anne Minnerly Barton on May 1, 1929. This was his second and final marriage. They separated three years later, in 1932. That same year, Minnerly obtained a Mexican divorce; it was not officially recognized in the United States until August 1934. Anne died in 1970 aged 72.

In 1934, Cummings met Marion Morehouse, a fashion model and photographer. It is not clear whether the two were ever formally married. Morehouse lived with Cummings at 4 Patchin Place, Greenwich Village, New York City, where Cummings had resided since September 1924. This was his longest relationship, lasting from 1934 until his death 28 years later.

In 1917, before his first marriage, Cummings shared several passionate love letters with a Parisian prostitute, Marie Louise Lallemand. Despite Cummings's efforts, he was unable to find Lallemand upon his return to Paris after serving at the front.

=== Political views ===
According to his testimony in EIMI, Cummings had little interest in politics until his trip to the Soviet Union in 1931. He subsequently shifted rightward on many political and social issues. Despite his radical and bohemian public image, he was a Republican and later an ardent supporter of Joseph McCarthy. Cummings was a longtime friend and correspondent of CIA counterintelligence chief James Angleton.

== Later life and death ==
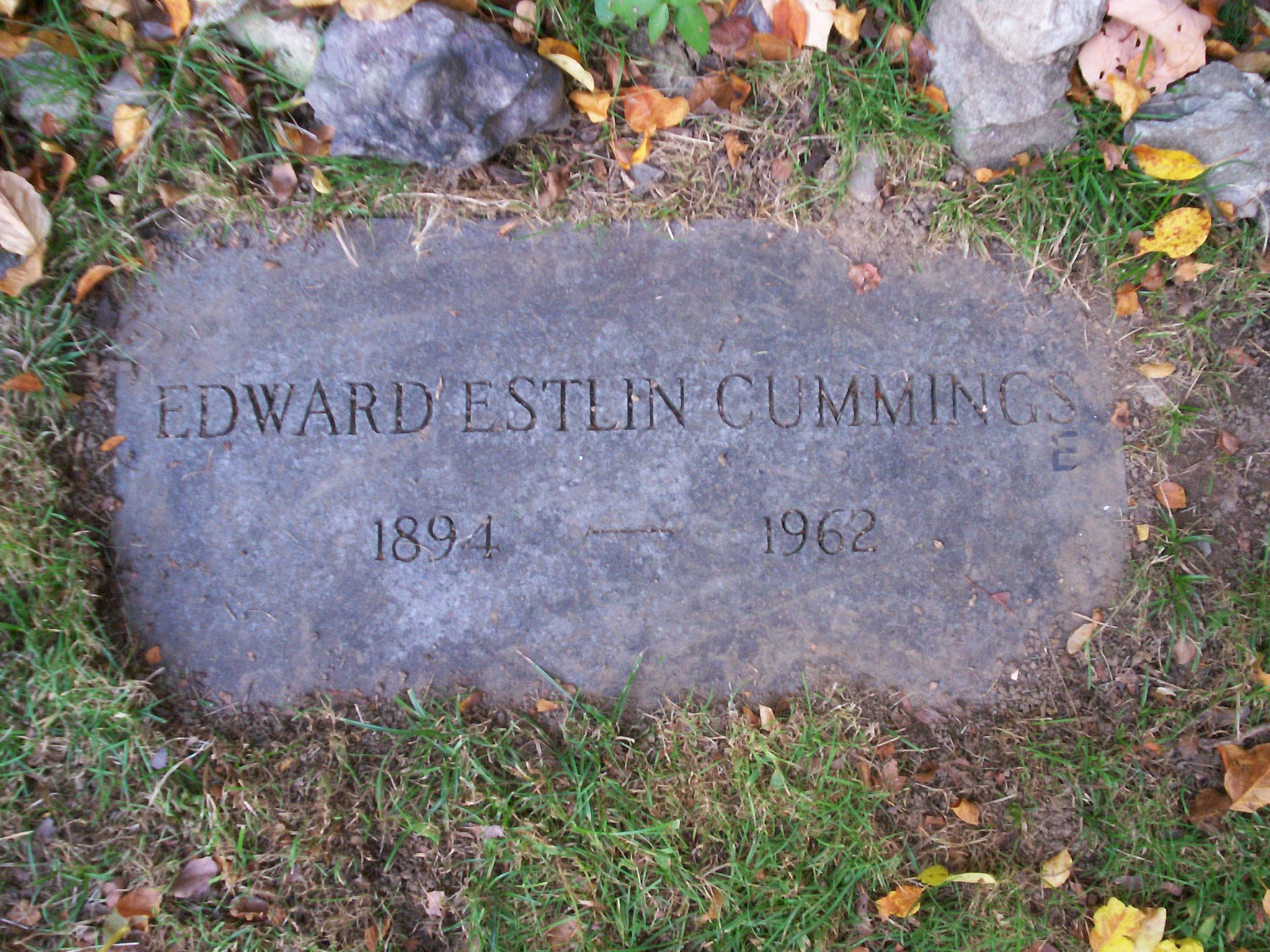
Grave of E. E. Cummings

In 1952, his alma mater, Harvard University, awarded Cummings an honorary seat as a guest professor. The Charles Eliot Norton Lectures he gave in 1952 and 1955 were later collected as i: six nonlectures.

i thank You God for most this amazing
day: for the leaping greenly spirits of trees
and a blue true dream of sky; and for everything
which is natural which is infinite which is yes

— From "i thank You God for most this amazing" (1950) (Note: See: Selected works (1994))

Cummings spent the last decade of his life traveling, fulfilling speaking engagements, and spending time at his summer home, Joy Farm, in Silver Lake, New Hampshire. He died of a stroke on September 3, 1962, at the age of 67 at Memorial Hospital in North Conway, New Hampshire. Cummings was buried at Forest Hills Cemetery in Boston, Massachusetts. At the time of his death, Cummings was recognized as the "second most widely read poet in the United States, after Robert Frost".

Cummings's papers are held at the Houghton Library at Harvard University and the Harry Ransom Center at the University of Texas at Austin.

== Literary overview ==
=== Poetry ===
As well as being influenced by notable modernists, including Gertrude Stein and Ezra Pound, Cummings was particularly drawn to early imagist experiments; later, his visits to Paris exposed him to Dada and Surrealism, which was reflected in his writing style. Cummings critic and biographer Norman Friedman remarks that in Cummings's later work the "shift from simile to symbol" created poetry that is "frequently more lucid, more moving, and more profound than his earlier".

Despite Cummings's familiarity with avant-garde styles (likely affected by the calligrams of French poet Apollinaire, according to a contemporary observation), much of his work draws inspiration from traditional forms. For example, many of his poems are sonnets, albeit described by Richard D. Cureton as "revisionary ... with scrambled rhymes and rearranged, disproportioned structures; awkwardly unpredictable metrical variation; clashing, mawkish diction; complex, wandering syntax; etc." He occasionally drew from the blues form and used acrostics. Many of Cummings's poems are satirical and address social issues (Note: For example, "why must itself up every of a park") but have an equal or even stronger bias toward Romanticism: time and again his poems celebrate love, sex, and the season of rebirth. (Note: For example, "[anyone lived in a pretty how town]")

While his poetic forms and themes share an affinity with the Romantic tradition, critic Emily Essert asserts that Cummings's work is particularly modernist and frequently employs what linguist Irene Fairley calls "syntactic deviance". Some poems do not involve any typographical or punctuation innovations at all, but purely syntactic ones; many of the poems he is best known for, however, do possess a stylistic typography he made his own, particularly in his insistent use of the lower case 'i'.

i carry your heart with me(i carry it in
my heart)i am never without it(anywhere
i go you go,my dear;and whatever is done
by only me is your doing,my darling)
i fear
no fate(for you are my fate,my sweet)i want
no world(for beautiful you are my world,my true)
and it's you are whatever a moon has always meant
and whatever a sun will always sing is you

here is the deepest secret nobody knows
(here is the root of the root and the bud of the bud
and the sky of the sky of a tree called life;which grows
higher than soul can hope or mind can hide)
and this is the wonder that's keeping the stars apart

i carry your heart(i carry it in my heart)

— From "i carry your heart with me(i carry it in" (1952) (Note: "i carry your heart with me(i carry it in" at the Poetry Foundation.)

While some of his poetry is free verse (and not beheld to rhyme or meter), Cureton has remarked that many of his sonnets follow an intricate rhyme scheme, and often employ pararhyme. A number of Cummings's poems feature his typographically exuberant style, with words, parts of words, or punctuation symbols scattered across the page, wherein Essert asserts "feeling is first" and the work begs to "be re-read in order to be understood"; Cummings, also a painter, created his texts not just as literature, but as "visual objects" on the page, and used typography to "paint a picture".

The seeds of Cummings's unconventional style appear well established even in his earliest work. At age six, he wrote to his father:

FATHER DEAR. BE, YOUR FATHER-GOOD AND GOOD,
HE IS GOOD NOW, IT IS NOT GOOD TO SEE IT RAIN,
FATHER DEAR IS, IT, DEAR, NO FATHER DEAR,
LOVE, YOU DEAR,
ESTLIN.

Following his autobiographical novel, The Enormous Room, Cummings's first published work was a collection of poems titled Tulips and Chimneys (1923). This early work already displayed Cummings's characteristically eccentric use of grammar and punctuation, although a fair number of the poems are written in conventional language.

anyone lived in a pretty how town
(with up so floating many bells down)
spring summer autumn winter
he sang his didn't he danced his did

Women and men (both little and small)
cared for anyone not at all
they sowed their isn't they reaped their same
sun moon stars rain

— From "anyone lived in a pretty how town" (1940) (Note: Text from the Poetry Foundation: [anyone lived in a pretty how town])

Cummings's works often do not follow the conventional rules that generate typical English sentences, or what Fairley identifies as "ungrammar". In addition, a number of Cummings's poems feature, in part or in whole, intentional misspellings, and several incorporate phonetic spellings intended to represent particular dialects. Cummings also employs what Fairley describes as "morphological innovation", wherein he frequently creates what critic Ian Landles calls: "unusual compounds suggestive of 'a child's language'" like "'mud-luscious' and 'puddle-wonderful'". Literary critic R. P. Blackmur has commented that this use of language is "frequently unintelligible because [Cummings] disregards the historical accumulation of meaning in words in favor of merely private and personal associations".

Fellow poet Edna St. Vincent Millay, in her equivocal letter recommending Cummings for the Guggenheim Fellowship he was awarded in 1934, expressed her frustration at his opaque symbolism. "[I]f he prints and offers for sale poetry which he is quite content should be, after hours of sweating concentration, inexplicable from any point of view to a person as intelligent as myself, then he does so with a motive which is frivolous from the point of view of art, and should not be helped or encouraged by any serious person or group of persons ... there is fine writing and powerful writing (as well as some of the most pompous nonsense I ever let slip to the floor with a wide yawn) ... What I propose, then, is this: that you give Mr. Cummings enough rope. He may hang himself; or he may lasso a unicorn."

Cummings also wrote children's books and novels. A notable example of his versatility is an introduction he wrote for a collection of the comic strip Krazy Kat.

Cummings included ethnic slurs in his writing, which proved controversial. In his 1950 collection Xaipe: Seventy-One Poems, Cummings published two poems containing words that caused outrage in some quarters. Friedman considered these two poems to be "condensed" and "cryptic" parables, "sparsely told", in which setting the use of such "inflammatory material" was likely to meet with reader misapprehension. Poet William Carlos Williams spoke out in his defense.

one day a nigger
caught in his hand
a little star no bigger
than not to understand

"i'll never let you go
until you've made me white"
so she did and now
stars shine at night.

— no. 24, from Xaipe (1950)
Translation:

a kike is the most dangerous
machine as yet invented
by even yankee ingenu
ity(out of a jew a few
dead dollars and some twisted laws)
it comes both prigged and canted

— no. 46, from Xaipe (1950)

Cummings biographer Catherine Reef notes of the controversy:

Friends begged Cummings to reconsider publishing these poems, and the book's editor pleaded with him to withdraw them, but he insisted that they stay. All the fuss perplexed him. The poems were commenting on prejudice, he pointed out, and not condoning it. He intended to show how derogatory words cause people to see others in terms of stereotypes rather than as individuals. "America (which turns Hungarian into 'hunky' & Irishman into 'mick' and Norwegian into 'square-head') is to blame for 'kike,'" he said.

=== Plays ===
During his lifetime, Cummings published four plays. HIM, a three-act play, was first produced in 1928 by the Provincetown Players in New York City. The production was directed by James Light. The play's main characters are "Him", a playwright, portrayed by William Johnstone, and "Me", his girlfriend, portrayed by Erin O'Brien-Moore.

Cummings said of the unorthodox play:

Relax and give the play a chance to strut its stuff—relax, stop wondering what it is all 'about'—like many strange and familiar things, Life included, this play isn't 'about,' it simply is. ... Don't try to enjoy it, let it try to enjoy you. DON'T TRY TO UNDERSTAND IT, LET IT TRY TO UNDERSTAND YOU."

Anthropos, or the Future of Art is a short, one-act play that Cummings contributed to the anthology Whither, Whither or After Sex, What? A Symposium to End Symposium. The play consists of dialogue between Man, the main character, and three "infrahumans", or inferior beings. The word anthropos is the Greek word for "man", in the sense of "mankind".

Tom, A Ballet is a ballet based on Uncle Tom's Cabin. The ballet is detailed in a "synopsis" as well as descriptions of four "episodes", which were published by Cummings in 1935. It remained unperformed until 2015.

Santa Claus: A Morality was probably Cummings's most successful play. It is an allegorical Christmas fantasy presented in one act of five scenes. The play was inspired by his daughter Nancy, with whom he was reunited in 1946. It was first published in the Harvard College magazine, Wake. The play's main characters are Santa Claus, his family (Woman and Child), Death, and Mob. At the outset of the play, Santa Claus's family has disintegrated due to their lust for knowledge (Science). After a series of events, however, Santa Claus's faith in love and his rejection of the materialism and disappointment he associates with Science are reaffirmed, and he is reunited with Woman and Child.

=== Art ===
Cummings was an avid painter, referring to writing and painting as his "twin obsessions" and to himself as a "poetandpainter." He painted "continuously, relentlessly, from childhood until his death, and left in his estate more than 1600 oils and watercolors (a figure that does not include the works he sold during his career) and over 9,000 drawings." In a self-interview from Foreword to an Exhibit: II (1945), the artist asked himself, "Tell me, doesn't your painting interfere with your writing?" and answered, "Quite the contrary: they love each other dearly."

Cummings had more than 30 exhibits of his paintings in his lifetime. He received substantial acclaim as an American cubist and an abstract, avant garde painter between the World Wars, but with the publication of his books The Enormous Room and Tulips and Chimneys in the 1920s, his reputation as a poet eclipsed his success as a visual artist. In 1931, he published a limited edition volume of his artwork entitled CIOPW, named for his media of charcoal, ink, oil, pencil, and watercolor. About this same time, he began to break from Modernist aesthetics and employ a more subjective and spontaneous style; his work became more representational: landscapes, nudes, still lifes, and portraits.

=== Name and capitalization ===
Cummings's publishers and others have often echoed the unconventional orthography in his poetry by writing his name in lower case. Cummings himself used both the lowercase and capitalized versions, though he most often signed his name with capitals.

The use of lower case for his initials was popularized in part by the title of some books, particularly in the 1960s, printing his name in lower case on the cover and spine. In the preface to E. E. Cummings: The Growth of a Writer by Norman Friedman, critic Harry T. Moore notes Cummings "had his name put legally into lower case, and in his later books the titles and his name were always in lower case". According to Cummings's widow, however, this is incorrect. She wrote to Friedman: "You should not have allowed H. Moore to make such a stupid & childish statement about Cummings & his signature." On February 27, 1951, Cummings wrote to his French translator D. Jon Grossman that he preferred the use of upper case for the particular edition they were working on. One Cummings scholar believes that on the rare occasions that Cummings signed his name in all lower case, he may have intended it as a gesture of humility, not as an indication that it was the preferred orthography for others to use. Additionally, The Chicago Manual of Style, which prescribes favoring non-standard capitalization of names in accordance with the bearer's strongly stated preference, notes "E. E. Cummings can be safely capitalized; it was one of his publishers, not he himself, who lowercased his name."

== Adaptations ==
In 1943, modern dancer and choreographer, Jean Erdman presented "The Transformations of Medusa, Forever and Sunsmell" with a commissioned score by John Cage and a spoken text from the title poem by E. E. Cummings, sponsored by the Arts Club of Chicago. Erdman also choreographed "Twenty Poems" (1960), a cycle of E. E. Cummings's poems for eight dancers and one actor, with a commissioned score by Teiji Ito. It was performed in the round at the Circle in the Square Theatre in Greenwich Village.

Numerous composers have set Cummings's poems to music:

- In 1970, Pierre Boulez composed Cummings ist der Dichter ('cummings is the Poet') from poems by E. E. Cummings.
- Aribert Reimann set Cummings to music in "Impression IV" (1961) for soprano and piano.
- Italian composer Luciano Berio's 1960 composition Circles is a setting of three poems by E. E. Cummings, including the poems "Stinging", "Riverly Is a Flower", and "N(o)w".
- Morton Feldman (1926–1987) in 1951 composed "4 Songs to e.e. cummings" for soprano, piano and cello, using material from Cummings's 50 Poems of 1940: "!Blac", "Air", "(Sitting In A Tree-)" and "(Moan)".
- Twelve Songs (12 dal) by Zoltán Jeney (1943–2019), for soprano, violin and piano, completed between 1975 and 1983, is based mostly on poems by Cummings. Other texts include those by Sándor Weöres, Dezső Tandori, William Blake and Hölderlin.
- The Icelandic singer Björk used lines from Cummings's poem "I Will Wade Out" for the lyrics of "Sun in My Mouth" on her 2001 album Vespertine. On her next album, Medúlla (2004), Björk used his poem "It May Not Always Be So" as the lyrics for the song "Sonnets/Unrealities XI".
- The American composer Eric Whitacre wrote a cycle of works for choir titled The City and the Sea, which consists of five poems by Cummings set to music. He also wrote music for "little tree" and "i carry your heart", among others.
- Others who have composed settings for his poems include, among many others:
  - Dominic Argento
  - William Bergsma
  - Leonard Bernstein
  - Marc Blitzstein
  - John Cage
  - Romeo Cascarino
  - Aaron Copland
  - Serge de Gastyne
  - David Diamond
  - John Duke
  - Margaret Garwood
  - Daron Hagen
  - Michael Hedges
  - Timothy Hoekman
  - Richard Hundley
  - Barbara Kolb
  - Leonard Lehrman
  - Robert Manno
  - Salvatore Martirano
  - William Mayer
  - John Musto
  - Paul Nordoff
  - Tobias Picker
  - Vincent Persichetti
  - Ned Rorem
  - Peter Schickele
  - Elie Siegmeister
  - Ann Loomis Silsbee
  - Aki Takase
  - Hugo Weisgall
  - Dan Welcher
  - James Yannatos
  - Matthew Peterson
  - David Conte

== Awards ==
During his lifetime, Cummings received numerous awards in recognition of his work, including:

- Dial Award (1925)
- Guggenheim Fellowship (1933)
- Shelley Memorial Award for Poetry (1945)
- Harriet Monroe Prize from Poetry magazine (1950)
- Fellowship of American Academy of Poets (1950)
- Guggenheim Fellowship (1951)
- Charles Eliot Norton Professorship at Harvard (1952–1953)
- Special citation from the National Book Award Committee for his Poems, 1923–1954 (1957)
- Bollingen Prize in Poetry (1958)
- Boston Arts Festival Award (1957)
- Two-year Ford Foundation grant of $15,000 (1959)

== Books ==
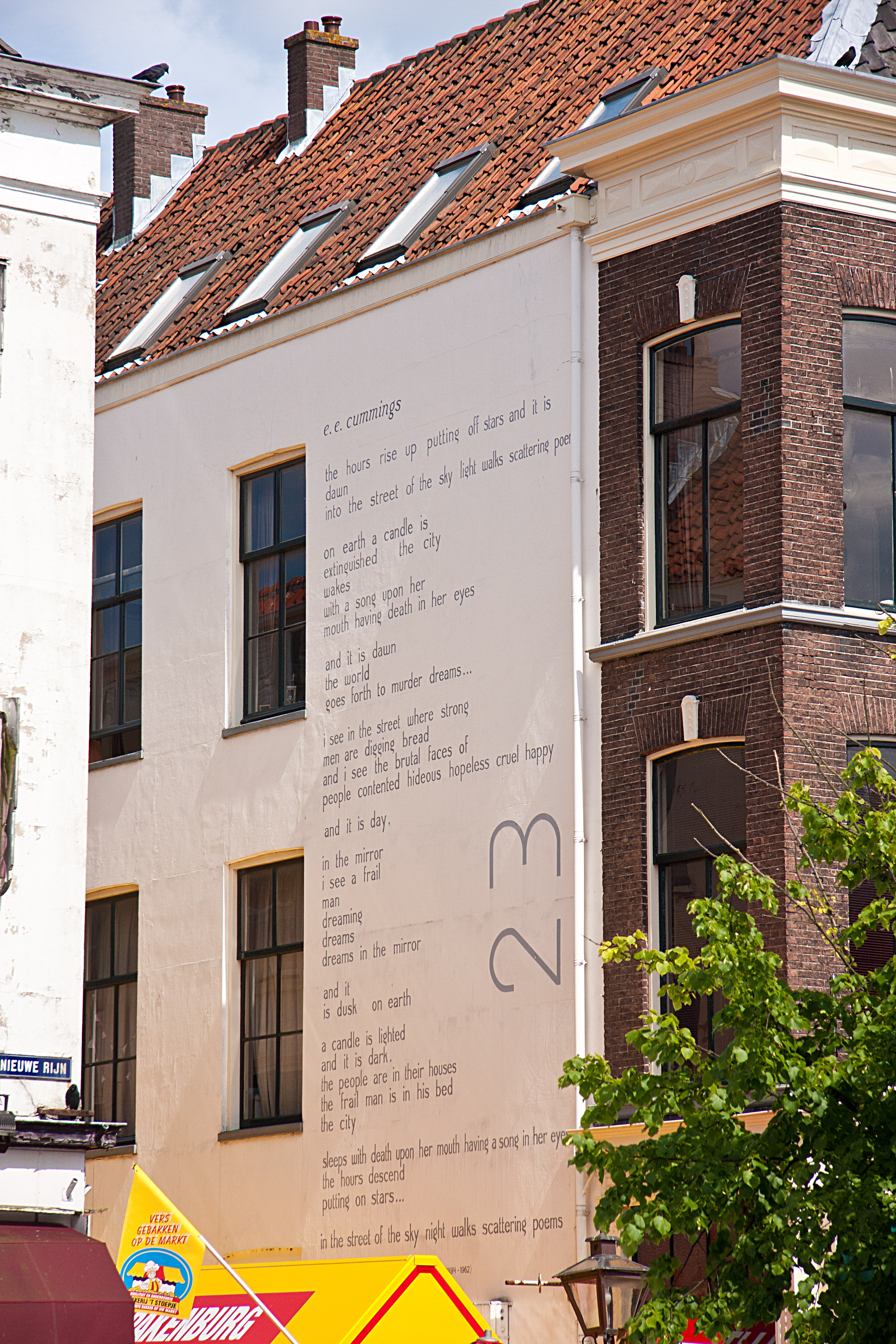
"the hours rise up" on a wall in Leiden

=== Prose books ===
- The Enormous Room (1922)
- EIMI (1933), Soviet travelogue
- Fairy Tales (1965), collection of short stories

=== Poetry ===
- Tulips and Chimneys (1923)
- & (1925), self-published
- XLI Poems (1925)
- is 5 (1926)
- ViVa (1931)
- No Thanks (1935)
- Collected Poems (1938)
- 50 Poems (1940)
- 1 × 1 (1944)
- XAIPE: Seventy-One Poems (1950)
- Poems, 1923–1954 (1954)
- 95 Poems (1958)
- Selected Poems 1923-1958 (1960)
- 73 Poems (1963, posthumous)
- Etcetera: The Unpublished Poems (1983)
- Complete Poems, 1904–1962, edited by George James Firmage (2008), Liveright
- Erotic Poems, edited by George James Firmage (2010), Norton

=== Plays ===
- Him (1927)
- Anthropos: or the Future of Art (1930)
- Tom (1935)
- Santa Claus: A Morality (1946)
- Three Plays and a Ballet (October House, 1967), containing all four dramatic works
- The Theater of E. E. Cummings (W. W. Norton & Company, 2013), a reissue of Three Plays and a Ballet, with supplementary material

=== Collections ===
- CIOPW (1931), art works
- i—six nonlectures (1953), Harvard University Press
