= Dragonetti =

Dragonetti is a surname. Notable people with the surname include:

- Domenico Carlo Maria Dragonetti (1763–1846), an Italian double bass virtuoso
- Giacinto Dragonetti (1738–1818) Italian jurist and writer
- John Dragonetti, half of The Submarines, an American indie rock band
- Jessica Dragonette (1900–1980), American singer; born Jessica Valentina Dragonetti
- Leila Dragonette (1927–1979), American mathematician
- Ree Dragonette (1918–1979), American poet; born Rita Marie Dragonetti

== See also ==
- The Dragonetti Act, which regulates the torts of abuse of process and malicious prosecution in Pennsylvania
- Dragonetti, a part of Filiano
