= Valentina Acava =

Valentina Acava is a writer, educator and artivist. She is an outspoken advocate to end female genital mutilation (FGM) using artistic and educational Workshops. She was born into Italian and Greek parents and was raised in South Africa. She is the founder of Creative Encounters, an artistic platform for artists in East Africa.

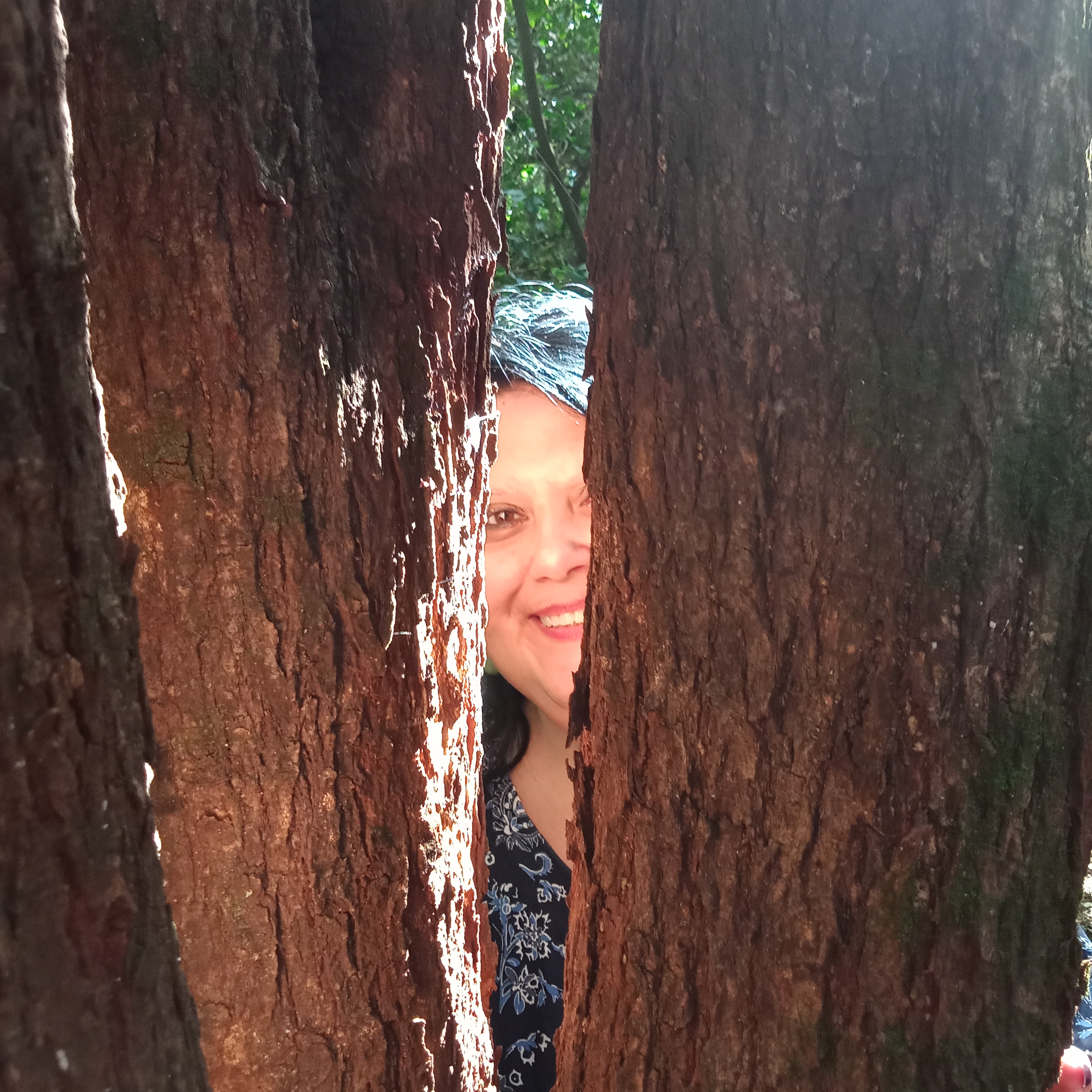

She started her career as a journalist corresponding from different African countries. She has published 11 books, including children's books, novels, and poetry. Io... donna... immigrata... (I...immigrant...woman...) is a play that has been staged in Italy, France, Congo, Kenya, South Africa. The Cut is the final work produced out of the Gugu Women Lab, a collective of women from South Africa and other African countries founded in Cape Town in 2011. It is based on the true experience of some of the participants who have undergone female genital mutilation. The performance has been on stage in 2013 in Italy and in the early days of 2014 received the sponsorship of Amnesty International Italia for its value in promoting awareness on female genital mutilation using art.

A selection of her stories was published in 2013 on the 2nd issue of Italian Studies of Southern Africa Journal (UNISA - Pretoria 2013).

She has represented South Africa, along with other writers from the Africa Continent, at the International Grinzane Cavour Meeting "Il deserto e dopo. La letteratura africana dall’oralità alla parola scritta” in 2007.

Her novel Cercando Lindiwe was chosen by Prof. Antonella Piazza of the Department of Italian Studies of UNISA-Pretoria for her comparatistic work: "The issue of Identity in Cercando Lindiwe by Valentina Acava Mmaka and If This Is a Man by Primo Levi" which was presented for the first time in occasion of the 1st Colloquium of Italian Studies at UNISA/Pretoria in September 2011.

She is the founder of the Social Change Program Invisible Cities which aims to upgrade marginalized neighborhoods using art to make impact and create social change.

She has nearly 20 years of experience working with immigrants, refugees and asylum seekers in different countries.

She speaks at international meetings, universities, and conferences.

Her monologue "Farida" has been published in the collection Time to say NO, edited by Philo Ikonya and Helmuth Niederle by Austrian PEN Club.

== Publications ==
=== Children's books ===
- Il mondo a colori della famiglia BwanaVal (Kabiliana 2002)
- Jabuni il mistero della città sommersa (EMI 2003)
- I nomi della Pace Amani (EMI 2004)
- Le Fantastiche Storie di Ortensia (KabilianaPress 2016)
- La Storia di Selma (KabilianaPress 2016)

=== Novels ===
- Cercando Lindiwe (Epoché 2007- KabilianaPress 2014)
- Il Viaggio Capovolto (Epoché 2010)

=== Theatre ===
- Io...donna...immigrata... volere dire scrivere (EMI 2004)
- I ... immigrant... woman... (2017)
- The Cut (2016)

=== Poetry ===
- L'Ottava Nota (Prospettiva 2002)
- OUT (KabilianaPress 2016)

=== Essay ===
- "The Cut. Voices for Change breaking Silence on Female Genital Mutilation" (2017)

=== Projects ===
In 2011, Mmaka founded in Cape Town a collective of women (South African and immigrant from other African countries) to produce a writing project on human rights. The results were the basis for her play, The Cut.
