= Ree Dragonette =

American poet

- Dragonette in concert with Eric Dolphy, 1962
- Born: Rita Marie Dragonetti; November 13, 1918; Philadelphia, Pennsylvania, U.S.
- Died: January 18, 1979 (aged 60); New York City, U.S.
- Spouse(s): Charles Dye; John Corsiglia
- Children: 4

Ree Dragonette (November 13, 1918 – January 18, 1979) was an American poet active on the New York poetry scene in the 1960s and 1970s. She founded the Calliope Poetry Theatre in 1971 and ran it until 1978. Her poetry-and-jazz concert with Eric Dolphy in 1962 was one of the first of its kind.

== Biography ==
She was born in Philadelphia on November 13, 1918, the youngest of twelve children of Italian immigrant parents. Her father was a tailor. Jessica Dragonette (1900–1980), the semiclassical singer and radio star, was her cousin. She had a son, Reed, with her first husband, Charles Dye; with her second husband, John Corsiglia, she had three children, Juanita, John, and Ralph.

In the late 1940s she moved to New York City, where she later gave and organized poetry readings at the Harlequin, Les Deux Mégots, Le Metro and other venues. A childhood friend of the writer, Theodore Sturgeon, in Philadelphia, she lived with him in New York in 1946. She was known as a powerful reader; writer D. H. Melhem recalled that she had a magnificent voice. Often described as a metaphysical poet, in the 1960s Dragonette was also known as a jazz poet. Her 1962 concert with the Eric Dolphy Quintet at New York's Town Hall, arranged by Martin Mitchell and Ross Fagin, was "unprecedented," according to Calvin C. Hernton. Writing in Down Beat magazine, critic Bill Coss called it "the first big-league combination of the two art forms that has had moments of true brilliance." Dolphy spent several months composing original music in response to four of Dragonette's poems; one of these compositions, "Mandrake," is included on his album Iron Man (1963). Poet Lorenzo Thomas recalled decades later that although "the Dolphy/Dragonette collaboration was special in terms of its artistic achievement," it was also "typical of the kind of interdisciplinary and interracial artistic exchange available on the Lower East Side in the early 1960s."

After her second marriage ended, Dragonette worked at various jobs to support her children, often going for long periods without writing. In the early 1970s she moved to a subsidized apartment in the Westbeth Artists Community in Greenwich Village, where she held readings, ran the Calliope Poetry Theater, edited a poetry magazine called Voice Media, and taught a poetry workshop at the Greenwich House Music School. During the last few years of her life, she mentored and encouraged many younger writers, including Vera Lachmann, Ed Sanders, Daniela Gioseffi, Hugh Seidman, Stanley Barkan, Honor Moore, Glen Kappy, and D. H. Melhem. She died of cancer on January 18, 1979.

Her poetry has been published in many journals and anthologies, including Emily Dickinson: Letters from the World, ed. Marguerite Harris (Corinth Books, 1970) and The Dream Book: An Anthology of Writings by Italian American Women, ed. Helen Barolini (Schocken Books, 1985). A recording of her poem, "From the Valley of the Shadows," is included on New Jazz Poets (Folkways Records, 1967). Some of her correspondence and creative work is included with the Florynce Kennedy papers in the Schlesinger Library, Radcliffe Institute, Harvard University.

== Works ==
- Like Pharaoh's Eye, Like Onyx Stone, and Other Poems (1962)
- Four Poems (1963)
- With Brunt of Angels (1964)
- Parable of the Fixed Stars (1968)
- Say It in Sanskrit (1971)
- Apogee (with Denis Sivack, 1972)
- Remember Zion (1970)
- This Is The Way We Wash Our Hands (1977)
