= Howard Barlow (musician) =

American musical conductor (1892–1972)

Howard Barlow (May 1, 1892 – February 1, 1972) was an American musician whose work as a conductor included leading the orchestra on The Voice of Firestone on radio and television. Time magazine described him as "a quiet, businesslike musician with a vast repertoire at his command and a deft way of getting instantaneous results from his musicians." An article in The New York Times observing his 15th anniversary with CBS radio said that he had "a stimulating career that has affected not only music on the air and the public attitude toward it but the art of program-making in the concert halls as well".

== Early years ==
=== Family and education ===
Born on May 1, 1892, in Plain City, Ohio, Barlow was a boy soprano. When he was young, he and his family lived in Mount Carmel, Illinois, where his father, Earl W. Barlow, operated Barlow Furniture Factory. He attended Wabash County, Illinois, schools, including Lincoln High School. He had a brother and a sister. In 1909 the family moved to Denver after the factory burned a second time. A contributing factor to the move was Barlow's acute bronchitis that developed after he fell through broken ice when he was skating on the Wabash River. He spent a year working as a cowboy in Buffalo Creek, Colorado, in an effort to regain his health. He graduated from North High School in Denver in 1911. He attended the University of Colorado (UC) in 1911–1912. During Barlow's time in Denver he developed a friendship with bandleader Paul Whiteman, his parents and his sister and sang in a glee club directed by the elder Whiteman. They encouraged him to continue his pursuit of music. The Barlows moved to Portland, Oregon, and he graduated from Reed College there in 1915. He went to New York City in 1915 after receiving a scholarship to study music at Columbia University. After two years of postgraduate study there, he enlisted in the United States Army in 1917. Initially he was made Army song leader at Camp Greene in North Carolina. He went to France to serve in World War I, was on General Pershing's staff, "and his ability as music director was in constant demand". In May 1918 Barlow was announced as the American military forces' first official song director.

=== Music ===
Barlow's involvement with music began in Mount Carmel, as he taught himself to play the trumpet and played in the town's band. He had a few piano lessons but mainly learned that instrument on his own. He also played a cello. He organized and conducted the Methodist Sunday School orchestra in Mount Carmel. In 1965 he reflected on that enterprise: "It was a pretty sorry affair as we had no regular music and faked it all from the Sunday School song books." His first professional conducting of an orchestra came at a church in Denver while he was enrolled at UC. Barlow's attempts to direct the high school glee club that the elder Whiteman led brought about a shift in the young musician's focus. Whiteman offered to teach Barlow to how to conduct, and he accepted. Barlow later commented, "From that time on, I forgot my ambitions to be a pianist, singer, or cellist." During his time at Reed College he directed the school's chorus. When The Oregon Sunday Journal reviewed a 1913 Christmas program presented by that group, it said, "The work of the chorus was very effective. The singers showed excellent training, being at all times under the control of Conductor Howard Barlow."

== Career ==
By January 1916 Barlow had become the director of the Modern Musical Society in New York City, in addition to which he directed the women's chorus of that city's West Side YWCA and the Riverdale Choral Society. In the summer of 1916 he conducted music for a music festival in Bay View, Michigan. One of his early professional activities after the war was conducting music for a 1919 festival for the widow of composer Edward MacDowell. That year he also conducted for the biennial convention of the National Federation of Music Clubs' music festival, including his own composition, "The Song of Idas". In the fall of 1919 he joined the faculty of the Brooklyn Music School Settlement, teaching new classes in composition and harmony. In 1921 he taught as a member of the summer faculty at Ellison-White Conservatory of Music in Portland. In 1923 he organized a musical group that hired only native-born or naturalized Americans. Called the American National Orchestra, it lasted one year. In 1926, he was associate conductor of the New York State Symphony and musical director at the Neighborhood Playhouse in New York.

=== CBS ===
Barlow's tenure as leading symphonic conductor at CBS began when he led the orchestra for the network's inaugural broadcast on September 18, 1927. He pioneered the broadcasting of full-time symphonic concerts on that network and had the first sponsored series of symphonic broadcasts. The Kansas City Post reported on October 15, 1927, that Barlow "has received a veritable ovation for his fine work" and added that CBS's schedule for that night included the debut of the network's Concert Grand Orchestra under his direction. In 1928, Barlow commented on the unique nature of his Sunday broadcasts: "We present a new program every Sunday afternoon, and we have never repeated a single work." He compared each broadcast to a Carnegie Hall program, saying that with "neither applause nor waits" the orchestra tried to present as much music in a one-hour broadcast as might be heard in a concert at Carnegie Hall.

He was musical director for CBS radio for 17 years, a span in which his conducting was limited to "only serious music on radio and in concert halls". A tally of Barlow's work on radio from January 5. 1932, to January 1, 1933, showed, "in his symphony broadcasts he conducted 236 different selections over the Columbia network. Of these, 43 were full symphonies, 26 piano concerti. 20 violin concerti. 13 orchestral suites, 34 overtures and 67 tone poems, rhapsodies and miscellaneous forms." Programs for which he conducted orchestras included America's Hour, Columbia Workshop, Saturday Night Serenade, The March of Time, and Everybody’s Music.

=== Making changes ===
Barlow implemented changes in the kinds of music played on radio. After producers insisted that people would not listen to entire symphonies on the air, he played Haydn's "Military" symphony on a program. The response was so good that "he was allotted a nightly spot on which he performed one movement from a symphony in each broadcast until a long line of great symphonic works was completed". In response to a radio executive's complaint that he could not understand such music, Barlow began a series called Understanding Music, which The New York Times described as "highly popular and educational".

When Barlow began his career, works by American composers were seldom heard in concert halls, as managers said that they did not attract concert-goers. Barlow provided more exposure for them by playing them on radio broadcasts — probably to a greater extent than any other conductor. CBS supported his efforts by commissioning 12 American composers to write music for radio for two seasons with Barlow supervising their work.

=== NBC ===
In 1943 Barlow began conducting for NBC's weekly 30-minute programs, replacing Alfred Wallenstein. That responsibility included conducting for The Voice of Firestone. When the program later went to ABC, it was simulcast on radio and TV. His work on that program expanded his focus to include popular music along with classical and semi-classical compositions. In addition to conducting the orchestra, he selected all pieces used on the air and arranged them.

=== Municipal orchestras ===
In 1933, Barlow was guest conductor of the Philadelphia Orchestra for August 18–20 concerts in Robin Hood Dell He was guest conductor of the National Symphony Orchestra for a concert in 1936. He was named guest conductor of the Baltimore Symphony Orchestra for its 1940 season of 11 concerts. In May 1939 he had been that group's guest conductor for the opening of the National Federation of Music Clubs' music festival, after which a newspaper report said, "The members of the orchestra and many veteran musicians who attended the concert were loud in their praise of Mr. Barlow." In 1942 he was signed to direct the New York Philharmonic-Symphony Orchestra in eight concerts.

=== Philosophy regarding music ===
Barlow believed that the content of a composition was less important than how it was presented. Regarding The Voice of Firestone's mix of music, he said "I ... knew that actually it didn't matter so much what one plays as how one plays it. I can take almost any popular piece and give it an arrangement of such dignity that no one would be ashamed to play it."

== Personal life and death ==
Barlow had a library of approximately 20,000 recordings on 78 rpm and long-playing discs that were donated to The George Sherman Dickinson Music Library at Vassar College in 1965-1966 and added to the existing collection there. He married actress Jeannette Thomas, whose stage name was Ann Winston, on December 12, 1926, in New York City. They were still married when he died at his home in Bethel, Connecticut, on February 1, 1972.

== Recognition ==
In 1936 the Women's National Radio Committee gave Barlow two awards, one for the outstanding sustaining series and the other for the best commercial series. The National Association for American Composers and Conductors presented a Certificate of Merit to Barlow in 1940 for being that year's "outstanding native interpreter of American music".

== Critical response ==
A review in The New York Times of Barlow's debut as guest conductor of the New York Philharmonic-Symphony Orchestra said that it had "a large measure of success". The review cited his knowledge of the music that was performed and his lack of self-consciousness, and it commended his selection of works. Although the review pointed out some flaws in the evening's performance, it concluded, "For the concert as a whole one has to thank Mr. Barlow for the novelty of his program, his musicianly treatment of it, his evident talent and understanding in the treatment of his scores. He was well received."
