= Jidi Majia =

Chinese writer and politician of Yi ethnicity (born 1961)

Jidi Majia (poet)
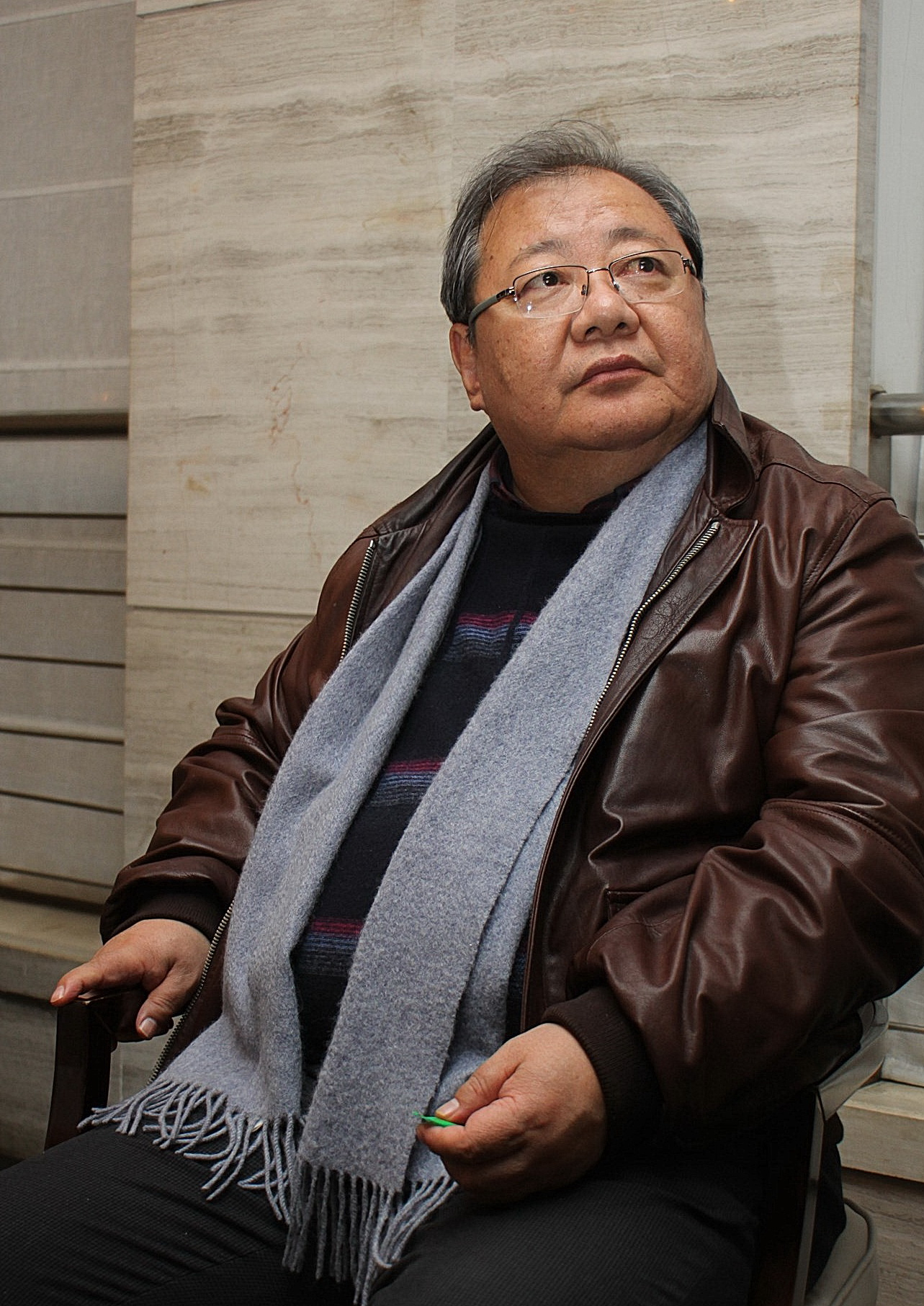
- Jidi Majia (2017)
- Born: 1961 (age 64–65); Sichuan, China
- Occupation: Poet,
- Writing career
- Genre: poetry

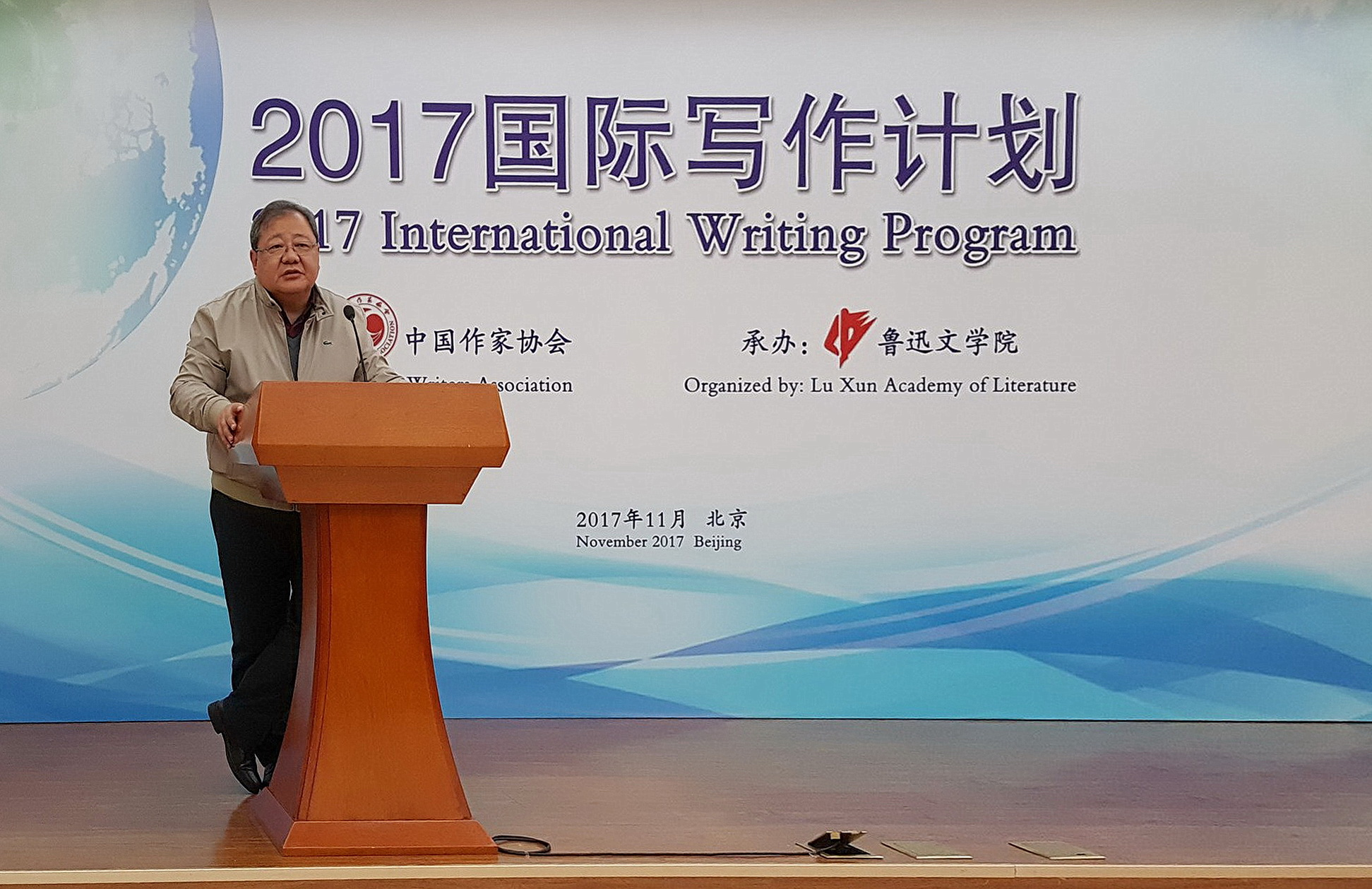
Jidi Majia during opening ceremony of The 1st International Writing Program in Beijing (2017)

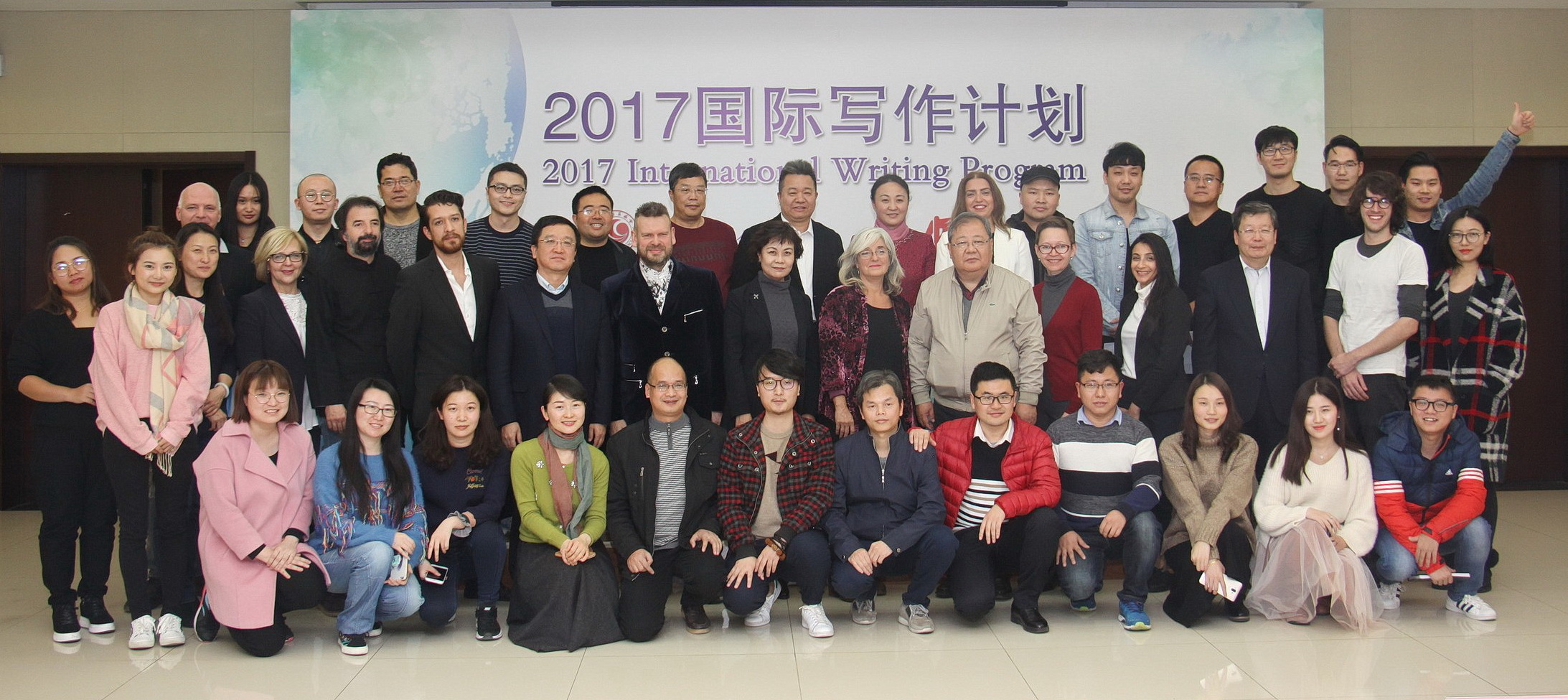
Tie Ning, Jidi Majia, Nurduran Duman, J.Pijarowski and many more of international and Chinese guests during opening ceremony of The 1st International Writing Program in Beijing (2017)

Jidi Majia (simplified Chinese: 吉狄马加; traditional Chinese: 吉狄馬加; pinyin: Jídí mǎjiā) is a Chinese poet and a lieutenant governor of Qinghai from 2006 to 2010. He was born in 1961 and belongs to an ethnic minority of China, the Yi. He has published numerous poetic anthologies since the 1980s and has won national literature awards, is also considered one of the greatest poets of minorities in China. He is the President of the China Minority Literary Association and Permanent Vice-president of the China Poets' Association.

He was mentored by the poet Ai Qing and gained national attention when his collection "Song of Love" won the Third China National Poetry Prize in 1986. His work has been translated into many languages, and he has been awarded numerous international prizes, including the Sholokhov Memorial Medal for Literature in 2006 from the Russian Writers Association, and a Certificate for Outstanding Contributions in Poetry from the Bulgarian Writers Association that same year.

His book of poems My First Love won the National Poetry Prize of China. The Dream of a Yi native won the fourth Literary Prize of China Minorities for poetry. He is a president of the Qinghai International Poetry Festival, which is held on the shores of Asia's largest lake, the Lake of the Gods, at the confluence of the Yellow River and the Yangtze, and has also participated in the International Poetry Festival of Medellín.

In 2016 he received HOMER - The European Medal of Poetry and Art.

== Works ==
=== published in China ===
- The Song of My First Love (Sichuan Nationalities Publishing House;1985);《初恋的歌》;1985;四川民族出版社
- The Dream of a Yi Native (China Nationalities Publishing House; 1990);《一个彝人的梦想》;1990;民族出版社
- The Sun in Rome (Sichuan Nationalities Publishing House;1991);《罗马的太阳》;1991;四川民族出版社
- Selected Poems by Jidi Majia (published in Yi language;Sichuan Nationalities Publishing House;1992);《吉狄马加诗选译》（彝文版）;1992;四川民族出版社
- A Poetry Anthology of Jidi Majia (Sichuan Literature and Art Publishing House;1992);《吉狄马加诗选》;1992;四川文艺出版社
- The Buried Words (Guizhou People's Publishing House;1998);《遗忘的词》;1998;贵州人民出版社
- A Selection of Jidi Majia's Short Poems (Hong Kong Milky Way Press; 2003);《吉狄马加短诗选》; 2003;香港银河出版社
- Poems of Jidi Majia (Sichuan Literature and Art Publishing House; 2004);《吉狄马加的诗》; 2004;四川文艺出版社
- Time (Yunnan People's Publishing House; 2006);《时间》; 2006;云南人民出版社
- Jidi Majia's Poems and Essays (People's Literature Publishing House; 2007);《吉狄马加的诗与文》; 2007;人民文学出版社
- The Hawk's Wings and the Sun (Writers Press；2009);《鹰翅与太阳》; 2009; 作家出版社
- A Collection of Jidi Majia's Speeches (Sichuan Literature and Art Publishing House; 2011);《吉狄马加演讲集》; 2011;四川文艺出版社
- For the Land and Life (Qinghai People's Publishing House; 2011);《为土地和生命而写作——吉狄马加访谈及随笔集》; 2011; 青海人民出版社
- Poems of Jidi Majia (revised edition; Sichuan Literature and Art Publishing House; 2012);《吉狄马加的诗》; 2012;（补充版）四川文艺出版社
- Identity (Jiangsu Literature and Art Publishing House; 2013);《身份》; 2013;江苏文艺出版社
- A Collections of Poems by Jidi Majia (Jiangsu Literature and Art Publishing House; 2013);《诗歌集》; 2013;江苏文艺出版社
- Flames and Words (Foreign Language Teaching and Research Press; 2013);《火焰与词语》; 2013;外语教学与研究出版社
- For the Land and Life (Foreign Language Teaching and Research Press; 2013);《为土地和生命而写作——吉狄马加演讲集》; 2013;外语教学与研究出版社
- I Snow Leopard... (Foreign Language Teaching and Research Press; 2014);《我，雪豹......》; 2014;外语教学与研究出版社
- Between Snow Leopard and Mayakovsky (Yangtze River Literature and Art Publishing House; 2016);《从雪豹到马雅可夫斯基》; 2016;长江文艺出版社
- Poems Selected by JidiMajia (Yunnan People's Publishing House, 2017);《吉狄马加自选诗》; 2017;云南人民出版社
- Place Closest to White Clouds (Sino-culture Press, 2017);《与白云最近的地方》; 2017;华文出版社
- 24 Sonnets to Mother (China Children's Press and Publication Group, 2017);《献给妈妈的二十首十四行诗》; 2017;中国少儿出版社
- Listen to get her with Mountains:Interviews with Jidi Majia (Jiangsu Phoenix Literature and Art Publishing, LTD);《与群山一起聆听——吉狄马加访谈集》; 2017;凤凰文艺出版社

=== published in foreign countries ===
- At the Ends of the Earth (Le Improntedegli Uccelli, Rome, Italy; 2005);Le Improntedegli Uccelli 译者：VilmaCostantini (康薇玛)外版名称：Dove Finisce La Terra 出版时间：2005, ISBN 88-89610-00-X
- Chord of Sleep (The State Press, Bulgaria; 2005);保加利亚语版诗集外方出版社：保加利亚国家作家出版社译者：Христо Караславов,Полина Тинчева (赫里斯托·卡拉斯拉沃夫、波莉娜·廷切娃译)外版名称：акорднасъня (《"睡"的和弦》)对应中文《时间》出版时间：2005;ISBN 954-443-487-9
- The Eyes of the Autumn (Makavej, Macedonia; 2006);马其顿语诗集外方出版社：Makavej (马其顿共和国斯科普里学院出版社)译者：特拉扬·彼德洛夫斯基 外版：очитенаесента; 出版时间：2006;ISBN 9989-164-08-8
- A Selection of Jidi Majia's Poems (publisher:The Autumn of Poetry, Serbia Smederev International Poetry Festival; 2006);塞尔维亚语版诗歌选集外方出版社："斯姆德雷沃诗歌之秋"国际诗歌节出版译者：Драган Драrojловиh 外版名称：ПЕСМЕ 出版时间：2006;ISBN 86-84201-30-2
- TIME (Foibos, Czech; 2006)；捷克语版诗集 外方出版社：Foibos (捷克芳博斯文化公司)译者：Jan Cimický 外版名称：Čas出版时间：2006;ISBN 80-903661-9-8
- Song of the Yi (Projekt Verlag, Germany; 2007); 德语版诗集 外方出版社：Projekt Verlag译者：Peter Hoffmann 彼得·霍夫曼外版名称：Gesange Der Yi出版时间：2007;ISBN 978-3-89733-166-2
- The Yi Nationality (Voice of China Broadcasting Co. Ltd., UK, 2007);
- TIME (Librairie de Youfeng, France; 2007); 法语版诗集 外方出版社：LibrairiedeYoufeng (友丰书店)译者：Sandrine Alexandre 外版名称：Temps 出版时间：2007, ISBN 978-2-84279-337-1
- TIME (Wydawnictwo Adam Marszałek, Poland; 2007);波兰语版诗集 外方出版社：Wydawnictwo: Adam Marszałek 译者：Marek Wawrzkiewicz、Peter Tabora 外版名称：Magiczna Ziemia 出版时间：2007, ISBN 978-83-7441-622-1
- TIME (La Castalia, Venezuela; 2008); 西班牙语版诗集 (委内瑞拉出版)外方出版社：La Castalia 译者：J.M. Briceno Guerrero，赵振江外版名称：Tiempo 出版时间：2008;
- TIME (홍정선김수영, Korea; 2009); 韩语版诗集 外方出版社：홍정선김수영 (韩国文学与知性出版社)译者：백지훈 外版名称：시간对应中文《时间》出版时间：2009, ISBN 978-89-320-1971-0
- TIME (Proa American Editores, Argentina; 2011); 西班牙语版诗集 (阿根廷出版)外方出版社：Pro American Editores 译者：Chiti Matya 外版名称：Tiempo 出版时间：2011; ISBN 978-987-1766-39-0
- Words of Flame (Corporaciode Artey Poesia Prometeo, Columbia; 2013); 西班牙语版诗集 (哥伦比亚出版)外方出版社：Corporaciode Arte y Poesia Prometeo 译者：Leon Blanco 外版名称：Palabras de Fuego,出版时间：2013; Este libro se imprimioenlostalleres de Cajas y Empaques de Colombia linea editorial Medellin—Colombia 2013;
- TIME (Гипepиoh, St. Petersburg, Russia; 2013); 俄语版诗集外方出版社：Гипepиoh (吉彼里昂出版社)译者：Д.А. Дерепа, перевод 外版名称：время 出版时间：2013; ISBN 978-5-89332-219-4
- Rhapsody in Black (University of Oklahoma Press, United States; 2014); 英语版诗集 外方出版社：University of Oklahoma Press (美国)译者：Denis Mair 外版名称：Rhapsody in Black 出版时间：2014, ISBN 978-0-8061-4449-8
- Rhapsody in Black (Объединённоегуманитарноеиздательство, Russia; 2014); 俄语版诗集 外方出版社：Объединённоегуманитарноеиздательство (俄罗斯联合人文出版社)译者：李英男、李雅兰外版名称：Чёрная рапсодия 出版时间：2014; ISBN 978-5-94282-746-5
- For the Landand Life (Corporation of Art and Poetry Prometeo, Columbia; 2014);西班牙语版演讲集 (哥伦比亚出版)外方出版社：Corporation of Art and Poetry Prometeo (哥伦比亚)译者：Rafael Patiño Góez 外版名, En El Nombredela Tierrayde la Vida 出版时间：2014; ISBN 978-958-95862-5-9
- For the Land and Life (LIBRERIA ORIENTALIA, Italy; 2014); 意大利语版演讲集外方出版社：LIBRERIA ORIENTALIA 译者：Laura Cassanelli 吕晶 外版名称：Scrittiper la Terraeper la Vita—Discorsiscelti 出版时间：2014; ISBN 978-88-96851-08-1
- Words of Flame (MEMOIRED’ENCRIERINC, Canada; 2014);法语版诗集 (加拿大出版)外方出版社：MEMOIRED’ENCRIERINC 译者：Françoise Roy 外版名称：Paroles de Feu 出版时间：2014, ISBN 978-2-89712-223-2
- Words of Flame (THE EUROPEAN IDEA CULTURAL FOUNDATION, Romania; 2014); 罗马尼亚语版诗集 外方出版社：THE EUROPEAN IDEA CULTURAL FOUNDATION, 译者：Constantin Lupeanu (鲁博安)，Andrian Daniel Lupeanu 外版名; 称：Flacarasi Cuvant 出版时间：2014, ISBN 978-606-594-261-5
- Words of Flame (DARAL-SAQI, Lebanon; 2014); 阿拉伯语版诗集 (黎巴嫩出版)外方出版社：DAR AL-SAQI 译者：Sayed Gouda 外版名称：وكلماتلهيبنار出版时间：2014, ISBN 978-6-14425-786-9
- Words of Flame (Boolean Cik Literature Club, Bosnia and Herzegovina; 2014); 塞尔维亚语诗集 (波黑出版) 外方出版社：KNJIZEVNI KLUB BRCKO DISTRIKT (波黑)译者：Zarko Milenic 外版名称：Rijeci Vatre出版时间：2014; ISBN 978-9958-644-33-7
- Shade of Our Mountain Range (UHURUDESIGNSTUDIO (PTY) LTD, South Africa; 2014); 英语版诗集 (南非出版)外方出版社：UHURUDESIGNSTUDIO (PTY)LTD 译者：Denis Mair 外版名称：Shade of our Mountain Range 出版时间：2014; ISBN 978-0-620-64264-4
- Poetry-Tool and Witness to China's Renaissance (UHURUDESIGN STUDIO (PTY)LTD, South Africa; 2014); 英语版演讲集 (南非出版)外方出版社：UHURUDESIGNSTUDIO (PTY)LTD 译者：Denis Mair 外版名称：Poetry-Tool and Witness to China's Renaissance 出版时间：2014, ISBN 978-0-620-64169-2
- Words of Flame (NayaUdyog, India; 2015); 孟加拉语版诗集外方出版社：NayaUdyog (印度)译者：Ashis Sanyal 外版名称：孟加拉语不会拼，对应的英文名称：Words of Fire 出版时间：2015; ISBN 978-81-89863-62-3
- For the Land and Life (THE EUROPEAN IDEA CULTURAL FOUNDATION, Romania; 2015); 罗马尼亚语版演讲集 外方出版社：THE EUROPEAN IDEA CULTURAL FOUNDATION 译者：Maria-Ana Tupan 外版名称：In Numele Pamentului Sial Vietii 出版时间：2015;ISBN 978-81-89863-62-3
- Words of Flame (Colleccion Sur Editores, Cuba; 2015); 西班牙语版诗集 (古巴出版)外方出版社：Union de Escritoresy Artistas de Cuba 译者：Françoise Roy 外版名称：Palabras de Fuego 出版时间：2015; ISBN 978-959-302-160-9
- For the Land and Life (Lockerverlag, Austria; 2015); 德语版演讲集 外方出版社：LÖCKERVERLAG (奥地利)译者：Claudia Kotte 外版名称：Im Namen Von Land Und Leben 出版时间：2015, ISBN 978-3-85409-747-1
- Words of Flame (Lockerverlag, Austria; 2015); 德语版诗集 外方出版社：LÖCKERVERLAG (奥地利)译者：Helmuth A.Niederle 外版名称：Worte Des Feuers 出版时间：2015; ISBN 978-3-85409-735-8
- Words of Flame (Society of Dekata, Greece; 2015); 希腊语版诗集外方出版社：Society of Dekata 译者：Yorgos Blanas 外版名称：Λόγιατηςφωτιάς 出版时间：2015, ISBN 978-618-5179-00-7
- Identity (Editori Riuniti, Italy; 2015); 意大利语版诗集 外方出版社：EDITORI INT.RIUNITI 译者：Rosa Lombardi 外版名称：Identica 出版时间：2015; ISBN 978-618-5179-00-7
- Words of Flame (Vogi Nairi, Armenia; 2015); 亚美尼亚语版诗集外方出版社：Vogi-Nairi, Arts Center译者：Kristine Balayan, Hrant Alexanian; 外版名称：ՀՐԵՂԵՆԽՈՍՔԵՐ 出版时间：2015; ISBN 978-9939-1-0265-8
- For the Landand Life (Mémoired'Encrier, Canada; 2015); 法语版演讲集 (加拿大出版)外方出版社：MEMOIRED’ENCRIERINC 译者：Françoise Roy 外版名称：Au Nomde la Terreet de la Vie 出版时间：2015; ISBN 978-2-89712-226-3
- Words of Flame (TEKİNYAYINDAĞITIM, Turkey; 2015); 土耳其语版诗集 外方出版社：TEKİNYAYINDAĞITIMSAN.TİC.LTD.ŞTİ. 译者：Ataol Behramoglu 外版名称：Gokveyerarasinda出版时间：2015; ISBN 978-9944-61-105-3
- Words of Flame (DIALOG, Poland; 2015); 波兰语版诗集外方出版社：Dialog 译者：Malgorzata Religa 外版名称：Słowa Płomieni 出版时间：2015; ISBN 978-83-8002-331-4
- Words of Flame (Valparaíso Ediciones, Spain; 2015); 西班牙语版诗集 (西班牙出版)外方出版社：Valparaíso Ediciones 译者：Françoise Roy 外版名称：Palabras de Fuego 出版时间：2015;ISBN 978-84-944158-5-2
- For the Landand Life (Knjizevni Klub Brcko, Bosnia and Herzegovina; 2015); 塞尔维亚语版演讲集 (波黑出版)外方出版社：KNJIZEVNI KLUB BRCKO DISTRIKT (波黑)译者：Zarko Milenic 外版名称：UIme Zemlje Zivota出版时间：2015, ISBN 978-9958-644-42-9
- Words of Flame (Twaweza Communications Ltd., Kenya; 2015); 斯瓦西里语版诗集 (肯尼亚出版)外方出版社：Twaweza Communications Ltd 译者;Philo Ikonya 外版名称：ManenoY Moto Kutoka China, 出版时间：2015; ISBN 978-9966-028-57-0
- I Snow Leopard (Manoa Books, United States; 2016); 英文版诗集《我，雪豹......》外方出版社：Manoa Books 译者：Frank Stewart; 外版名称：I Snow Leopard; 出版时间：2016; ISBN 978-0-9891277-4-5
- Words of Flame (DAUPHIN, Czech; 2016); 捷克语版诗集 外方出版社：DAUPHIN 译者：Zuzana Li 外版名称：Slovav Plamenech 出版时间：2016;ISBN 978-80-7272-759-9;ISBN 978-80-7272-760-5 (PDF);ISBN 978-80-7272-761-2 (ePUB)
- An Eternal Rite (Biblioteka Tematu, Poland; 2016); 波兰语版诗集外方出版社：Biblioteka Tematu 译者：Dariusz Tomasz Lebioda 外版名称：Ryty Wieczności 出版时间：2016,ISBN 978-83-65150-27-1
- Rhapsody in Black (Pardes Publishing, Israel; 2016); 希伯来语版诗集 外方出版社：Pardes Publishing (以色列)译者：Amir Or 外版名称：רפסודיהבשחור出版时间：2016; ISBN 978-1-61838-284-9
- TIME (Ars Orientalis, Estonia; 2016); 爱沙尼亚语版诗集外方出版社：ARS ORIENTALIS 译者：Jüri Talvet 外版名称：Aeg 出版时间：2016; ISBN 978-9949-81-207-3
- Rhapsody in Black (Durieux, Croatia; 2016); 克罗地亚语版诗集外方出版社：Durieux 译者：Miloš Djurdjević 外版名称：Rapsodiiau Crnom;出版时间; 2016;ISBN 978-953-188-436-5
- Identity (Aurora Publishing, UK; 2016);英语版诗集 (英国出版)外方出版社：Aurora Publishing 译者：Qian Kunqiang 外版名称：Identity;出版时间：2016; ISBN 978-1-908647-78-8
- Rhapsody in Black (Editorial Galaxia, Spain; 2016);加里西亚语诗集外方出版社：EDITORIAL GALAXIA;译者：Francisco Alberto Pombo; 外版名称：Rapsodia en Negro出版时间：2016;ISBN 978-84-9151-024-6
- The Color of Heaven (THE EUROPEAN IDEA CULTURAL FOUNDATION, Romania; 2016);罗马尼亚语版诗集 外方出版社：THE EUROPEAN IDEA CULTURAL FOUNDATION 译者：Constantin Lupeanu (鲁博安)外版名称：Culoarea Paradisului (中文意为：天堂的色彩，即中文版诗集《从雪豹到马雅可夫斯基》)出版时间：2016; ISBN 978-606-594-502-9
- Én, ahópárduc–Jidi Majia válogatottversei (MAGYAR PEN CLUB, Hungary; 2017); 匈牙利语诗集 (布达佩斯出版)外方出版社：MAGYAR PEN CLUB (匈牙利笔会)译者：芭尔涛·艾丽卡、拉茨·彼得、苏契·盖佐审校：余泽民;出版时间：2017; ISBN 978-7-5135-4937-0
- Poetry and Artwork Collection of Jidi Majia (Cambridge Rivers Press, UK; 2017);
- FROM THE SNOW LEOPARD TO MAYAKOVSKY (Kallatumba Press, San Francisco, US; 2017); 英语版诗集 (美国旧金山)外方出版社：Kallatumba Press (阿尔巴尼亚语：倾倒出版社)译者：Denis Mair 外版名称：FROM THE SNOW LEOPARD TO MAYAKOVSKY 出版时间：2017;
- تاملكلاران (EDITIONS LA CROISEE DES CHEMINS, Morocco; 2017); 阿拉伯语版诗集 外方出版社：摩洛哥十字路口 (EDITIONS LA CROISEE DES CHEMINS)出版社 译者：Jalal El Hakmaoui 外版名称：نارالكلمات出版时间：2017;
- شتآناگژاوزایراعشاویفربگنلپ،نم (OSTOORE PUBLISHER, Iran; 2017);波兰语版诗集 外方出版社：伊朗OSTOOREPUBLISHER出版社译者：Abolghasem Esmaeil pour Motlagh 外版名称：من،پلنگبرفیواشعاریازواژگانآتش出版时间：2017;
- Immortality (Foreign Publishing House: United and Humanitie Press:2017);俄语版诗集外方出版社：联合人文出版社 译者：李英男、李雅兰、顾宇、谢尔盖·托洛普采夫、阿列克谢·菲利莫诺夫 外版名称：Ушедший в бессмертие 出版时间：2017; ISBN 978-5-94282-814-1
- Acourt in the Starry Sky of the Red Lion (Foreign Publishing House: AUSTRIA PEN CLUB; 2017);德语版诗集 外方出版社：AUSTRIA PEN CLUB (奥地利笔会)译者：赫尔穆特·A·聂德乐 外版名称：DERRACHEN DES ROTEN LÖWEN IN DER STERN- KAMMERDER GEDANKEN 出版时间：2017; ISBN 978-3-85409-887-4
- Jag är nosu in translation by Freke Räihä, Smockadoll förlag, 2021 ISBN 978-91-89099-14-2
- Antologia di poesia cinese contemporanea 当代中国诗歌集（Delufa Press 德陆法出版社: Italia, 2025) ; traduzione di Francesco De Luca 译者：德陆法；ISBN 979-12-985289-4-9

== Awards ==
- Self-portrait and Other was awarded as the top prize for poetry (The 2nd China National Literature Prize for Minority, 1985);
- Hunter's World was awarded prize for Poetry Creative Writing 1994 – 1995 (Star Poetry; 1986);
- The Song of My First Love was awarded as the best poetry anthology (The 3rd China National Prize for Poetry, 1988);
- Twelve Poems by Jidi Majia was awarded Sichuan Literature Prize (1988);
- The Song of My First Love was awarded the honorary award of Guo Moruo Prize for Literature (1988);
- Self-portrait and Other was awarded the honorary award of Guo Moruo Prize for Literature (1988);
- The Dream of a Yi Native was awarded Morning Star Lily Prize (National Literature of China Writers Association; 1989);
- The Sun in Rome was awarded Sichuan Minority Literature Prize (1992);
- The Dream of a Yi Native was awarded Prize for Poetry Anthology (The 4th China National Prize for Minority Literary;1993);
- Zhuangzhong Literature Prize (China,1994);
- Sholokhov Memorial Medal for Literature (Russian Writers Association, Russia 2006);
- Special Certificate (Bulgarian Writers Association, Bulgaria, 2006);
- Award for Annual Poets (Poetry Monthly, China; 2011);
- Certificate of Honour issued by the organizing committee of "Autumn of Warsaw "International Poetry Festival in the seminar titled "Jidi Majia's Poetry in the Global Vision" (Beijing，2011);
- Rougang Literature Prize (China, 2012);
- Certificate of Honour and Medal awarded by Peru Trujillo State University in the commemorative activity for César Vallejo’s 120 Anniversary (2012);
- Lifetime Achievement Award for Yi Poetry (China, 2014);
- Mkhiva Humanitarian Award (South Africa; 2014);
- Poem "I' Snow Leopard…" was awarded annual prize (People's Literature, China, 2014);
- Gold Award for Master Soul of Chinese Poetry (16 th International Chinese Poets Pen; 2015);
- HOMER - The European Medal of Poetry and Art (2016);
- Award for Poetry (China, October Monthly, 2016);
- Li Bai and Du Fu Prize for Poetry (China, 2016);
- Award for Outstanding Poets (The Contemporary People magazine, Romania; 2016);
- Prize for Poetry (Romania Bucharest Writers Association, 2016)
- Poetry Prize of Bucharest City (The Bucharest International Poetry Festival, Romania, 2017)
- Ianicius Prize (Poland, 2017)
- Lifetime Achievement Award of Xu Zhimo Poetry Prize (King's College), University of Cambridge, UK, 2017)

== See also ==
- Chinese literature
