= Saturday Night Serenade =

American radio music series (1936–1948)

- Other names: The Pet Milk Show
- Genre: Popular music
- Running time: 30 minutes
- Country of origin: United States
- Language: English
- Syndicates: CBS; NBC
- Starring: Mary Eastman; Jessica Dragonette; Kay Armen; Hollace Shaw; Bill Perry; Vic Damone
- Announcer: Bill Adams; Warren Sweeney; Bob Trout
- Produced by: Roland Martini; Helen Ward
- Original release: October 3, 1936 – September 25, 1948

Saturday Night Serenade is an American old-time radio program that featured popular music. The 30-minute program was broadcast on CBS on Saturday nights from October 3, 1936, until September 25, 1948, sponsored by Pet Milk. In 1948, the show moved to NBC, and the name was changed to The Pet Milk Show,

Female singers who starred on the program included Mary Eastman, Jessica Dragonette, Kay Armen, and Hollace Shaw. Their male counterparts included Bill Perry and Vic Damone, For one interval, the individual vocalists were replaced by the Emil Cote Singers. Guest vocalists were also featured at times. They included Ruby Mercer.

Howard Barlow led the orchestra in 1936–1937, with Gus Haenschen conducting thereafter. Announcers were Bill Adams, Warren Sweeney, and Bob Trout. Producers were Roland Martini and (during the Damone-Armen years) Helen Ward.
