= Hollace Shaw =

American coloratura soprano (1913–1976)

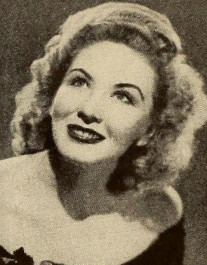
- Hollace Shaw (1947)
- Born: Hollace Shaw; July 24, 1913; Fresno, California
- Died: March 2, 1976 (aged 62); Los Angeles, California
- Education: Pomona College
- Occupation: Singer
- Spouse(s): Major Clarence Turner Foster (1944–?); Dr. Frederick C. Schlumberger (?–1976, her death)

Hollace Shaw (July 24, 1913 – March 2, 1976) was a coloratura soprano who performed on old-time radio and on the stage.

== Early years ==
Shaw was born in Fresno, California. Her father, Rev. Shirley R. Shaw, was a minister, and her mother was a concert singer. She was the oldest of five children, one of whom was Robert Shaw, who founded the Robert Shaw Chorale and directed symphony orchestras in Atlanta, Georgia, and Cleveland, Ohio.

== Radio ==
Shaw was a featured soloist on Blue Velvet Music, Saturday Night Serenade and the featured female soloist on Song Time and was a member of the cast of The Hour of Charm, on which she was known as "Vivian." She also had her own weekly program on CBS.

== Stage ==
Shaw's Broadway credits include Higher and Higher (1939) and Very Warm for May (1939). The latter production included her introduction of the song All the Things You Are.

== Personal appearances ==
Shaw sang frequently with symphony orchestras around the United States and at Radio City Music Hall, in New York City. She also performed in night clubs. Eugene Burr wrote about Shaw in a review in Billboard's October 12, 1940, issue: "She has an outstanding voice, one of the few real voices that have been developed in recent years..."

== Personal life ==
On April 12, 1944, Shaw married Clarence Turner Foster, a major in the Air Transport Command, in New York, New York. She later married Dr. Frederick C. Schlumberger, a surgeon.

== Death ==
Shaw died March 2, 1976, in Los Angeles, California, at age 62. She was survived by her husband, two stepchildren, a sister and two brothers.
