= Sona Van =

Armenian poet (born 1952)

- Born: Sona Ter-Hovhannisyan; 1952 (age 73–74) Yerevan, Armenian Soviet Socialist Republic
- Occupation: Poet
- Notable works: Libretto for the Desert

Sona Anushavani Ter-Hovhannisyan (Armenian: Սոնա Անուշավանի Տեր-Հովհաննիսյան; born 1952), best known by the pen name Sona Van (Սոնա Վան), is an Armenian American poet. She is recognized for her work addressing the Armenian genocide.

== Biography ==
Sona Van was born Sona Ter-Hovhannisyan in Yerevan, Armenia, in 1952. Her grandparents and parents had at one point been forced to leave Armenia due to the Armenian Genocide. Van formally trained as a doctor at Yerevan State Medical University, and she also holds a master's degree in psychology.

In 1978, she moved to the United States, settling in California. In the United States, she worked as a doctor and psychologist while also pursuing a poetry career. Her first collection, Rays of Light, was published in 1996. In 2006, she founded the literary journal Narcissus with the poet and playwright Vahan Vardanyan, and she has served as editor in chief of the publication since 2013.

Her work frequently discusses the violence of the Armenian Genocide, aiming to raise awareness of the genocide in the English-speaking world.

Van has published at least four poetry collections, including Parallel Sleeplessness (2010). Libretto for the Desert, a poetry collection that deals specifically with the genocide, is her best-known work, and it has been translated into 23 languages. Her work was also included in the 2017 anthology of 25 contemporary Armenian poets Armenia’s Heart: Poems … and Nothing More.

She has been the recipient of HOMER - The European Medal of Poetry and Art. In 2019, she received the International Maria Konopnicka Prize alongside Beata Poźniak, an actress who has produced recordings of Van's work. She has also received a gold medal from the Ministry of Culture of Armenia, as well as the Movses Khorenatsi medal.
