= Mary Eastman (singer) =

American soprano

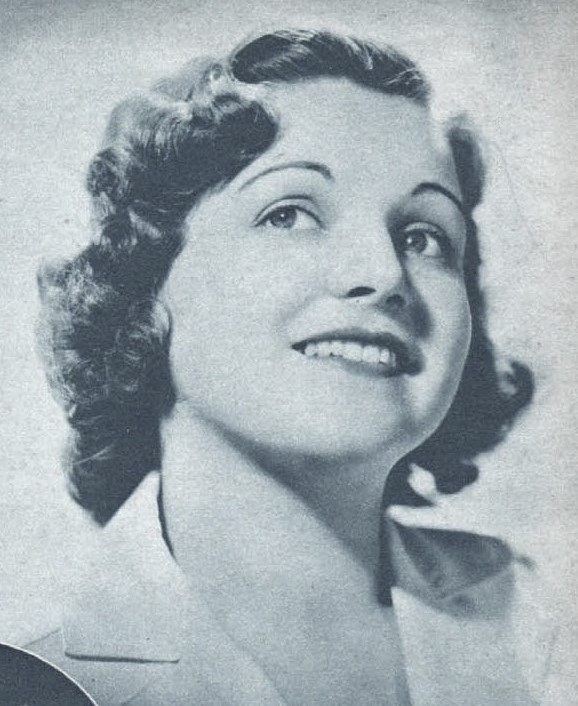
- Mary Eastman in 1937
- Born: Mary Hewitt; July 21, 1911; Kansas City, Missouri, U.S.
- Died: February 21, 1969 (aged 57); Delray Beach, Florida, U.S.
- Education: Juilliard School
- Occupation: singer
- Spouse: Lee Semmes Eastman
- Children: 2

Mary Hewitt Tippett Eastman (born July 21, 1911) was an American lyric soprano and "a highly popular performer" on radio.

== Early years ==
Eastman was born Mary Hewitt on July 21, 1911, in Kansas City, Missouri. When she was a child she went to live with her uncle and, at his request, began calling him "Father". In 1937 she said, "In fact, hardly anyone knows to this day that he's not my real father." The announcement of her marriage said that she was the daughter of Mr. and Mrs. John F. Tippett. Tippett was president of International Products Corporation, and she was of French and English descent.

Eastman's mother was a singer who performed on radio in its early days. Her siblings were all musically talented, and she could play piano by age 7 although she had no lessons on the instrument. She was more interested in singing, however. Her family could not afford vocal lessons, but her uncle provided that opportunity. He was moving from South America to Chicago, and he offered to take her with him so that she could study music there, which she did. That move led to her taking her uncle's last name and looking on him as her father. She began taking vocal lessons at age 10, and she studied for three years at Chicago Musical College. Her studies there ended when her uncle had to move to New York, and she accompanied him. In New York she studied music under Frank La Forge, and attended the Juilliard School.

== Career ==
Eastman performed in stage productions and in concerts before debuting on radio in 1930. Her Broadway debut also occurred in 1930 with her performance in the musical revue Shoot the Works. She began singing on CBS in 1932. From 1938 to 1941 she was the featured female singer on Saturday Night Serenade. Other programs on which she sang included The Ford Summer Hour, Waltz Time, Melody Masterpiece, and Voice of America. In 1938 Eastman signed a contract with the World Broadcasting System to make a series of transcriptions of operettas. She began using Eastman as her professional name when she began performing with Lawrence Tibbett. The similar sounds of their last names led to a coin toss to determine which one would change. Tibbett won the toss, so Mary Tippett began performing as Mary Eastman.

By 1939, Eastman's repertoire included:

- 53 major arias from 19 operas in French, German, Italian, and Russian
- more than 200 songs from Beethoven, Brahms, Borodine, Debussy, Moussorgasky, Ravel, Schubert, Richard Strauss, and Tchaikovsky
- songs written by George Gershwin, Victor Herbert, Jerome Kern, Sigmund Romberg, and Sir Arthur Sullivan
- then-current popular songs from Hollywood and Tin Pan Alley.

== Personal life and death ==
She married Lee Semmes Eastman, an executive with the Packard Motor Car Company, on August 8, 1932, in New Rochelle, New York. They had two children, a daughter and a son.

On February 21, 1969, Eastman died at the age of 57 at Bethesda Hospital in Delray Beach, Florida, of injuries sustained 11 days earlier in an automobile accident in that city, where she and Lee Eastman had maintained a winter residence. Survived by her husband and children, as well as two brothers and two sisters, her funeral was held—and her remains interred—in Greenwich, Connecticut, where the Eastmans had resided during the rest of the year.
