= Tim Lilburn =

Canadian poet and essayist

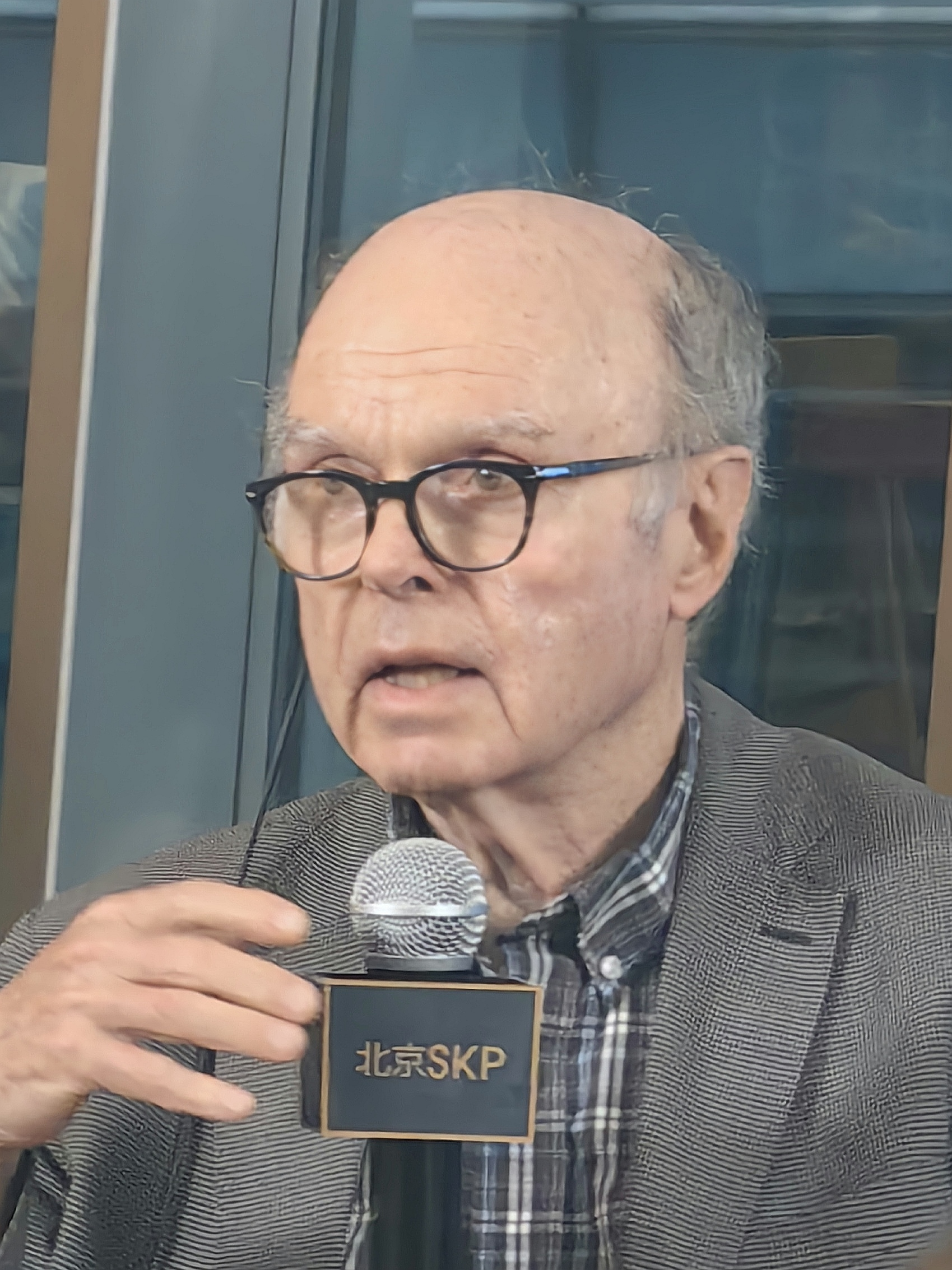
- Born: June 27, 1950 (age 76); Regina, Saskatchewan, Canada
- Occupations: poet, essayist

Tim Lilburn (born 27 June 1950) is a Canadian poet and essayist. Lilburn was born in Regina, Saskatchewan. He obtained a B.A. from the University of Regina, a Master's Degree in Philosophy from Gonzaga University (during which time he was a member of the Jesuit order), and his PhD from McMaster University.

He is the author of several critically acclaimed collections of poetry, including Kill-site, To the River, Moosewood Sandhills and his latest work Going Home. Successful even in the early stages of his career, Lilburn's second work, Tourist To Ecstasy, was shortlisted for the Governor's General's Award but did not win.

Lilburn's first glimpse of national approval came in 1995, upon receiving the Canadian Authors Association Award for his work on Moosewood Sandhills. In 2002, Lilburn's Living in the World as if it Were Home became the winner of the Saskatchewan Non-Fiction Book of the Year Award and was a finalist for the Saskatoon Book Award. Eventually, Lilburn went on to win the Governor General's Award in 2003 for his book Kill-site. Lilburn's work, although primarily directed towards a Canadian audience, has received global recognition and numerous volumes of his work can be found translated in Chinese, Serbian, German and Polish. He currently teaches writing at the University of Victoria in British Columbia, Canada. In addition to writing his own work, Lilburn is the editor of, and a contributor to, two influential essay collections on poetics, Poetry and Knowing and Thinking and Singing: Poetry and the Practice of Philosophy.

Lilburn was a judge for the 2011 Griffin Poetry Prize.

In 2017 he received HOMER - The European Medal of Poetry and Art

== Later years ==
During the writing of Orphic Politics in 2006, Lilburn's health began to deteriorate. After contracting an auto-immune condition that made walking difficult, he became ill and was hospitalized. Lilburn subsequently underwent a number of surgeries over a two-year period. When interviewed about the experience, Lilburn described his experience as "living in the land of the ill."

== Tim Lilburn & The Environment ==
Moosewood Sandhills - One of Lilburn's earlier works, Moosewood Sandhills is a collection of poetry that intuits a strong sense of locality that is both metaphysical and physical. With due reference to his prairie birthplace, Saskatchewan, Lilburn struggles to find a connection with the desolate world that surrounds him. In an interview with Peter Gzowski on Morningside, Lilburn reveals that he found the sandhills "initially repellent, and too sparse, and yielding," but that the place "completely claimed my imagination, claimed my vision, claimed my love". Lilburn's poetry in Moosewood Sandhills seemingly becomes intertwined with Robert Frost's iconic image of the deer amongst nature, but Lilburn separates himself from Frost's work by taking observance from a different perspective. In Lilburn's poems, lying down seems to encourage kinds of patience and contact unlike those found through that favourite, more familiar activity of nature poets, walking. (Brian Bartlett, "The Grass is Epic: Tim Lilburn's Moosewood Sandhills, in All Manner of Tackle: Living with Poetry [2017]).

To The River - Written at the midpoint of Lilburn's career, To The River follows Lilburn as he returns to the banks of the South Saskatchewan River. Following thematically from Moosewood Sandhills, Lilburn describes his various stages of contemplation in the presence of a particular landscape. Lilburn's writing discusses the strangeness of the inhabitants of the riverscape and contrasts it with his acute familiarity with his local surroundings: willow, geese, river ice, coyote and snowberry.

Going Home - Lilburn continues to explore his previous preoccupations from Living in the World as if Were Home, a book dealing primarily with both ecology and desire. Here Lilburn returns once again to Saskatchewan: "I realized that at forty, although I had been probed by many psychologists, spent eight years in Jesuit formation, read many books, I had done nothing to educate myself to be someone who could live with facility, familiarity, where he was born." He goes on to philosophize about this experience: "We need to find our way to take the place in our mouth; we must re-say our past in such a way that it will gather us here." Lilburn's explorations of his surroundings has clearly helped him to learn to be at home with his world.

== Bibliography ==
- Names of God (1986)
- Tourist To Ecstasy (1989), nominated for the Governor General's Award.
- From the Great Above She Opened Her Ear to the Great Below (1991)
- Moosewood Sandhills (1994)
- To the River (1999), winner of the Saskatchewan Book Award for Book of the Year.
- Living in the World as if it Were Home (2002)
- Kill-site (2003), winner of the Governor General's Award.
- Desire Never Leaves: The Poetry of Tim Lilburn (2006)
- Orphic Politics (2008)
- Going Home: Essays (2008)
- Assiniboia (2012)
- The Names (2016)
- The Larger Conversation: Contemplation and Place (2017)
- Numinous Seditions: Interiority and Climate Change (2023)
