= HOMER - The European Medal of Poetry and Art =

Literary award

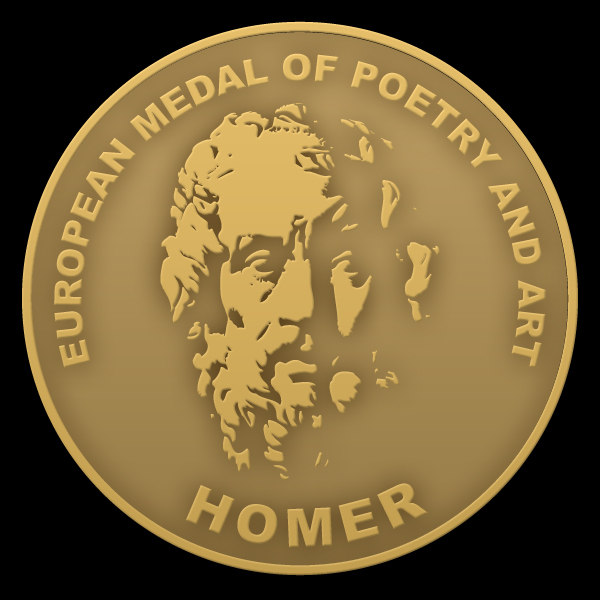
- Obverse of the medal.
- Awarded for: literature
- First award: June 27, 2016; 10 years ago

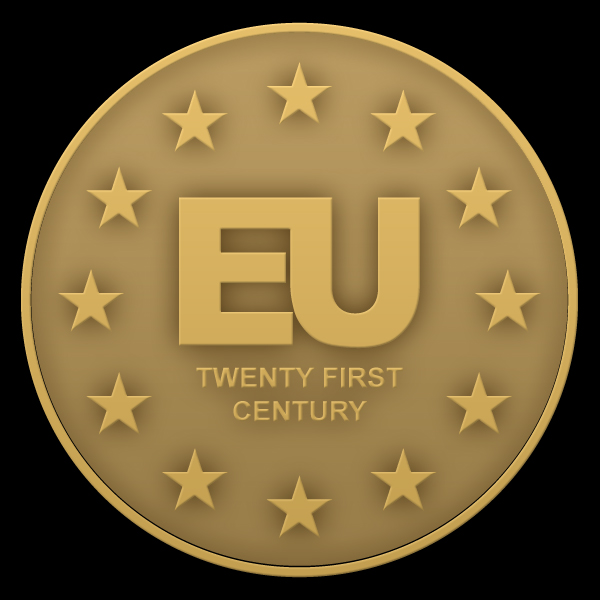
Reverse of the medal

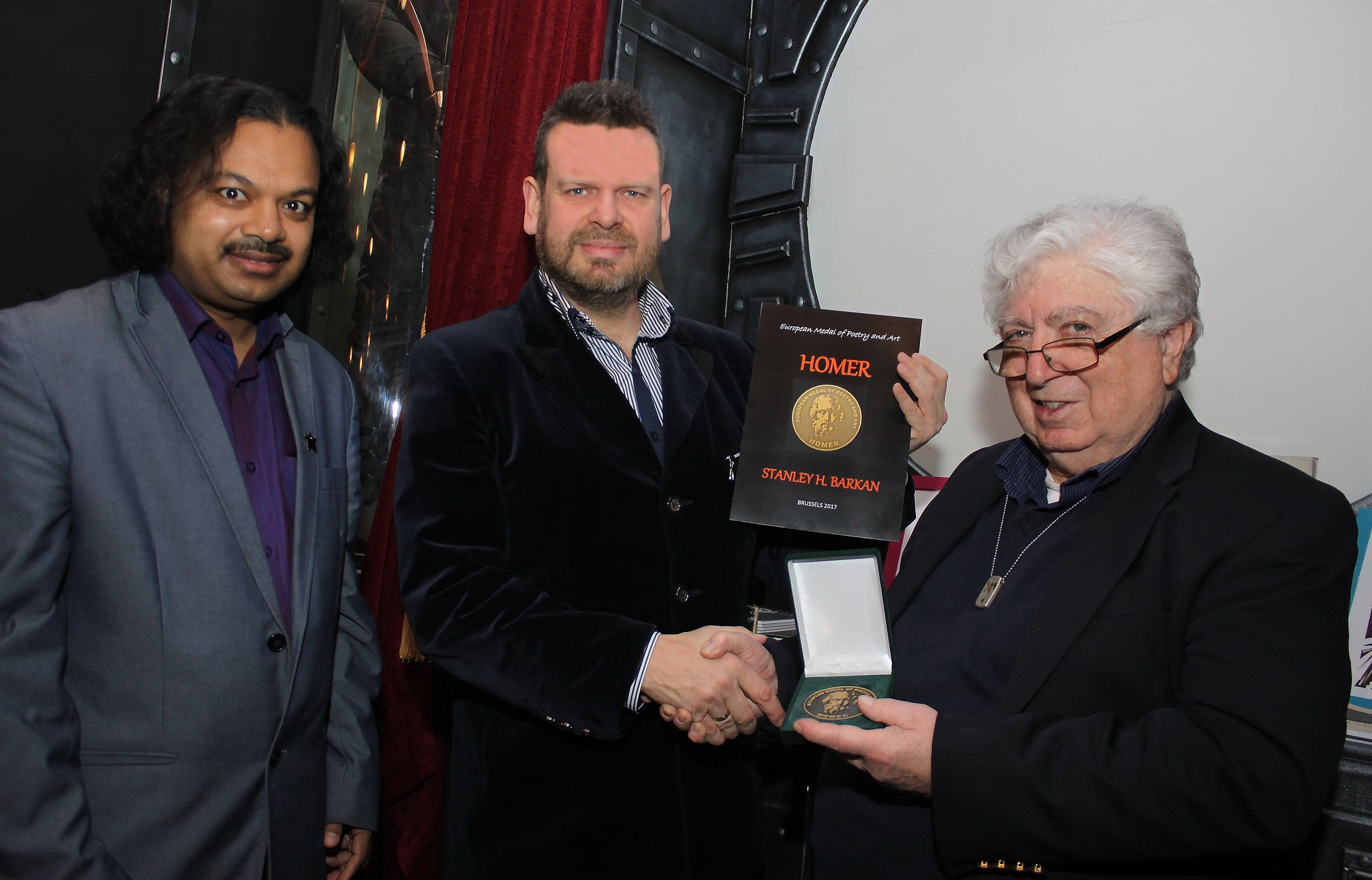
Hassanal Abdullah, Jarosław Pijarowski & Stanley H. Barkan. S H Barkan receives HOMER - The European Medal of Poetry and Art in New York City (2017).

HOMER - The European Medal of Poetry and Art is a medal awarded to outstanding creators in the world of literature. The medal was established in Brussels, Belgium, in 2016. The jury awards artists whose work, with simplicity and beauty, conveys universal messages to the world. The artists are selected on the basis of enriching the "pantheon of their spiritual father, Homer."

== Chamber of medal ==
- Dariusz Tomasz Lebioda,Poland
- Zhao Si Fang,China
- Vania Angelowa,Bulgaria
- Marco Scalabrino, Italy
- Barbara Orlowski, (Germany–Brazil), Brazil
- Angelica Kret, Belgium
- Gulala Nouri (Iraq–Kurdistan), Iraq
- Athanase Vantchev de Thracy, France
- Olimpia Iacob, Romania
- Isaac Goldemberg, (Peru–USA), USA
- Hassanal Abdullah, (Bangladesh–USA), USA
- William Wolak, USA
- Naoshi Koriyama, Japan
- Peter Thabit Jones,Wales
- Sung-Il Lee,South Korea
- Helen Bar-Lev,Israel
- Jarosław Pijarowski, Poland
- Maria Mistrioti, Greece
- Adnan Özer, Turkey
- Sona Van, USA
- Libor Martínek, Czech Republic

== Laureates of medal ==
- Jidi Majia, (China 2016),China
- Gagik Davtian, (Armenia 2016), Armenia
- Ataol Berghamoglu, (Turkey 2016), Turkey
- Stanley H. Barkan, (USA 2017) USA
- Tomas Venclova, (Georgia 2017) Lithuania
- Tim Lilburn, (Canada 2017) Canada
- Sultan Catto, (USA 2018) USA
