= D. H. Melhem =

American writer (1926–2013)

Diana M. Vogel

Diana M. Vogel (1926 – 2013), known professionally as D. H. Melhem, was an American poet, novelist, and editor.

== Life ==
She was born in Brooklyn, New York, the daughter of Nicholas Melhem and Georgette Deyrataui Melhem, both immigrants from Lebanon. She graduated from New York University cum laude and received her master's degree and a doctoral degree in English and American Literature from City College. She was a longtime resident of New York City, where her two children were born and raised. Melhem moved to Long Beach, California, in 2012, and lived there until her death on June 15, 2013.

Melhem was a close personal friend of Pulitzer Prize-winning poet Gwendolyn Brooks, about whom she wrote a biography, Gwendolyn Brooks: Poetry and the Heroic Voice.

== Awards ==
- 1991: American Book Award

== Works ==
=== Poetry ===
- New York Poems. Syracuse University Press. 2005. ISBN 978-0-8156-0813-4.
- Conversation with a Stonemason. Ikon. 2003. ISBN 978-0-945368-07-6.
- Poems for You (P&Q Press, 2000)
- Of Country (CCC, 1998)
- Rest in Love. Confrontation Magazine Press. 1995. ISBN 978-0-913057-22-3.

=== Novels ===
- Blight. Riverrun Press. 1995. ISBN 978-0-7145-4274-4.
- Stigma & The Cave. Syracuse University Press. 2007. ISBN 978-0-8156-0882-0.

=== Anthologies ===
- Hayan Charara, ed. (2008). Inclined to Speak. University of Arkansas Press. ISBN 978-1-55728-866-0.
- Tina Chang; Nathalie Handal; Ravi Shankar, eds. (April 17, 2008). Language for a New Century. W.W. Norton. ISBN 978-0-393-33238-4.
- Long Island Island Sounds (NSPS Press)

=== Criticism ===
- Gwendolyn Brooks: Poetry and the Heroic Voice. University Press of Kentucky. 1988. ISBN 978-0-8131-0180-4.
- Heroism in the New Black Poetry: Introductions and Interviews. University Press of Kentucky. 1992. ISBN 978-0-8131-0807-0.
