= Philo Ikonya =

Kenyan writer and journalist, human rights activist

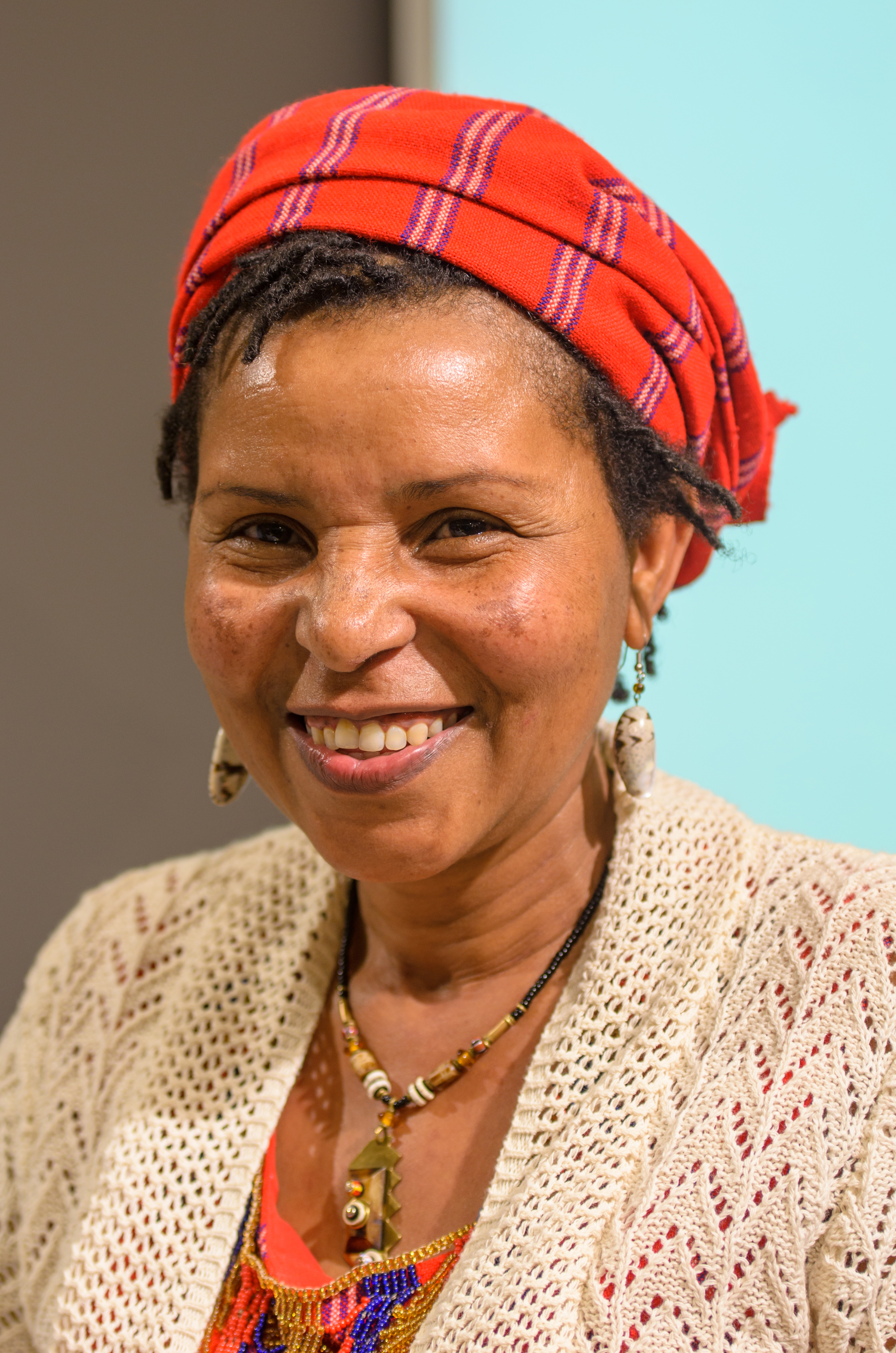
- Born: Kenya
- Education: Master's degree in Literature
- Alma mater: University of Nairobi
- Occupations: Writer; Journalist; Human rights activist
- Employer: Tangaza College (Catholic University of Eastern Africa)
- Writing career
- Notable works: Kenya, Will You Marry Me?
- Movements: Human rights activism, nonviolent protest

Philo Ikonya is a writer, journalist and human rights activist from Kenya. Her articles and books often cover the current political situation in Kenya. She was the president of Kenya's branch of PEN, the international association of writers. After several arrests for her activism and a severe beating in 2009 while in police custody, she left Kenya in political exile.

== Professional life ==
In addition to journal and magazine articles, Ikonya has published books of poetry and a novel, Kenya, Will You Marry Me? She also translated a book of poetry by Chinese poet Jidi Majia into the Kiswahili language.

Ikonya attended the University of Nairobi, where she earned a master's degree in literature. She has taught semiotics at Tangaza College of the Catholic University of Eastern Africa.

== Activism ==
While in Kenya, Ikonya was active in the work of human rights and non-violent activism and was arrested two separate times in 2007. At a 2008 protest against Kenya's then-president Mwai Kibaki, she said, "Every day something is happening that is just showing insensitivity on the part of the leaders so there is general discontent." In 2009, she learned of British journalist Michela Wrong's book It's Our Turn to Eat: The Story of a Kenyan Whistle-Blower, which was available internationally but censored in Kenya. Ikonya and other members of Kenyan PEN acquired copies and brought them back to Kenya for more widespread distribution.

On 18 February 2009, Ikonya and two others were arrested outside the Parliament of Kenya at a protest against hyperinflation. While in police custody, she was severely beaten by a male police officer. Later that year, she left Kenya and went to an International City of Refuge in Oslo, Norway. She continued to be involved with PEN, including with their Writers in Prison Committee.
