= Jessica Dragonette =

American radio singer (1900–1980)

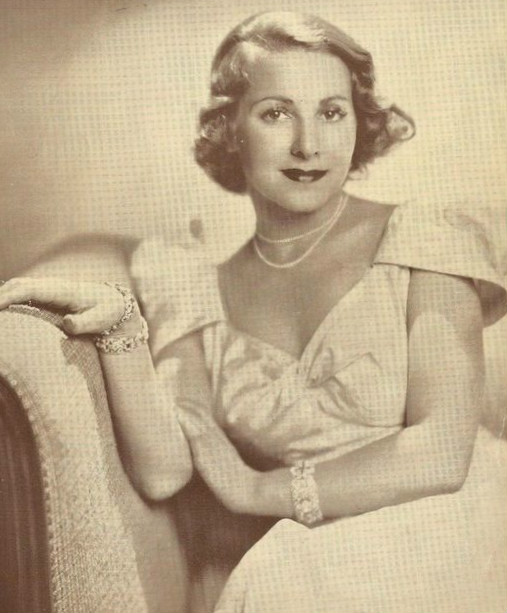
Jessica Dragonette

Jessica Dragonette (born Jessica Valentina Dragonetti; February 14, 1900 – March 18, 1980) was a singer who became popular on American radio and was active in the World War II effort.

== Early life ==
Dragonette was born in Calcutta, India as Jessica Valentina Dragonetti to devoutly Catholic Italian-born parents, Luigi ("Louis") Dragonetti and Maria Vittoria Rachele Beronio. The Social Security Death Index cites Dragonette's year of birth as 1900, as does the 1900 United States census (June 1900) which gives the age of "Jessie Dragonet" as 4 months. Jessica was born in India as her father was an engineer and work assignments often took the young family to other countries. She joined elder siblings Nicholas, Fred, and Nadea to complete the family. By Christmas 1909, however, she was orphaned and raised in a Catholic convent school. She graduated from Catholic Girls' High School in Philadelphia in 1919. Dragonette was a 1923 graduate of Mt. St. Mary's College. New York poet Ree Dragonette was her cousin.

Dragonette's musical debut was at the Academy of Music in Philadelphia. During her college years, she studied with singing coach Estelle Liebling in New York City. Liebling steered her away from a career as a concert performer toward work on radio.

== Career ==
In 1924, Dragonette provided an angel's off-screen voice in Max Reinhardt's production of The Miracle, and in the summer of 1924, she was a member of Andra Sherri's Revue, which was part of a midsummer festival at the Lyric Theater in Indianapolis, Indiana. She began singing on radio as early as December 4, 1924, when she performed on WGBS in New York City. In 1925, Dragonette became a member of the cast of the third edition of The Earl Carroll Vanities. Another Broadway production in which Dragonette appeared was Grand Street Follies (1926). She and contralto Celia Branz were known as the Junior Prima Donnas in that production. Also in 1925, that duo sang on WLIT radio in Philadelphia and headlined the stage show that accompanied a film at the Stanley Theater, also in Philadelphia. Dragonette continued performing on radio as a member of the cast of Roxy and His Gang when the program resumed weekly broadcasts on October 30, 1925, over WEAF in New York City and WEEI in Boston. In 1926, she began performing on WEAF in the Musical Comedy Hour, and in 1927 she started singing in operettas there as "Vivian, 'The Coca-Cola Girl'" on The Coca-Cola Hour, which debuted in 1927 as Coca-Cola's first venture into radio advertising.

During her 22-year radio career she helped to popularize operettas and semi-classical music. An admiring press dubbed her the "Princess of Song", a nickname she later would use to publicize concert events. She was the star of The Philco Hour on NBC in 1927-28. She became the star of the Cities Service Concerts program, which she joined in 1930. In September 1935, a national poll conducted by Radio Guide magazine named Dragonette the most popular radio performer of the year. Radio Guide also awarded her its highest honor, the Radio Guide Medal of Merit, in 1936. The article about the award noted that to Dragonette a "microphone represents the millions who have heard her and who have become her friends. It is to that audience, not those who sit before her in a studio, that she pays the homage of her song." Dragonette's popularity on radio translated into crowds at personal appearances, including 15,000 in an auditorium in Minneapolis while snow fell and 150,000 in Chicago's Grant Park.

When the Palmolive Beauty Box Theater moved from NBC radio to CBS in 1936, Dragonette became the host of the show and performed in some episodes. Dragonette sang in a segment of the film The Big Broadcast of 1936, on the condition that she have authority over the final cut on her performance. In the end she chose to have her part removed. In 1934, she provided the voice of Persephone in the Silly Symphony cartoon The Goddess of Spring. And in 1939, she provided the voice of Princess Glory in the full color animated motion picture Gulliver's Travels.

In 1940, Swiss-American artist Adolfo Müller-Ury painted a portrait of her that now hangs at her alma mater, now known as Georgian Court University. Müller-Ury became a close friend of the singer and painted her portrait several times—the last of the portraits, painted in 1946, depicts her wearing a gold fez. He also painted a portrait of the singer's sister, Nadea, in 1942. Dragonette joined the cast of Saturday Night Serenade on CBS radio in 1941. During World War II, she performed for charities benefiting the U.S. armed services, earning her an honorary commission as a colonel. She performed frequently for the troops and sold a record number of war bonds. She once remarked that "The Star-Spangled Banner" never had more meaning for her than it did during the war. In addition to English, Jessica impeccably sang in German, French, Spanish, Italian and Russian. She was so good, she once fooled a diplomat into thinking Russian was her native tongue. Never one to use printed music, it’s estimated she memorized over 75 operas and more than 500 songs.

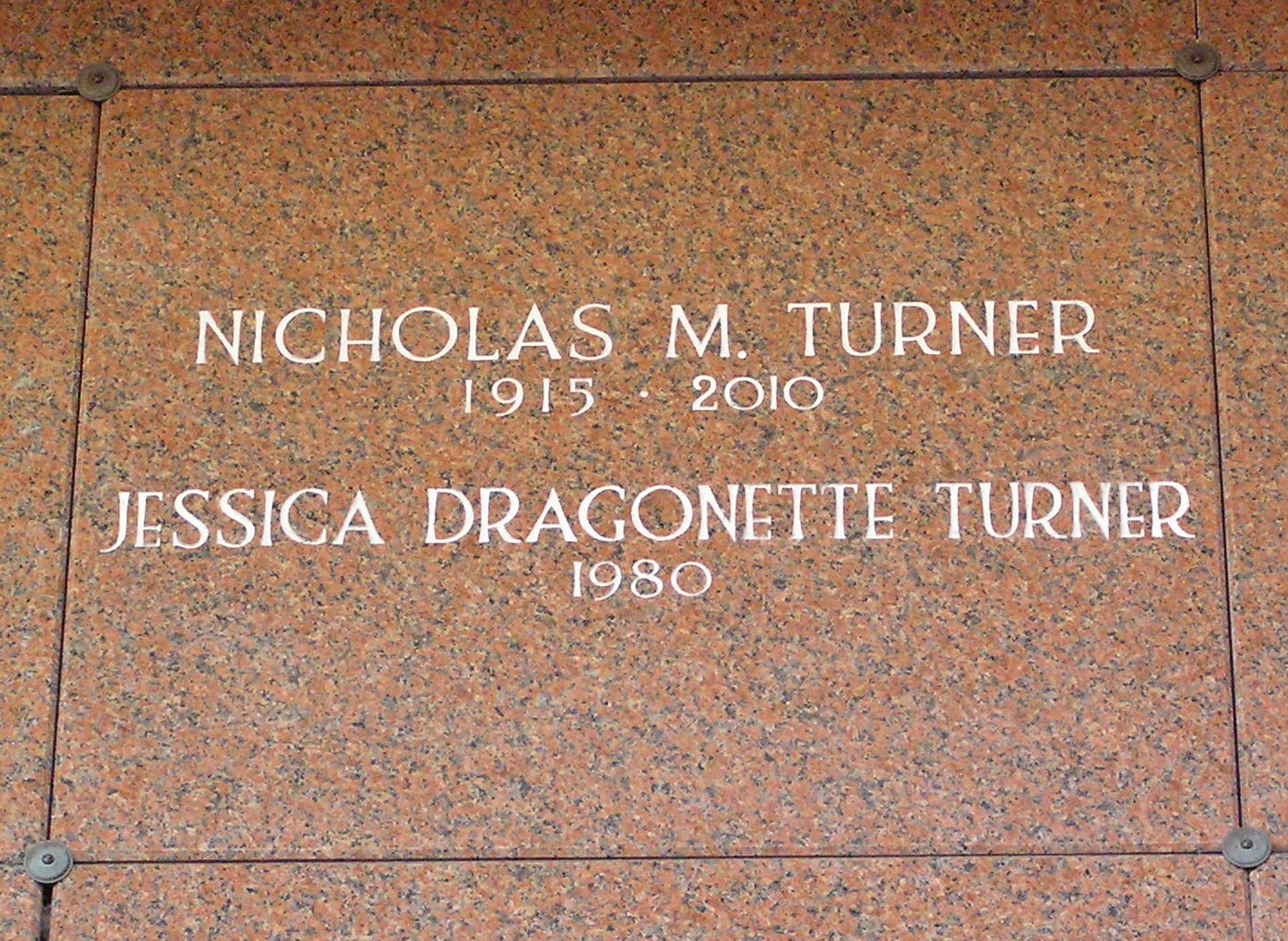
The crypt of Jessica Dragonette Turner. Note that her year of birth is missing on the inscription.

In the mid-1950s, David Gottlieb, the president of leading pinball game manufacturer Gottlieb, hired Dragonette to appear at coin-operated game machine events promoting a pinball game called Dragonette. However, the game had nothing to do with her. It was spoof of a leading TV show of the period, Dragnet.

== Marriage ==
On June 28, 1947, she married Nicholas Meredith Turner at St. Patrick's Cathedral, New York; both were devout Roman Catholics. The ceremony was performed by Cardinal Francis Spellman. The union, Dragonette's only marriage, was childless but happy, and lasted until her death.

== Death ==
Dragonette died in New York Hospital on March 18, 1980, from a heart attack.

== Filmography ==
| Year | Title | Role | Notes |
|---|---|---|---|
| 1934 | The Goddess of Spring | Persephone | voice, animated short |
| 1935 | The Big Broadcast of 1936 | Jessica Dragonette | Uncredited |
| 1939 | Gulliver's Travels | Princess Glory | singing voice, (final film role) |

== Book ==
Dragonette's autobiography, Faith Is a Song, was published in 1951 by David McKay Company. She was assisted by another McKay author, ghostwriter Arthur J. Burks.

== Honors ==
- Pro Pontifice et Ecclesia Cross, Pope Pius XII
- Voted best female singer of the country 1942 and 1943

== Mural ==
The Cooper Hewitt, Smithsonian Design Museum holds "The World of Radio, 1934", a mural that features Dragonette "at the center of the 'story of radio's progress'". More than eight feet high and 16 feet wide, the mural shows Dragonette on top of a globe in a cityscape, surrounded by images that represent people and accomplishments related to the advancement of radio. Commissioned by Dragonette's sister, Nadea Dragonette Loftus, and completed in 1934 by Arthur Gordon Smith, the mural was displayed in the singer's apartment.
