= Cimitero Evangelico agli Allori =

Cemetery in Florence, Italy

Coordinates: 43°44′50.35″N 11°13′48.92″E

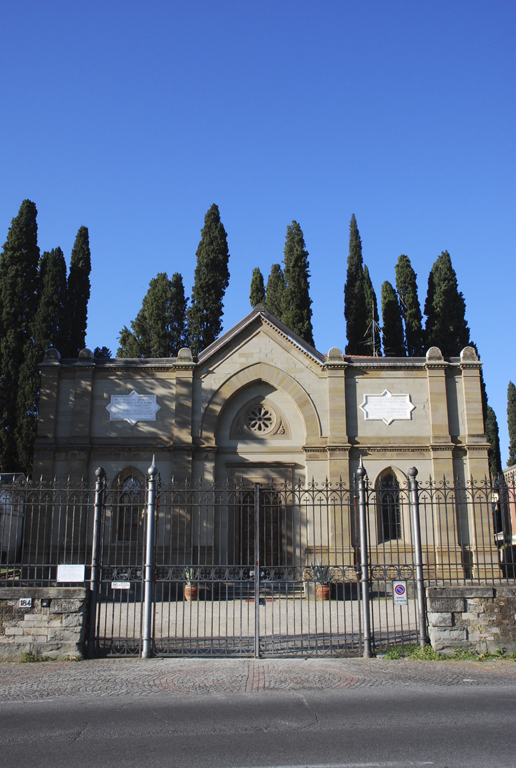
Cimitero Evangelico Agli Allori

The Cimitero Evangelico agli Allori ('Evangelical Cemetery at Laurels') is located in Florence, Italy, between Due Strade and Galluzzo.

== History ==
The small cemetery was opened in 1877 when the non-Catholic communities of Florence could no longer bury their dead in the English Cemetery in Piazzale Donatello. It is named after the Allori farm where it was located.

Born as a Protestant cemetery, it is now nonsectarian and hosts people of all Christian denominations, as well as other religions (including Jews and Muslims) and non-believers.

The cemetery became newsworthy in 2006 when the writer and journalist Oriana Fallaci was buried there alongside her family. A stone memorial to Alexandros Panagoulis, her companion, is also present.

== Notable burials ==
- Harold Acton – British writer, Lot: LOG-I-43
- William Acton – British painter, Lot: LOG-I-43
- Gisela von Arnim Grimm — German fabulist and writer
- Thomas Ball – American sculptor, worked with Hiram Powers and William Couper
- Arnold Böcklin – Swiss painter, Lot: A-VII-2
- Elizabeth Boott – American painter, Frank Duveneck's wife, Lot: R-III-27
- Lewis Einstein - American diplomat, writer and art collector
- Oriana Fallaci – Italian writer, Lot: I-XV-10
- Corrado Feroci (Silpa Bhirasri) – Italian sculptor, Lot: C-II-9
- Larkin Goldsmith Mead – American sculptor, Lot: H-VI-11
- Carmen Gronau - German-british Art and art dealer
- Georg Gronau - German art historian
- John Louis Herbert Hinkler – Australian aviator, Lot: Q-I-23
- Herbert Percy Horne – British art collector, Lot: E-V-25
- Alice Keppel – British mistress of Edward VII and great-grandmother of Queen Camilla.
- George Keppel - British general and great-grandfather of Queen Camilla.
- Emily Hoggins Kossuth – Ferenc Kossuth's wife, Lot: A-VIII-1
- Violet Page (Vernon Lee) – British writer
- Nicolas Lokhoff – Russian artist
- Charles Loeser – Art historian, Lot: A-X-23
- Roberto Longhi – Italian art historian, Lot: N-II-9
- Tjaarke Maas – Dutch artist
- Vasco Magrini – Italian aviator, Lot: A-VIII-13
- Teodorico Pietrocola Rossetti – Italian poet, Lot: A-II-4
- Sir John Pope-Hennessy – British art historian, Lot: T/A-I-13
- Howard Pyle – American illustrator, painter, and author, Columbarium
- Leonardo Savioli – Italian architect, Lot: K-III-21
- Truman Seymour – American Civil War general and watercolor artist
- Osbert Sitwell – British writer
- Hans-Joachim Staude – German painter, Lot: I-XI-27
- Eggert Stefánsson – Icelandic writer and singer
- Frederick Stibbert – Italian British art collector, A-X-25
- Ernesto Michahelles (Thayaht) – Italian artist, Lot: E-V-22
- Violet Trefusis – English and French writer, Lot: I-VIII-44
- Reginald Turner (writer) – British writer and friend of Oscar Wilde
- Mary Rogers Williams – American artist
- Gherardo Nerucci (1828 – 1906) Italian lawyer and historian

== Gallery ==
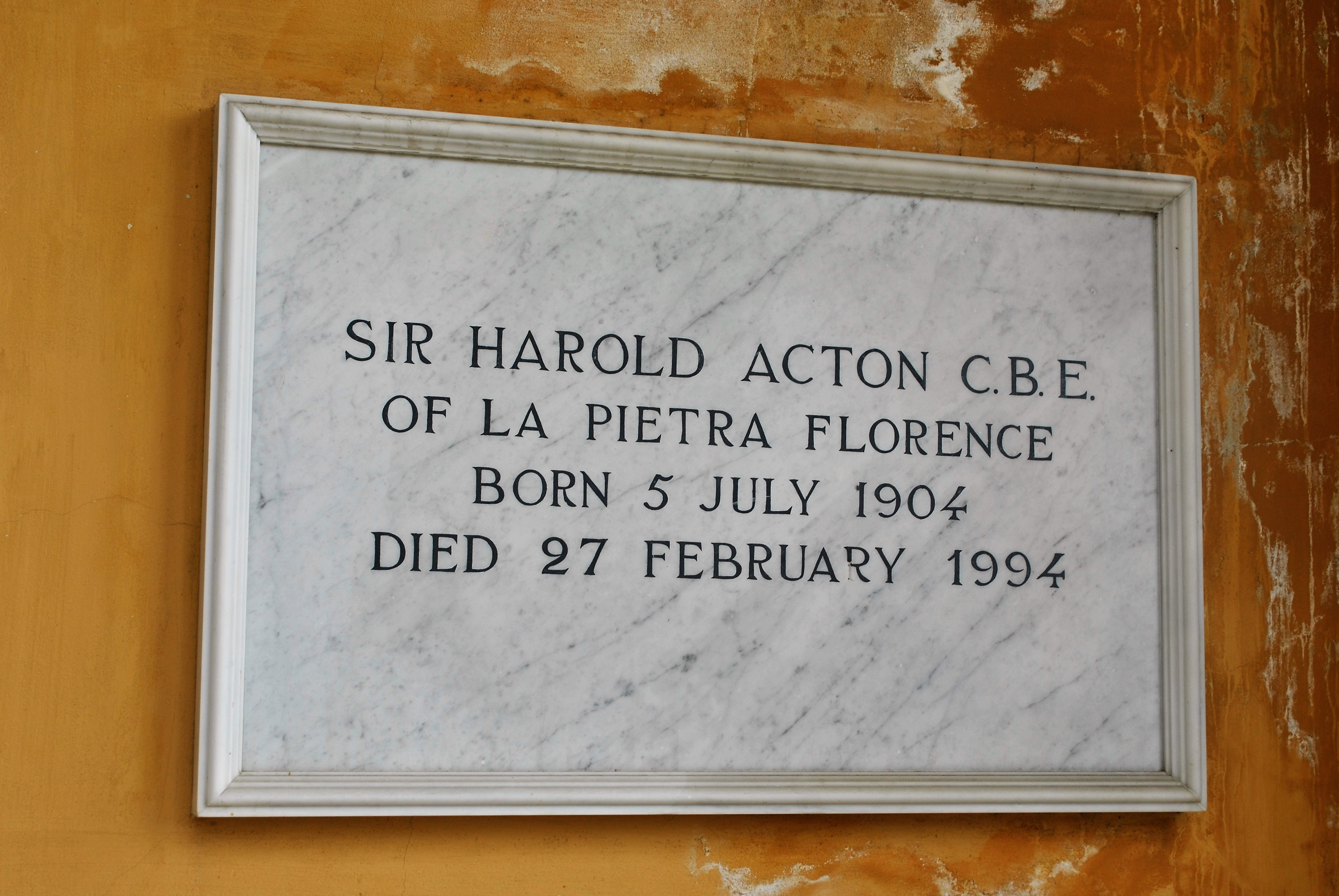
Harold Acton

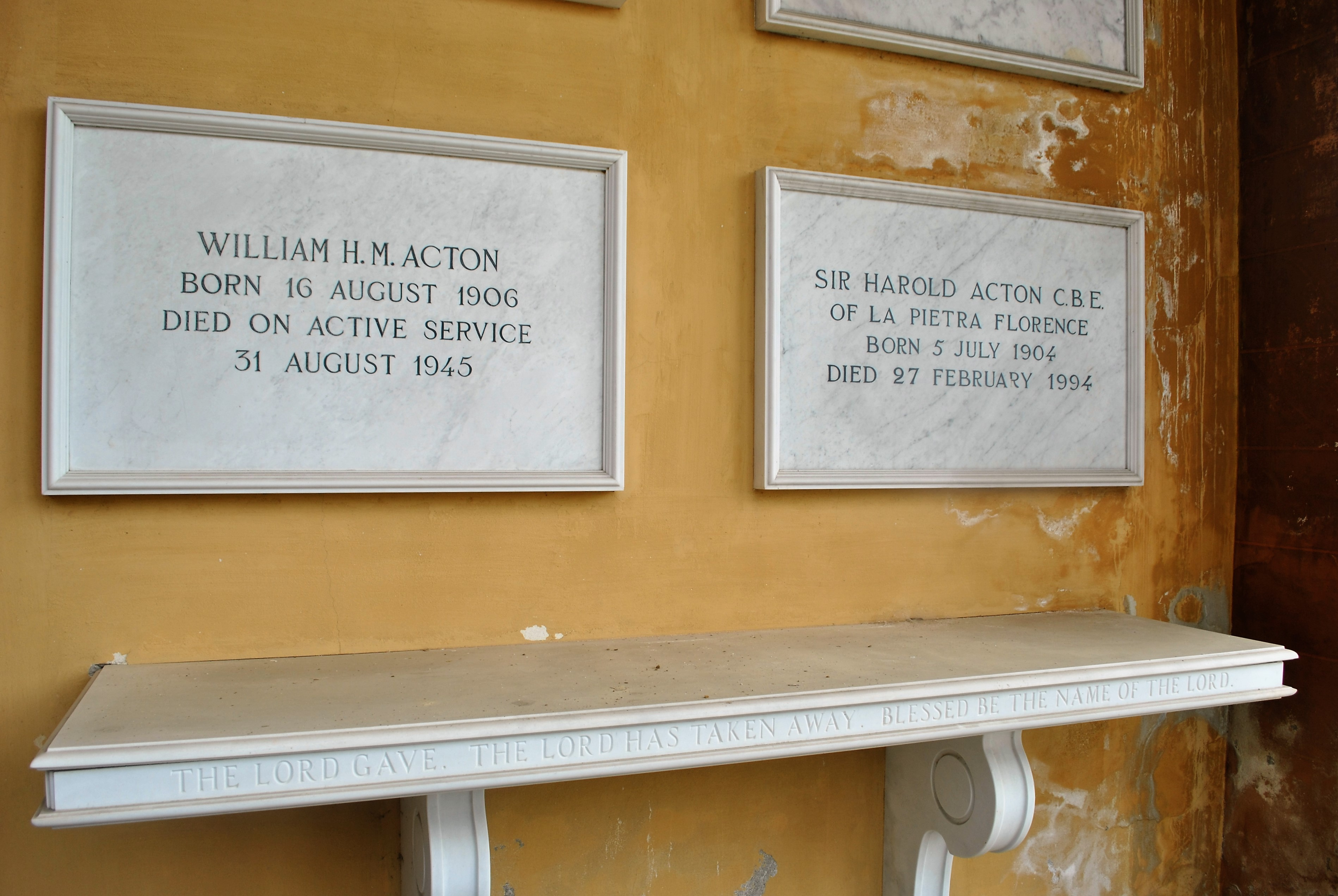
William Acton

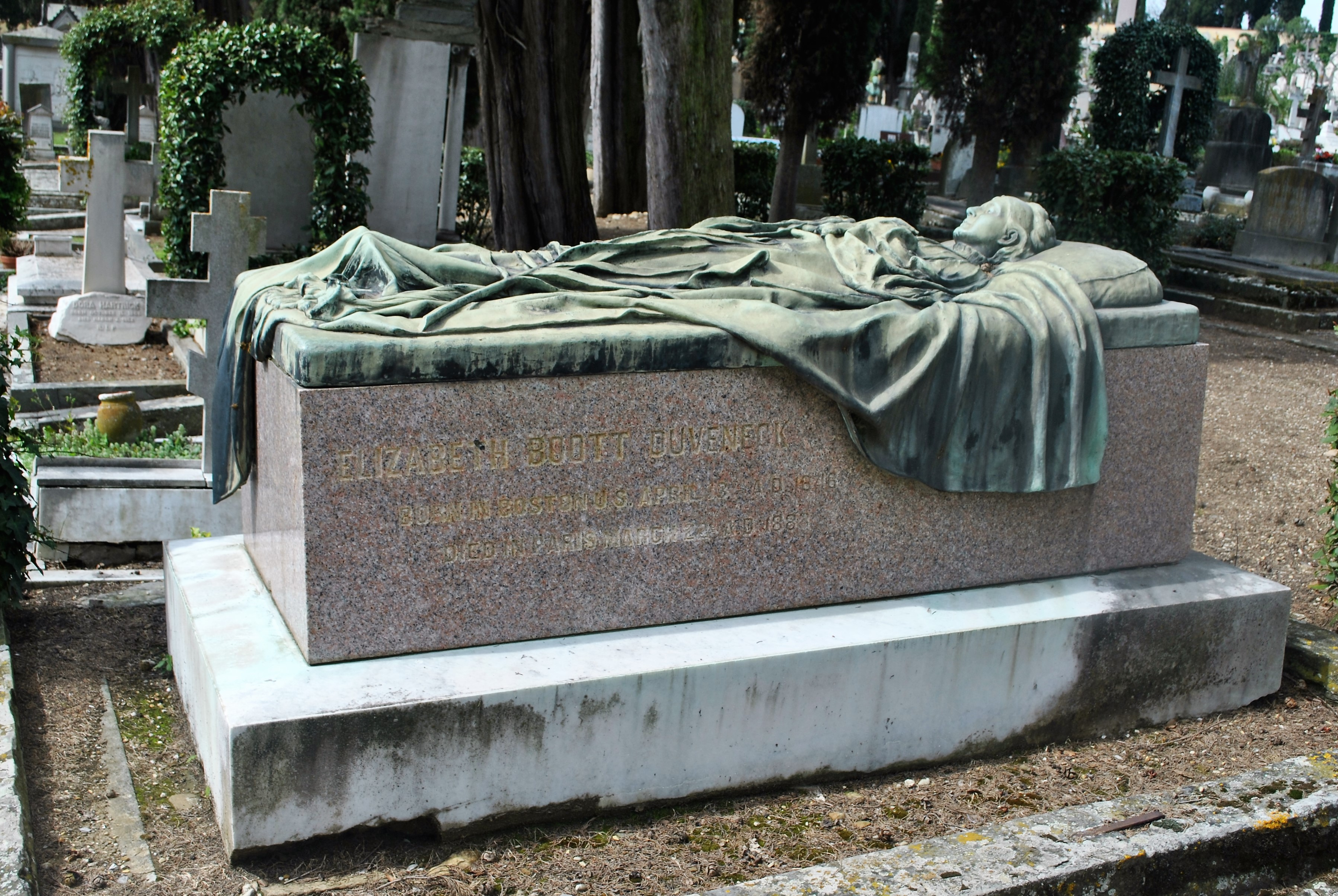
Elizabeth Boott

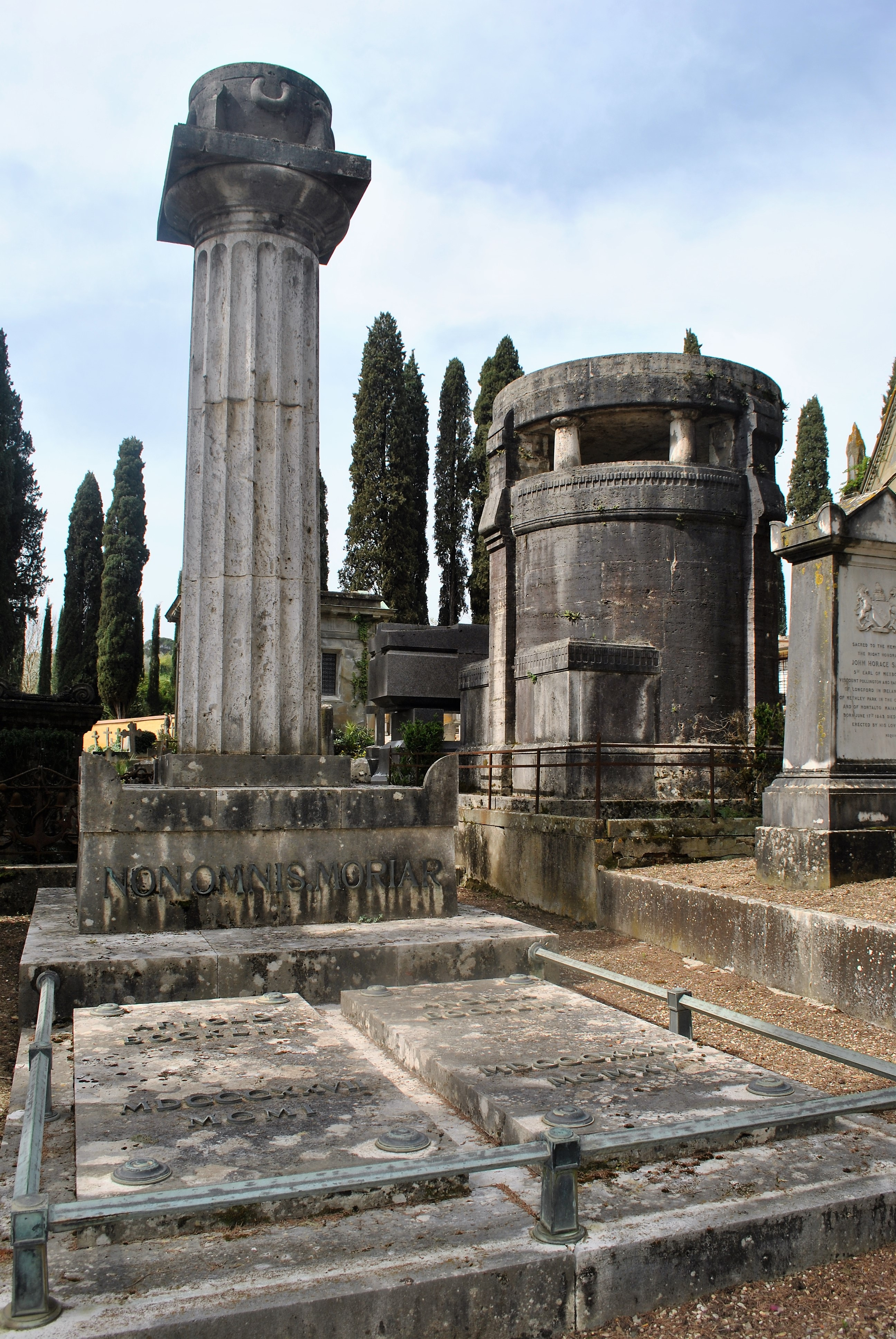
Arnold Bocklin

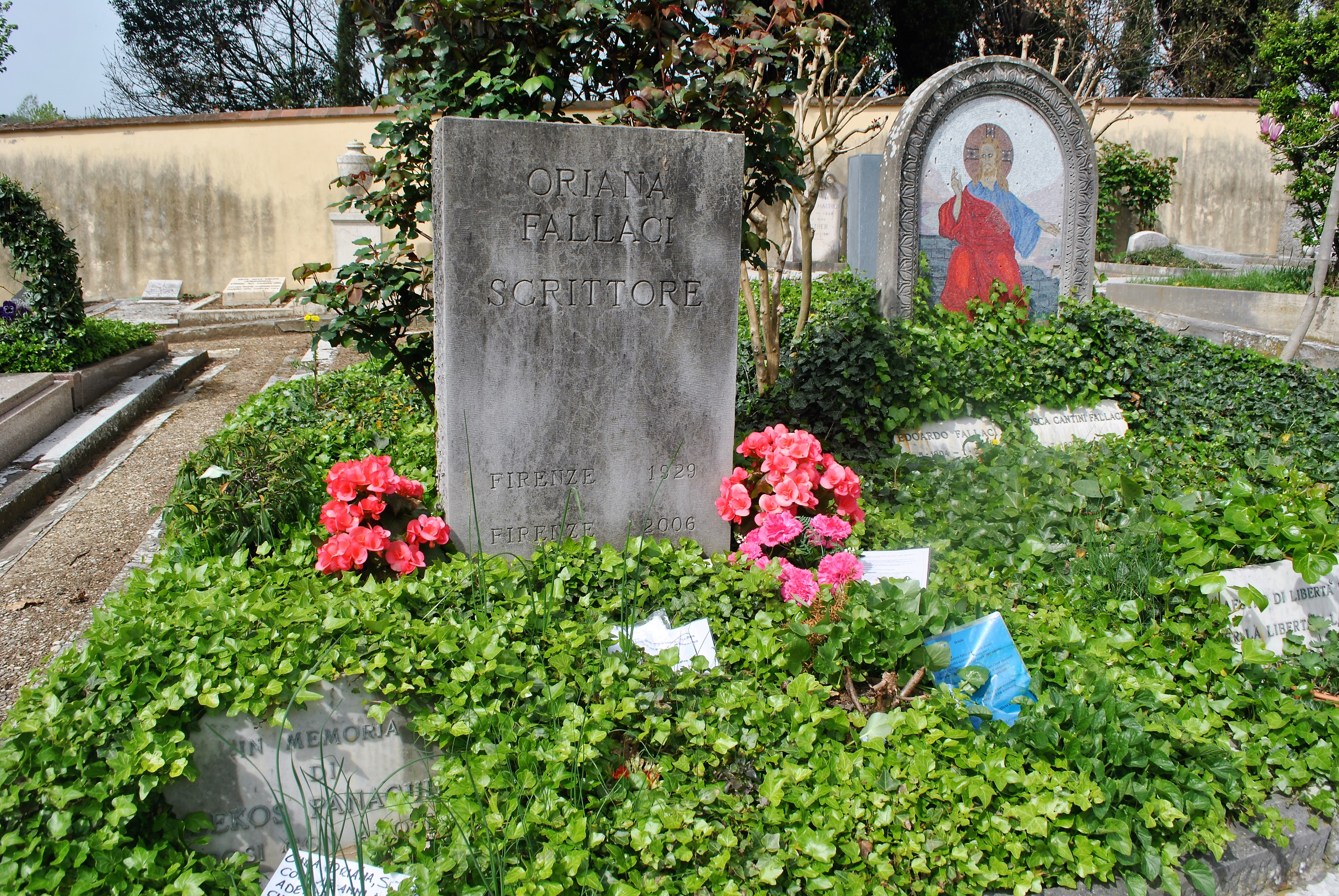
Oriana Fallaci

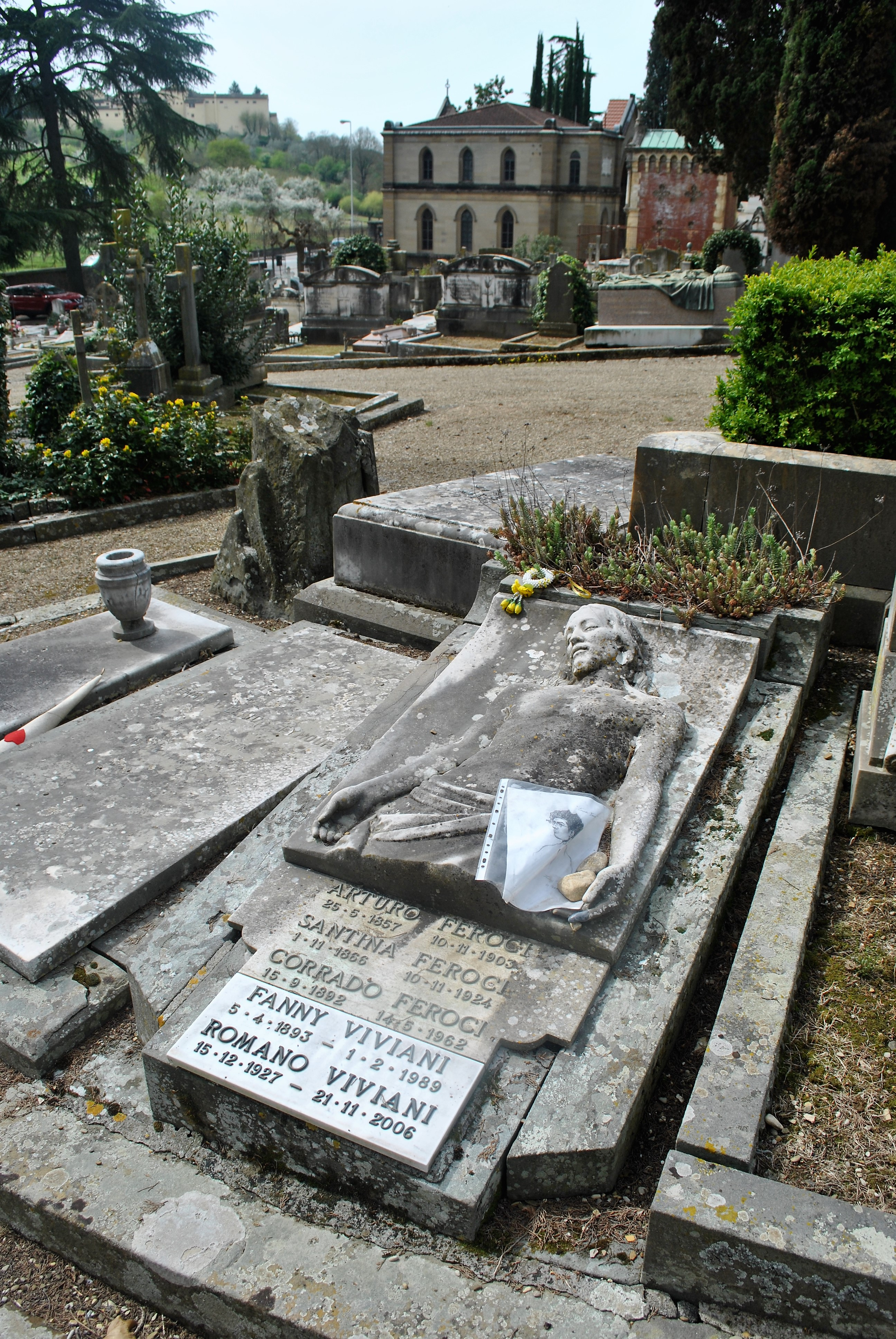
Corrado Feroci

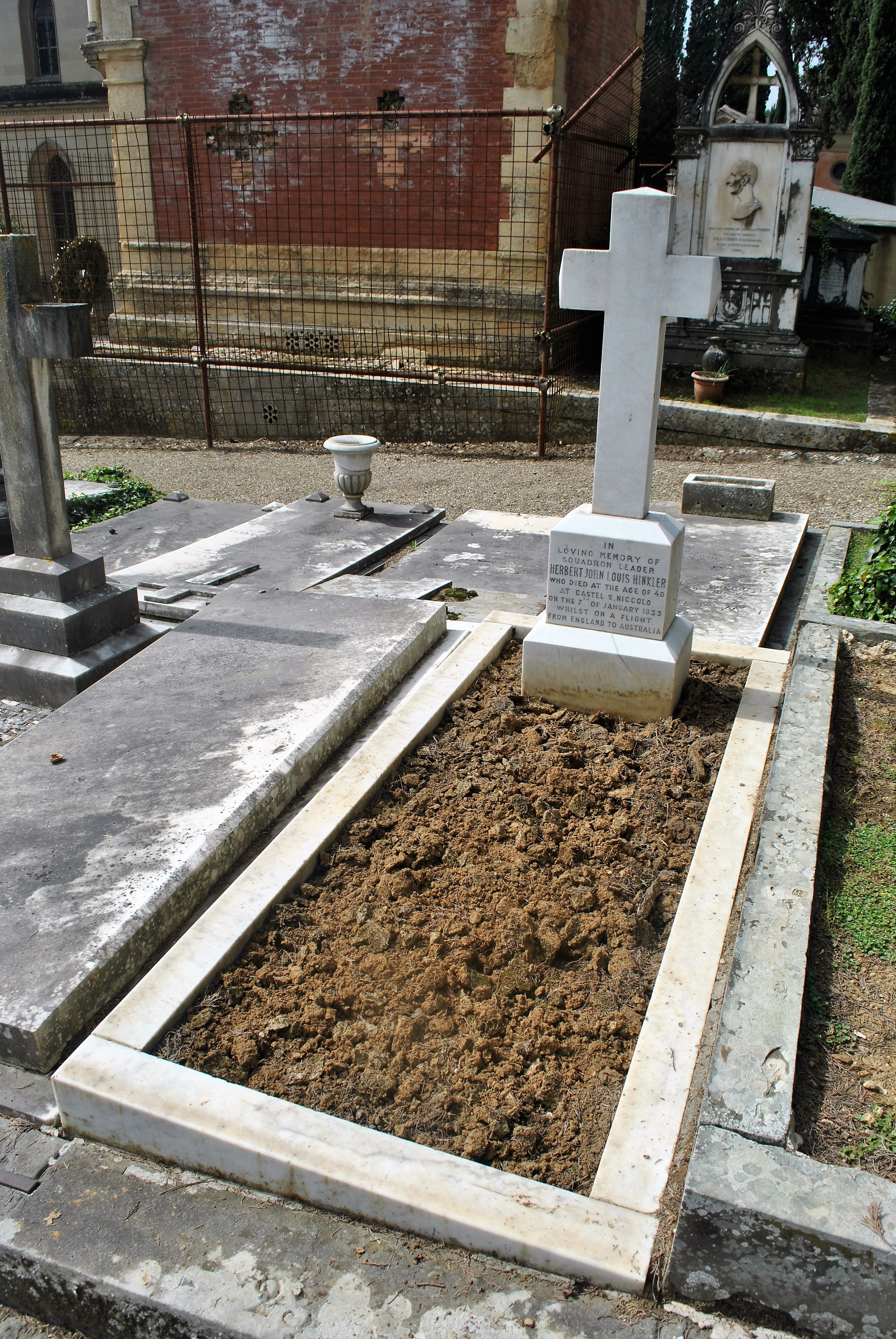
John Louis Herbert Hinkler

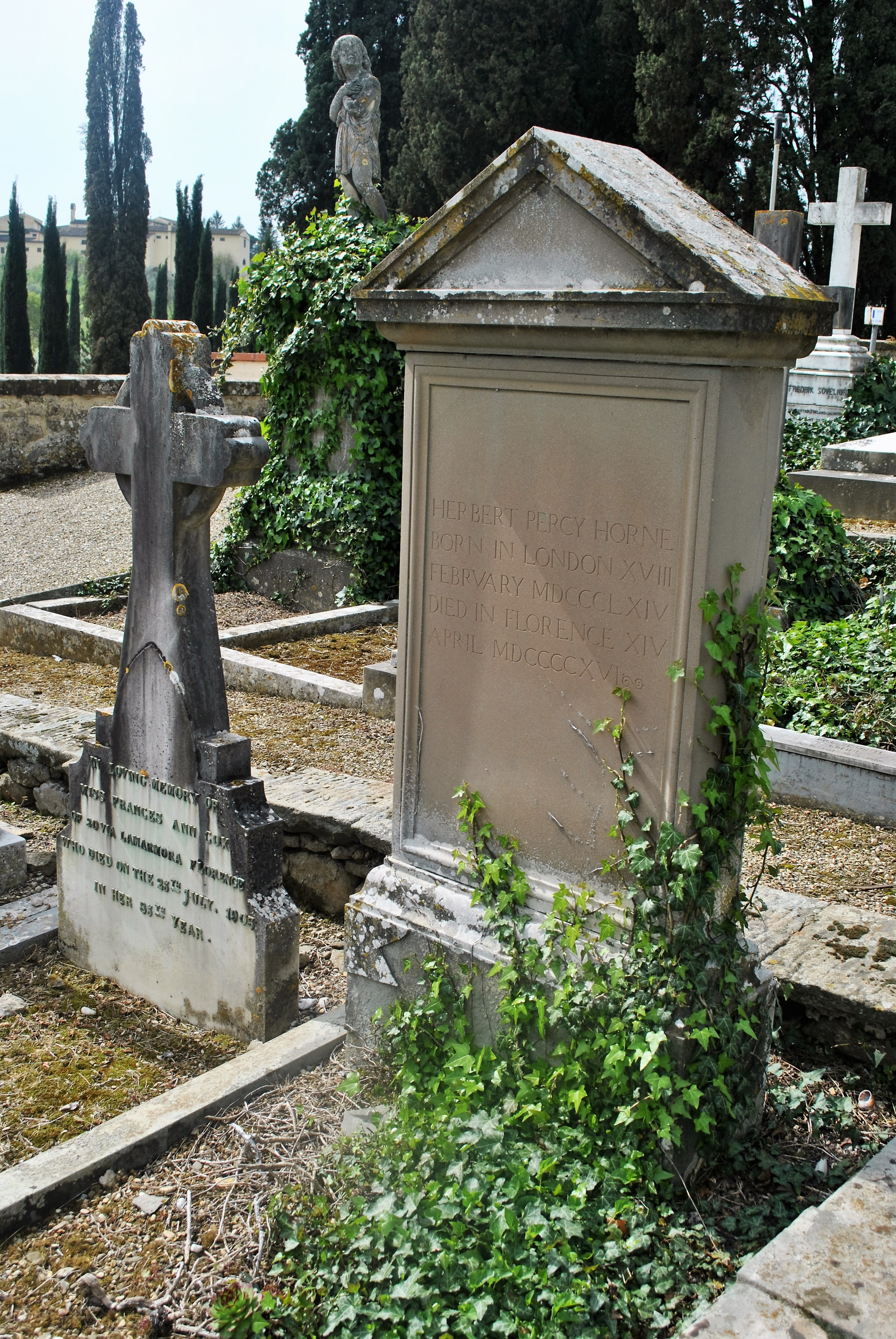
Herbert Percy Horne

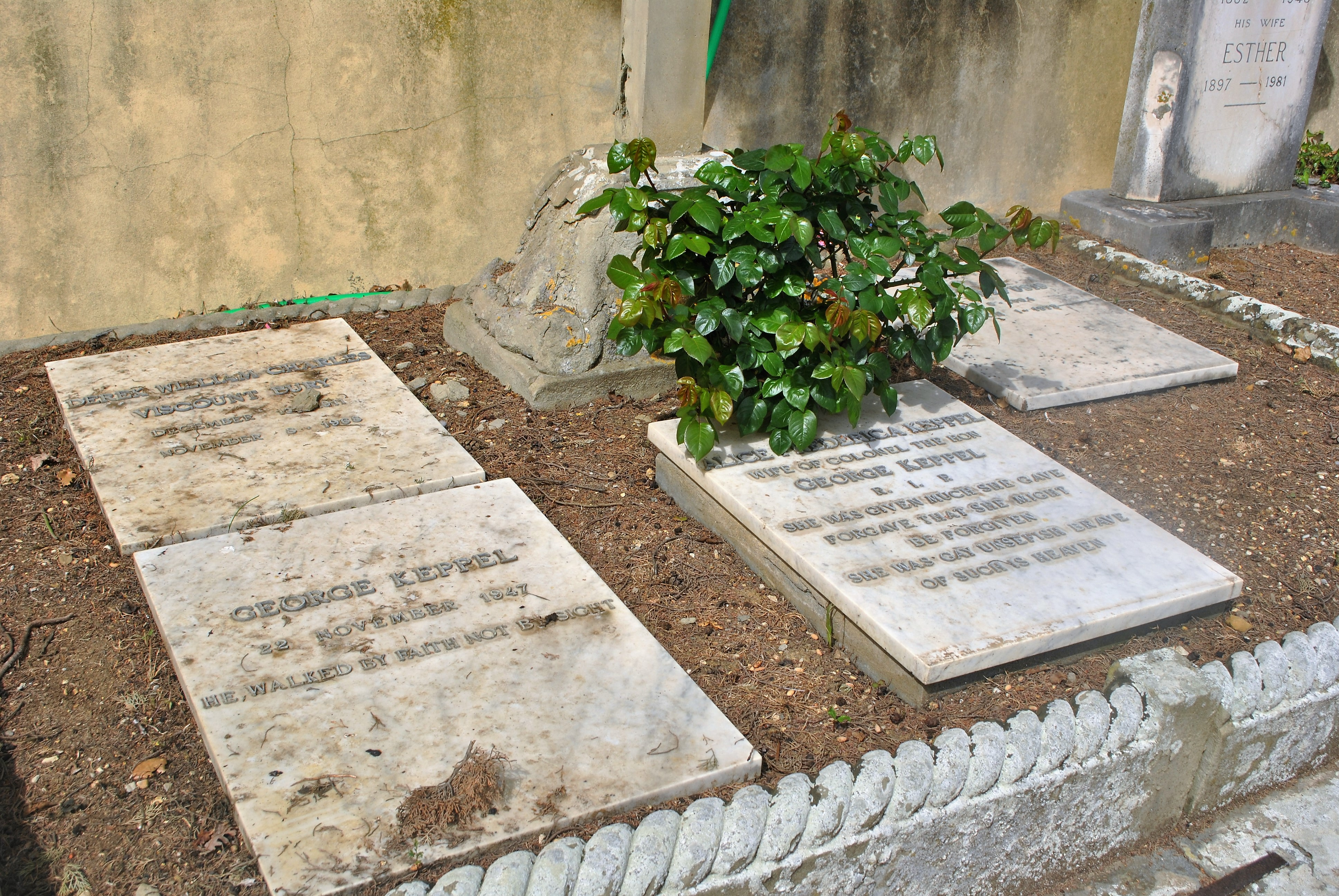
George Keppel and Alice Keppel

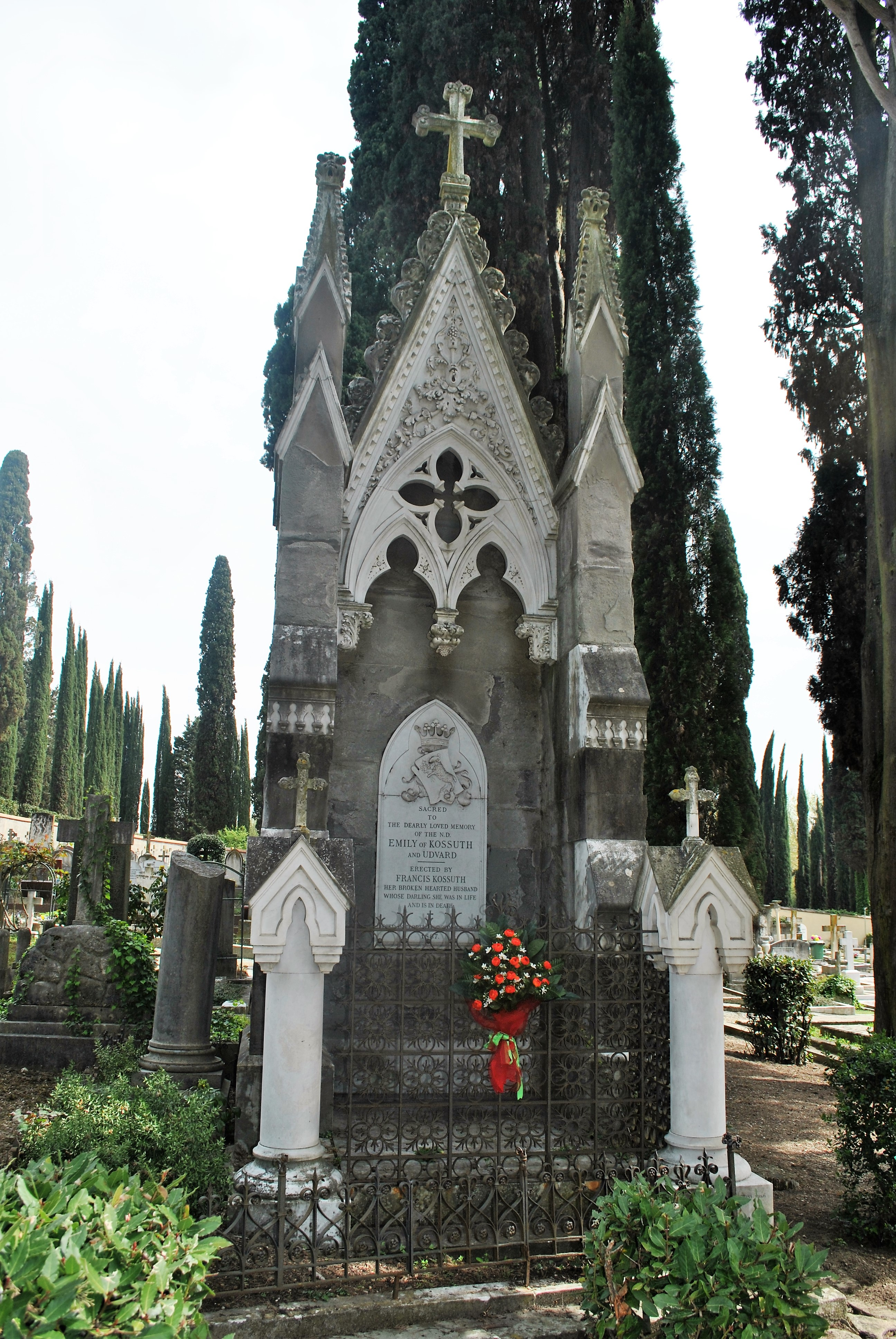
Emily Hoggins Kossuth

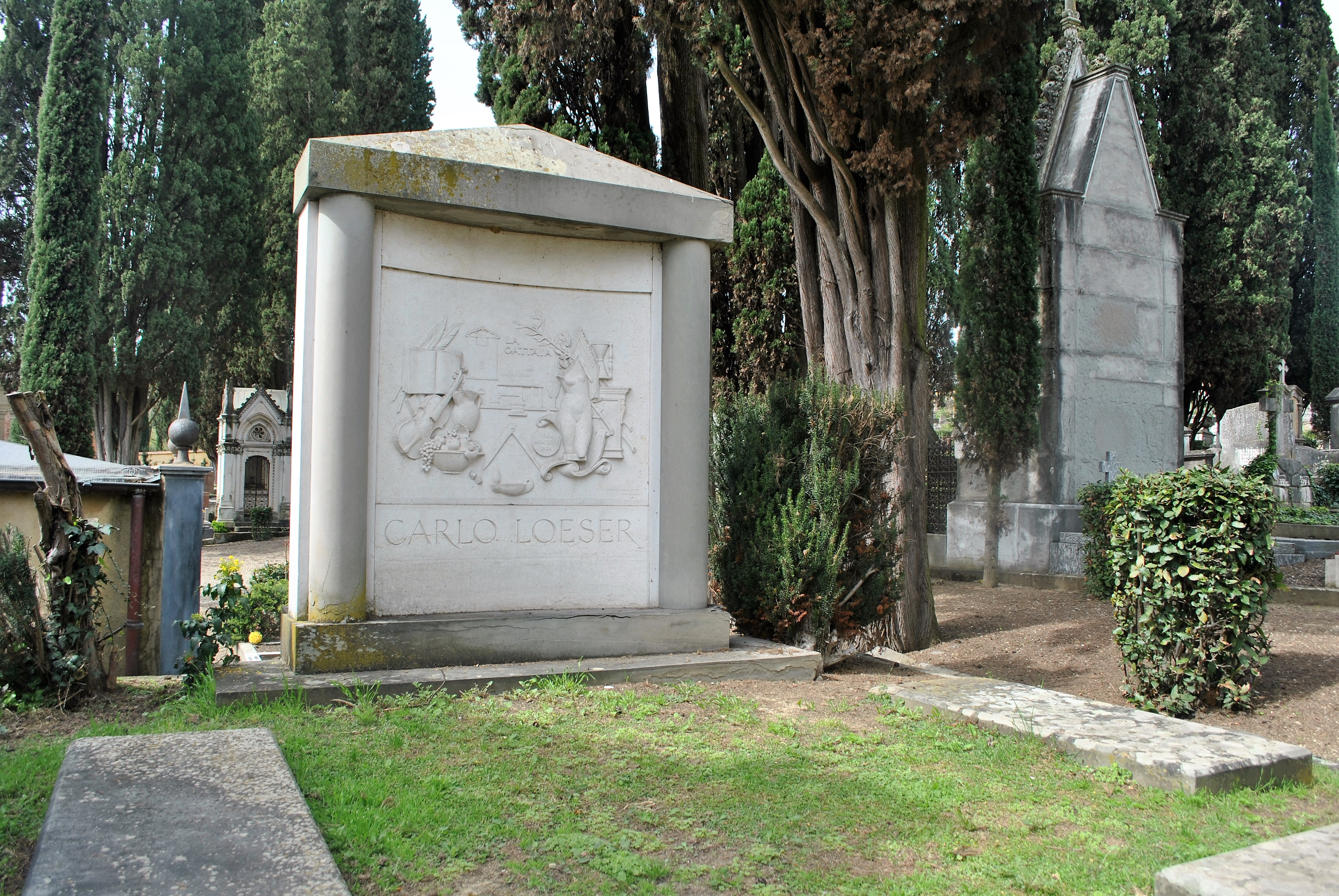
Charles Loeser

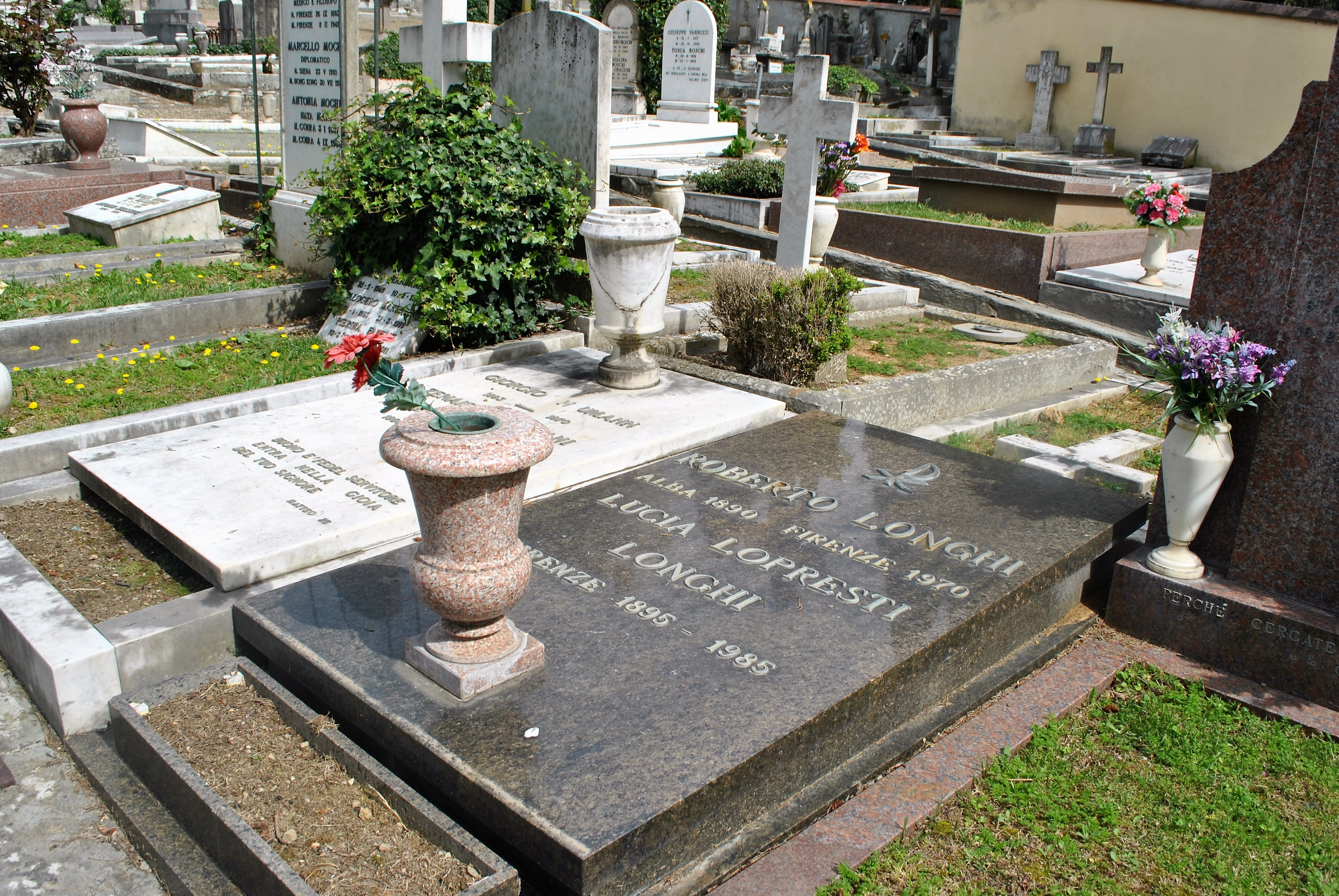
Roberto Longhi

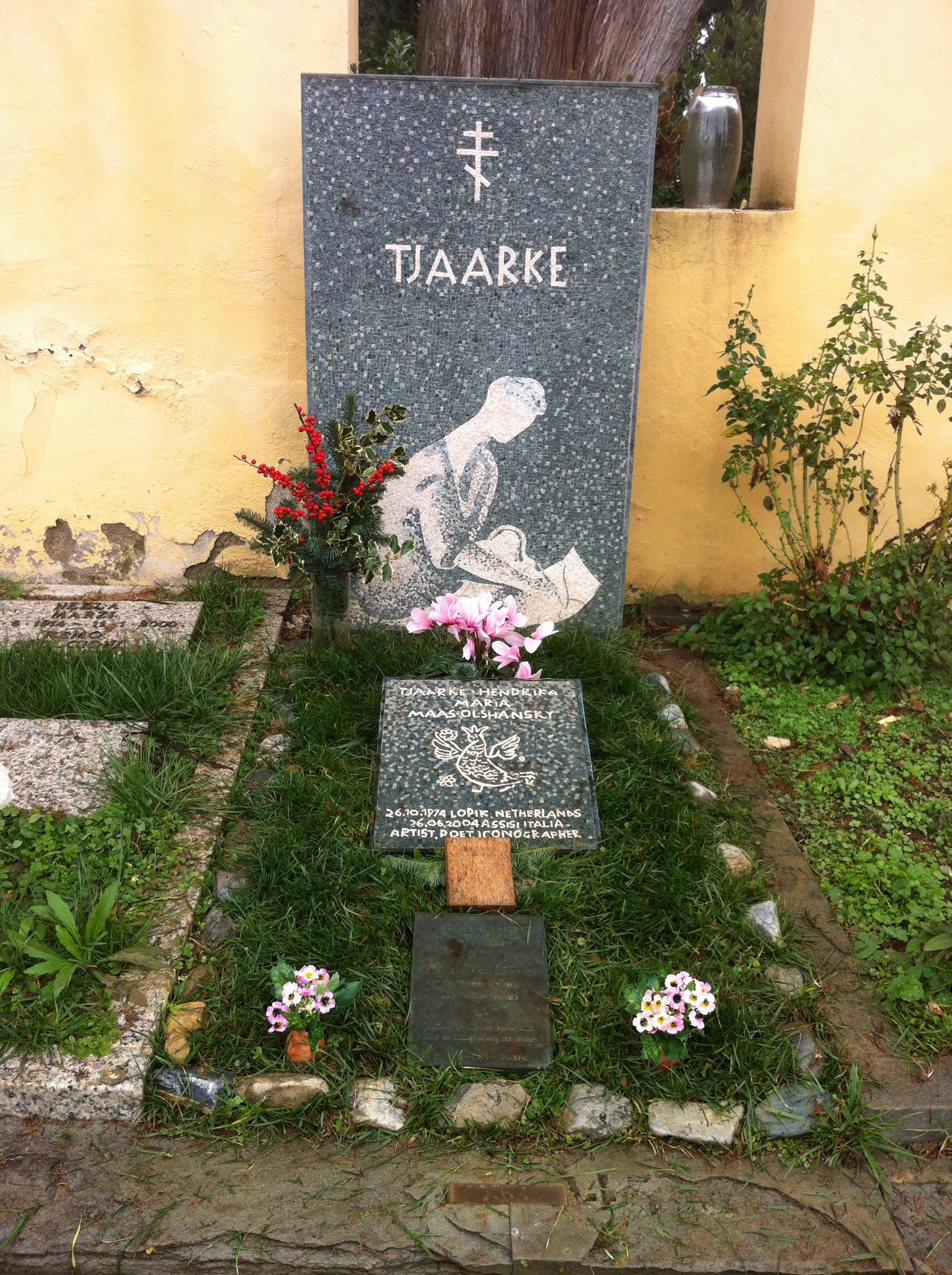
Tjaarke Maas

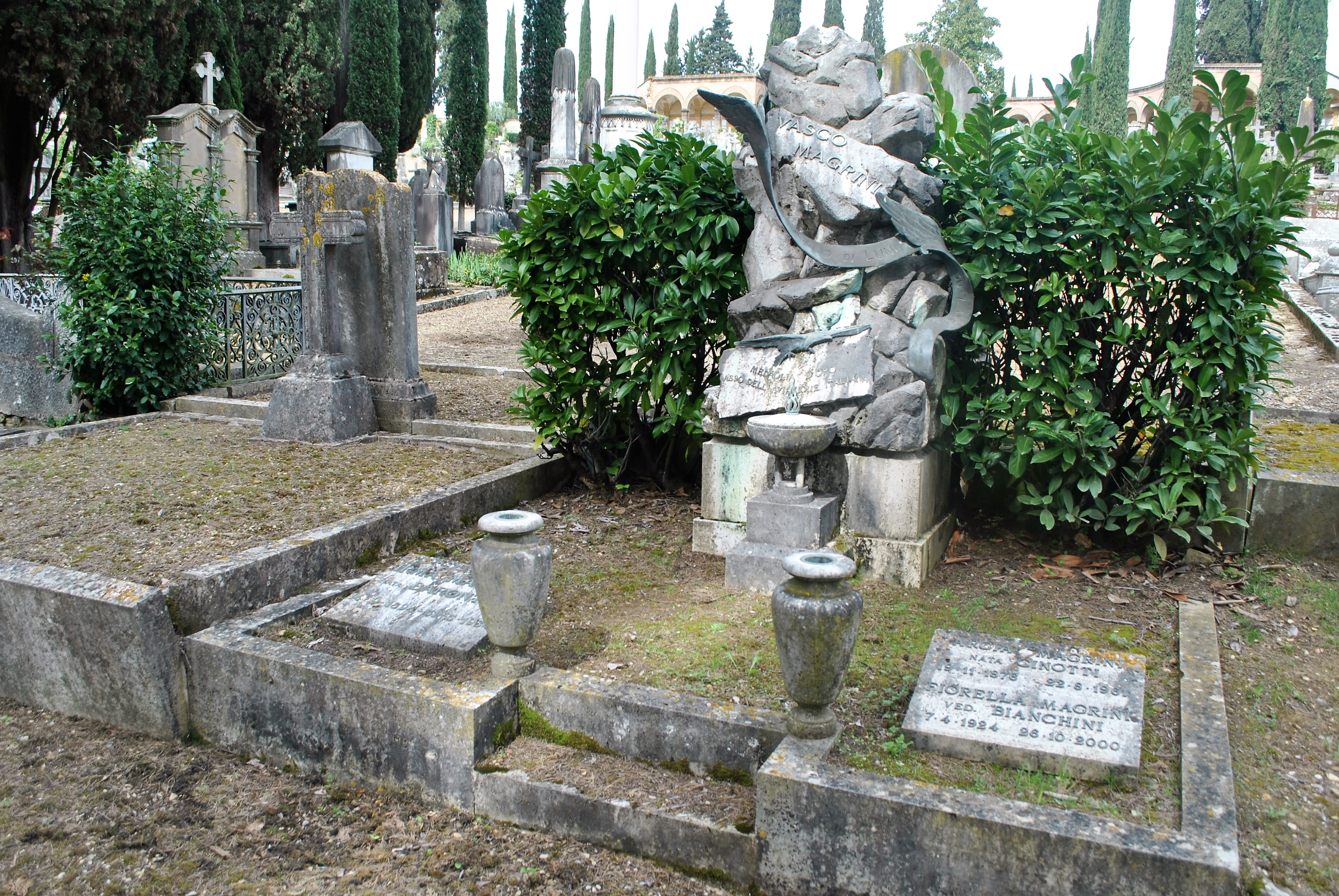
Vasco Magrini

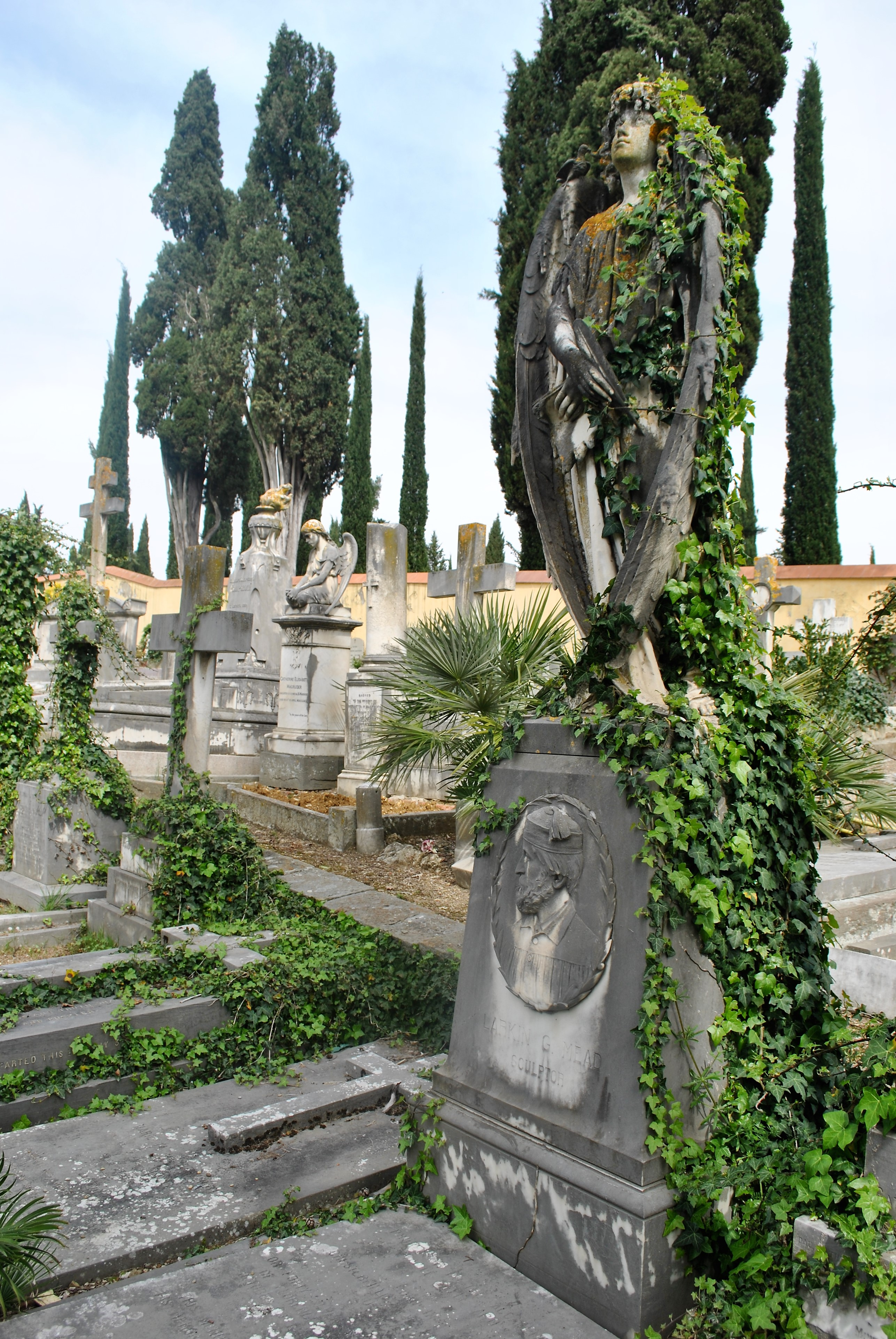
Larkin Goldsmith Mead

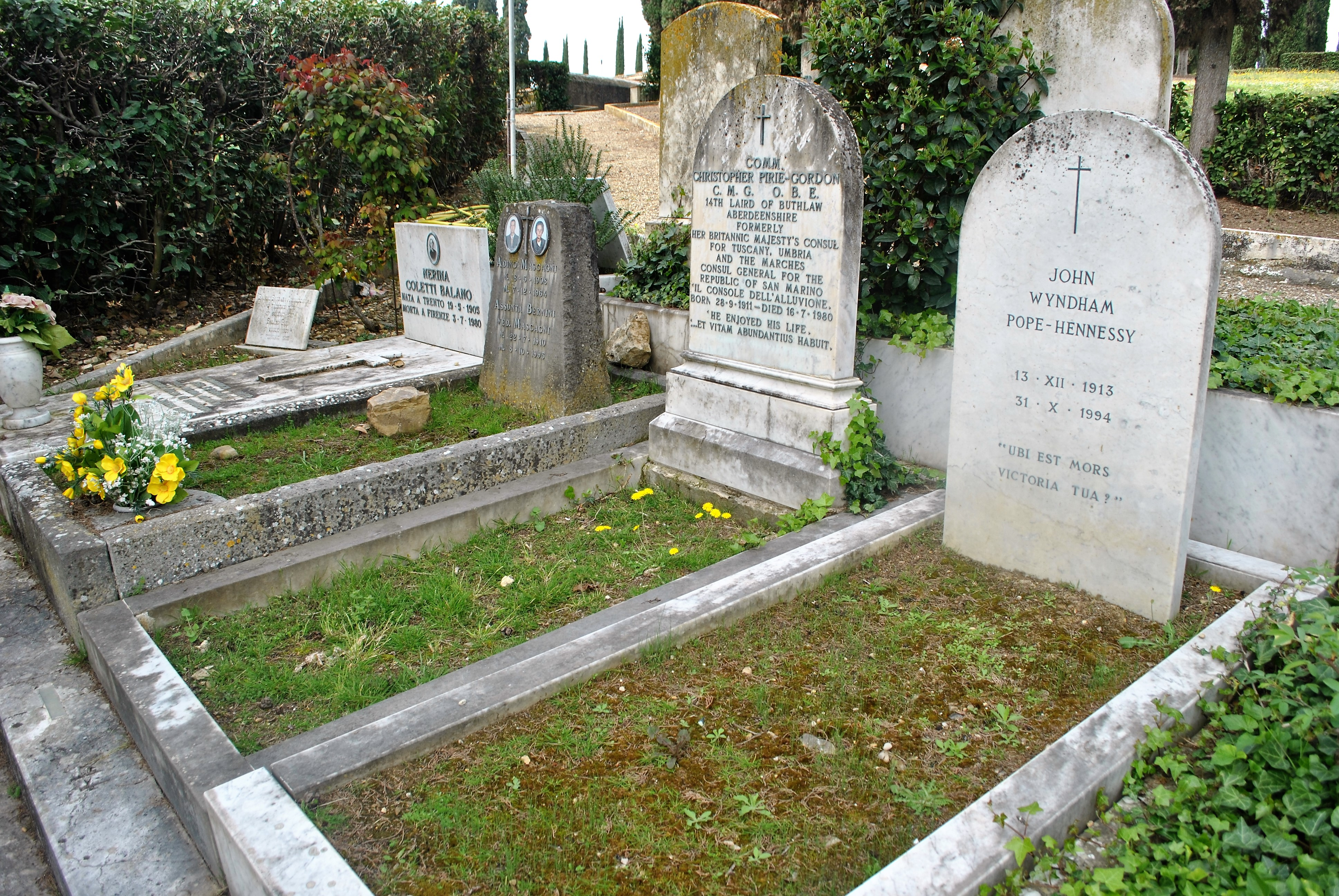
John Pope-Hennessy

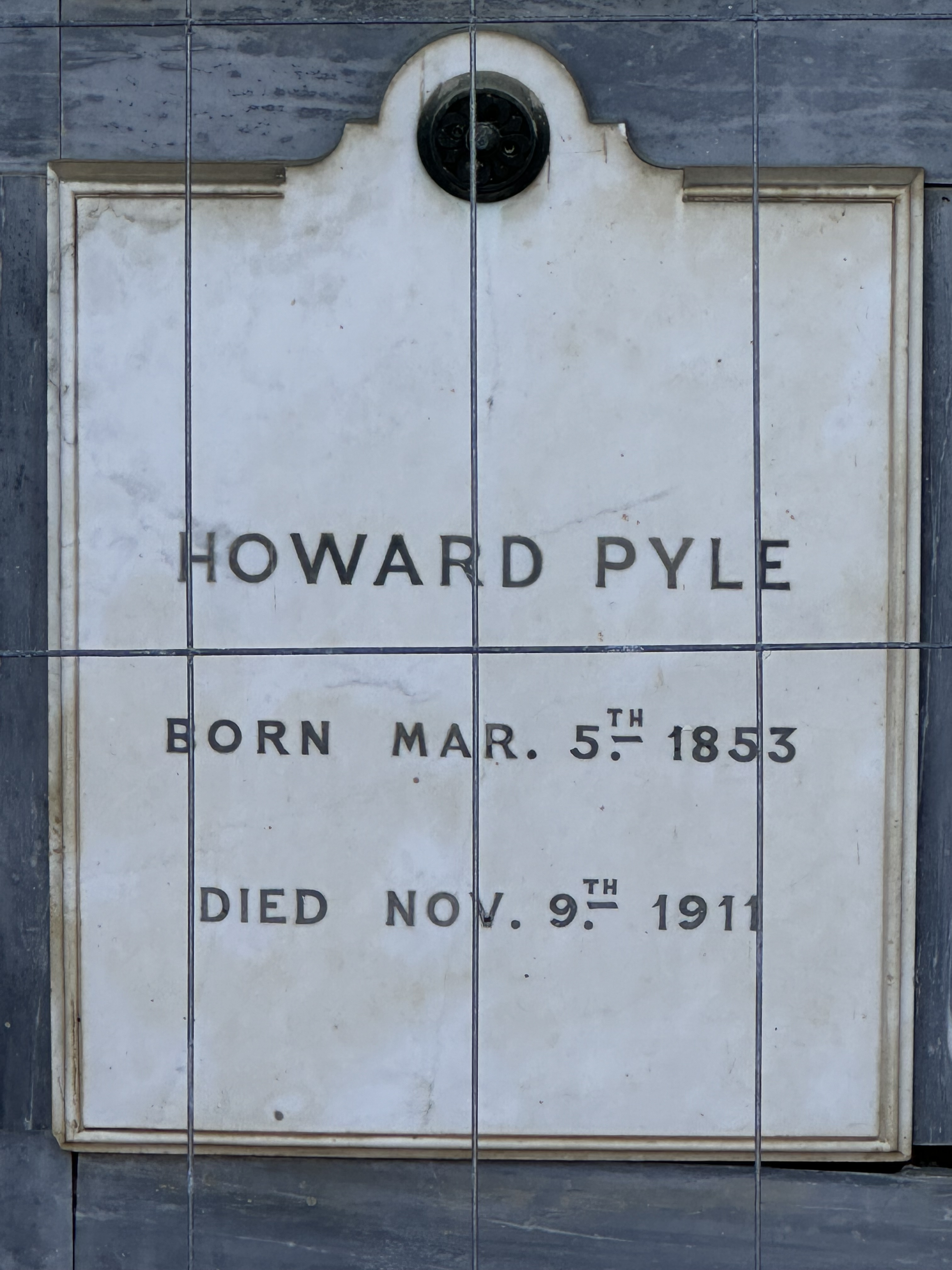
Howard Pyle

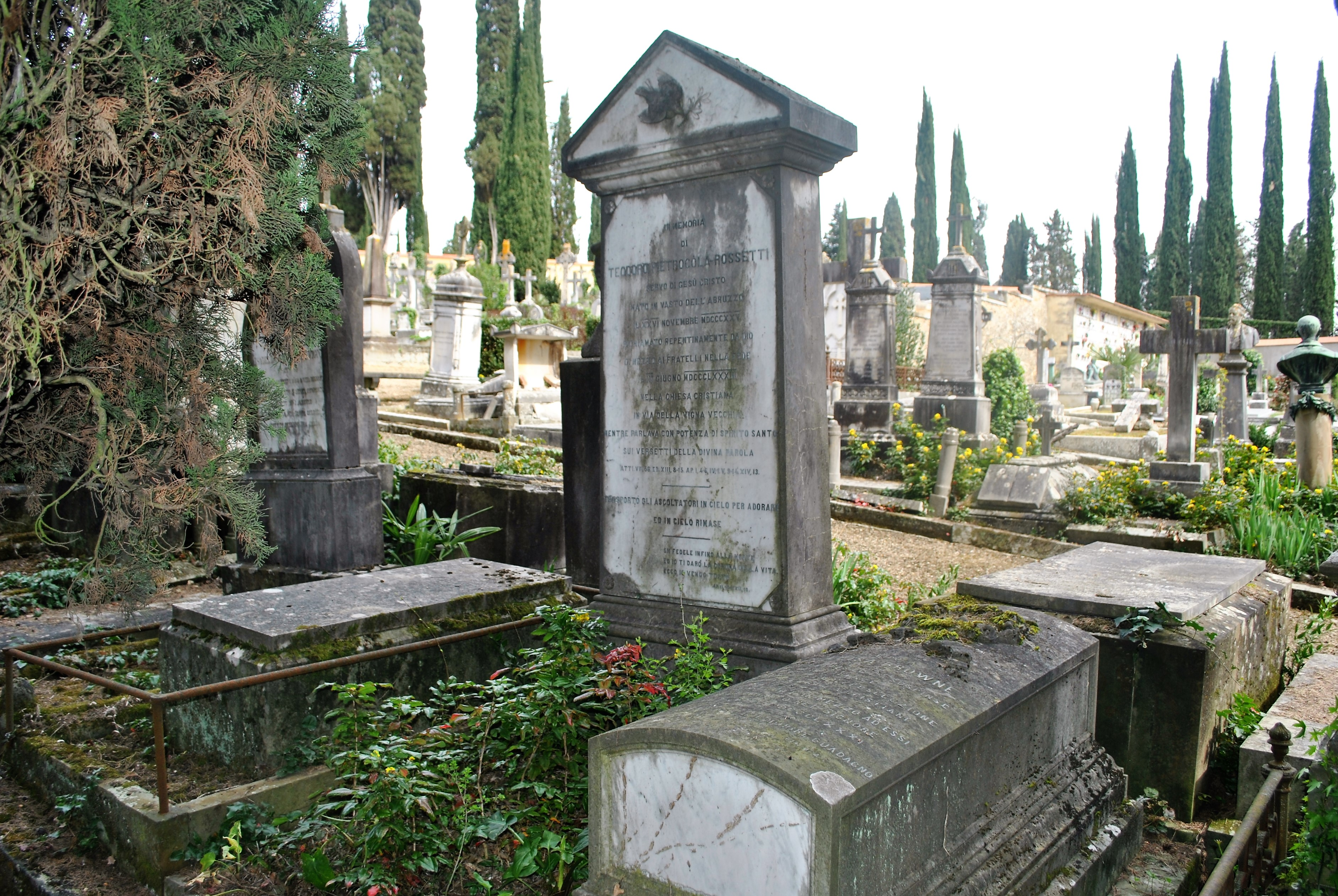
Teodorico Pietrocola Rossetti

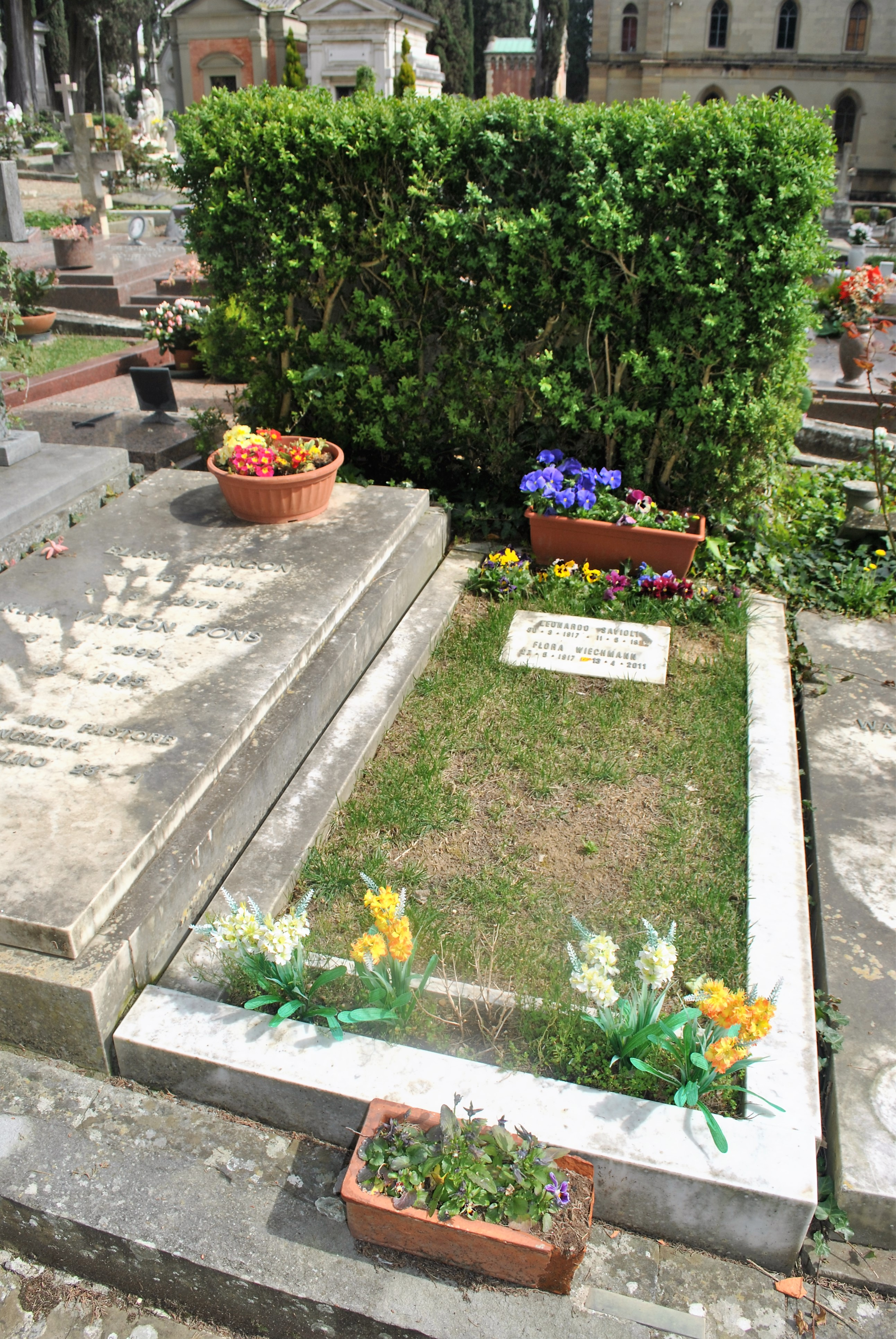
Leonardo Savioli

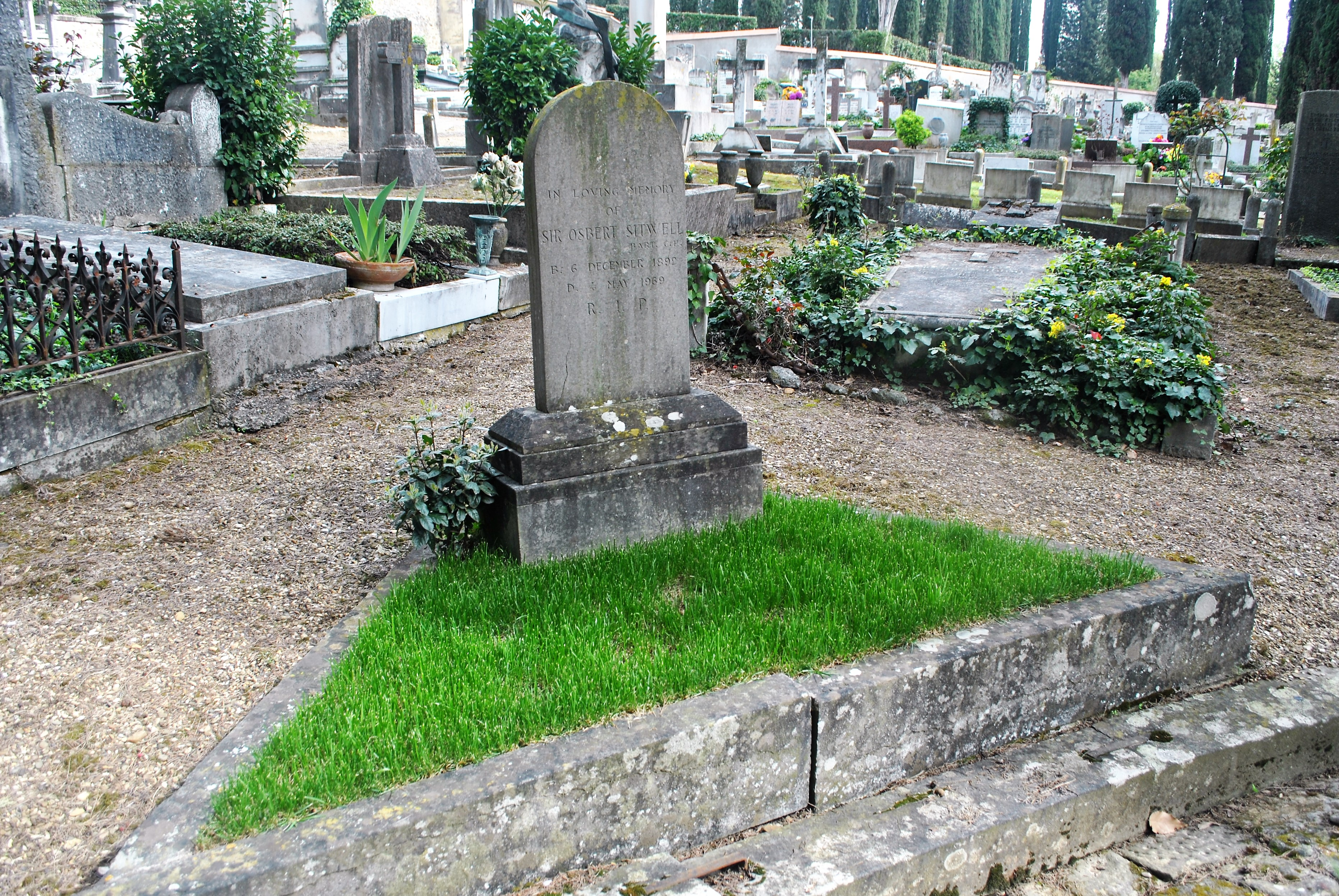
Osbert Sitwell

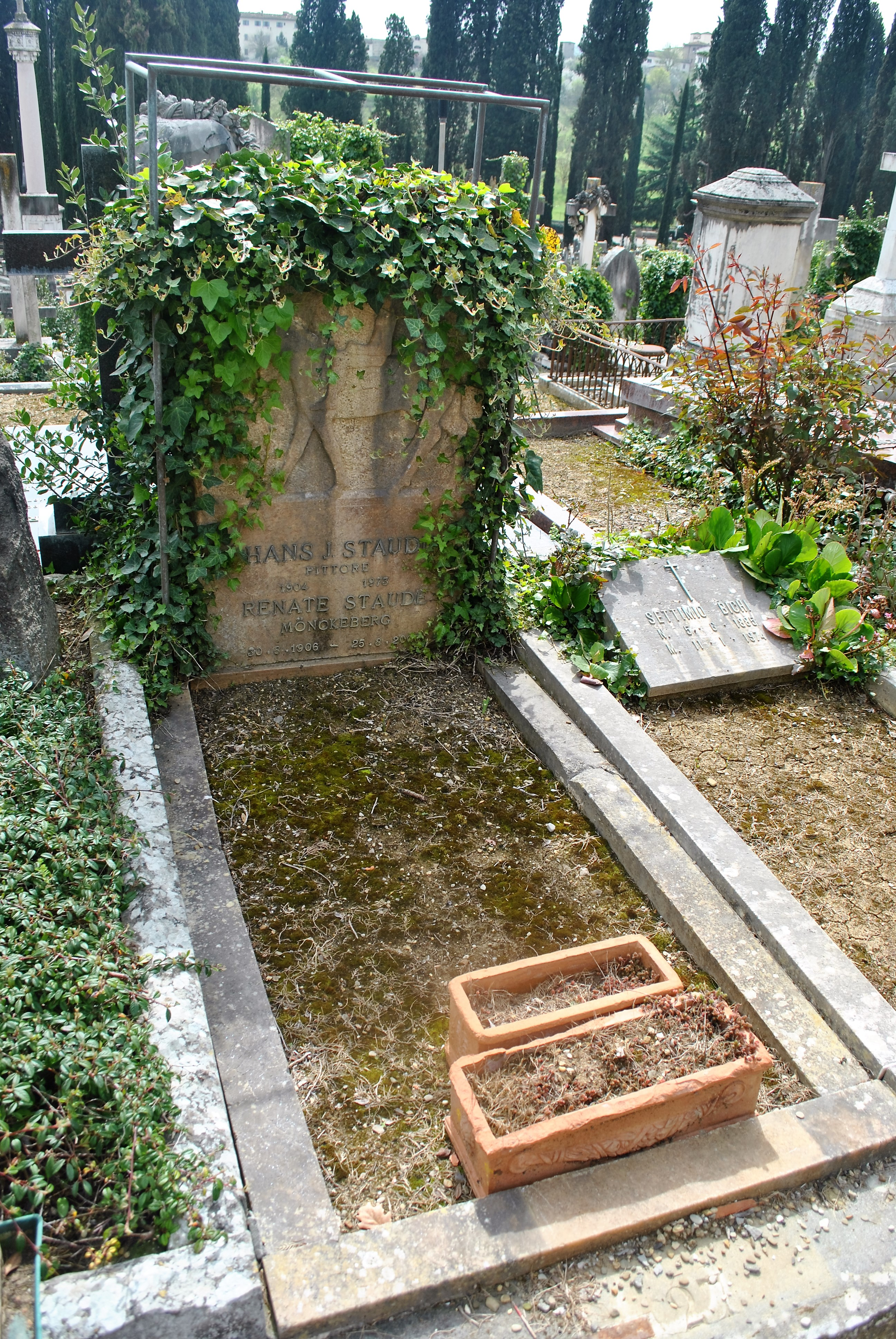
Hans Joachim Staude

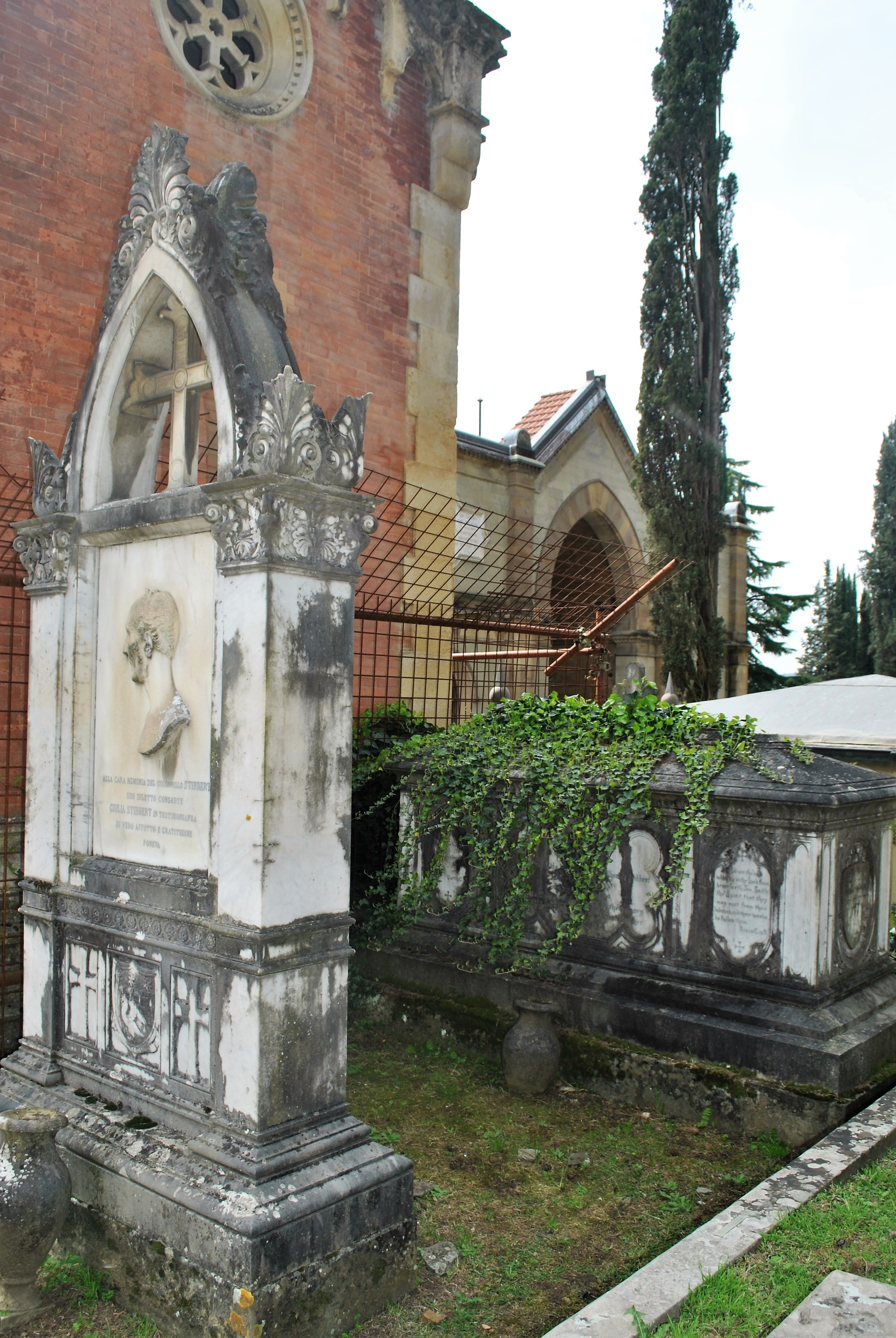
Frederick Stibbert

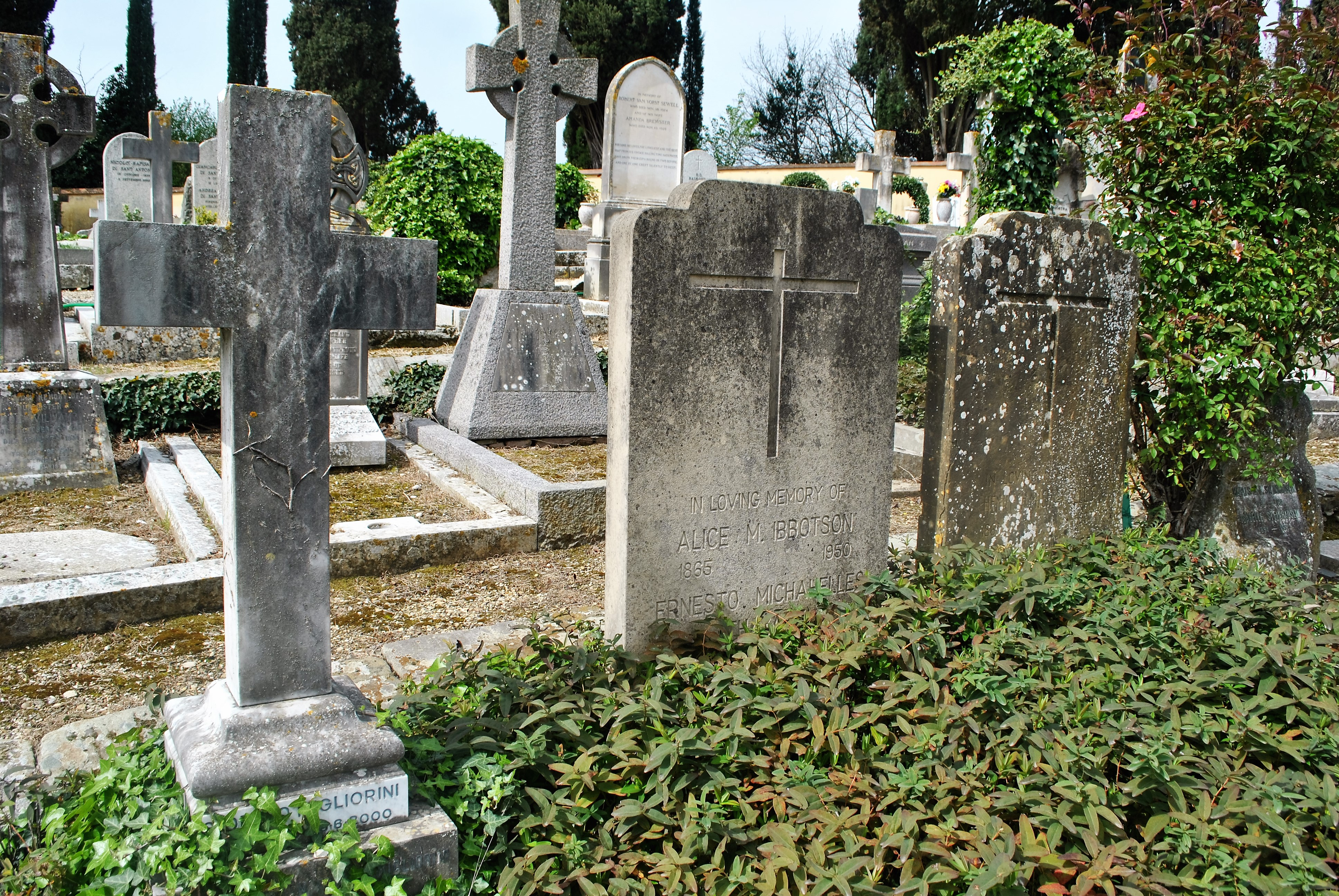
Ernesto Michahelles Thayaht

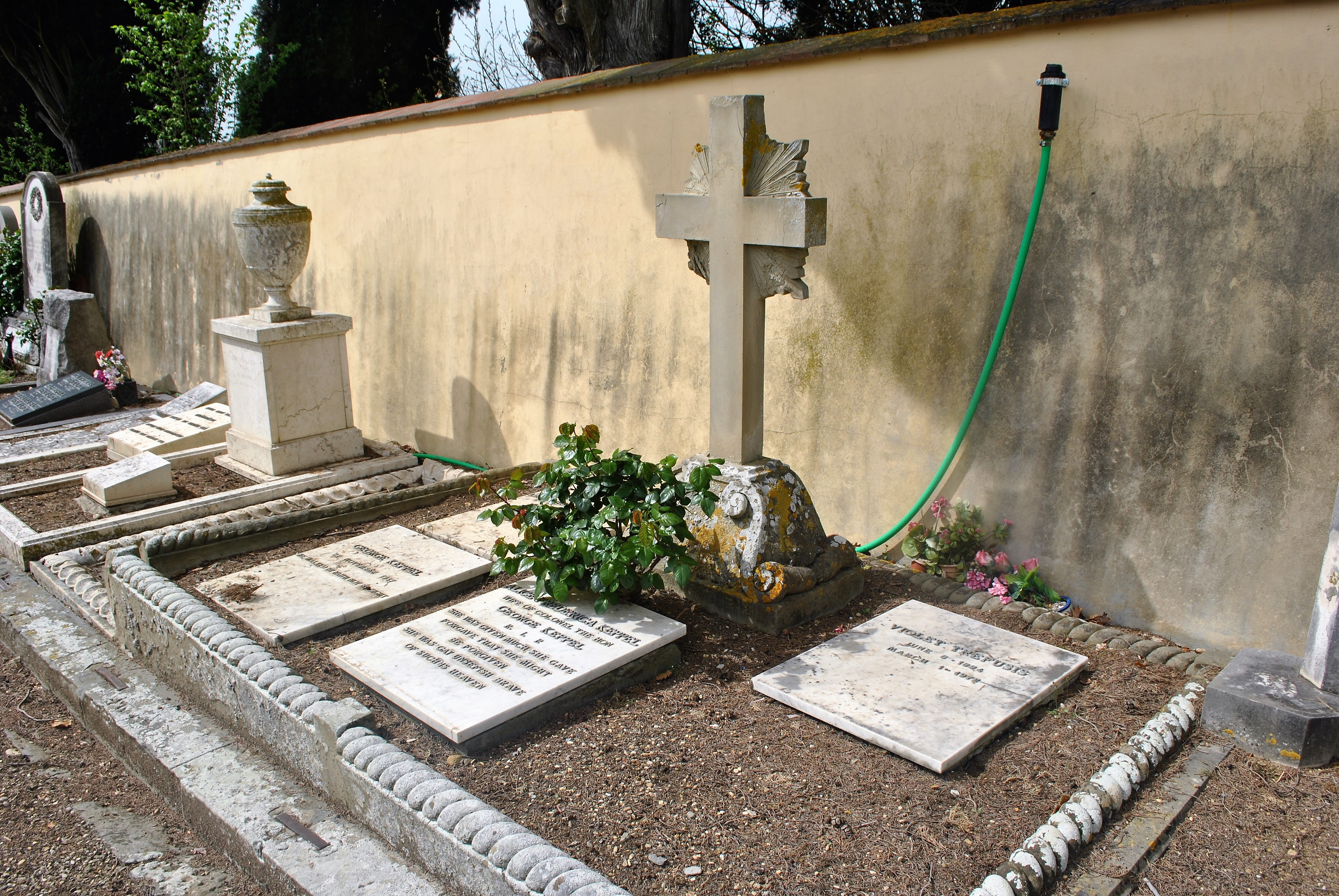
Violet Trefusis

== See also ==
- English Cemetery, Florence
