= English Cemetery, Florence =

Cemetery in Toscana, Italy

Coordinates: 43°46′39.09″N 11°16′05.39″E

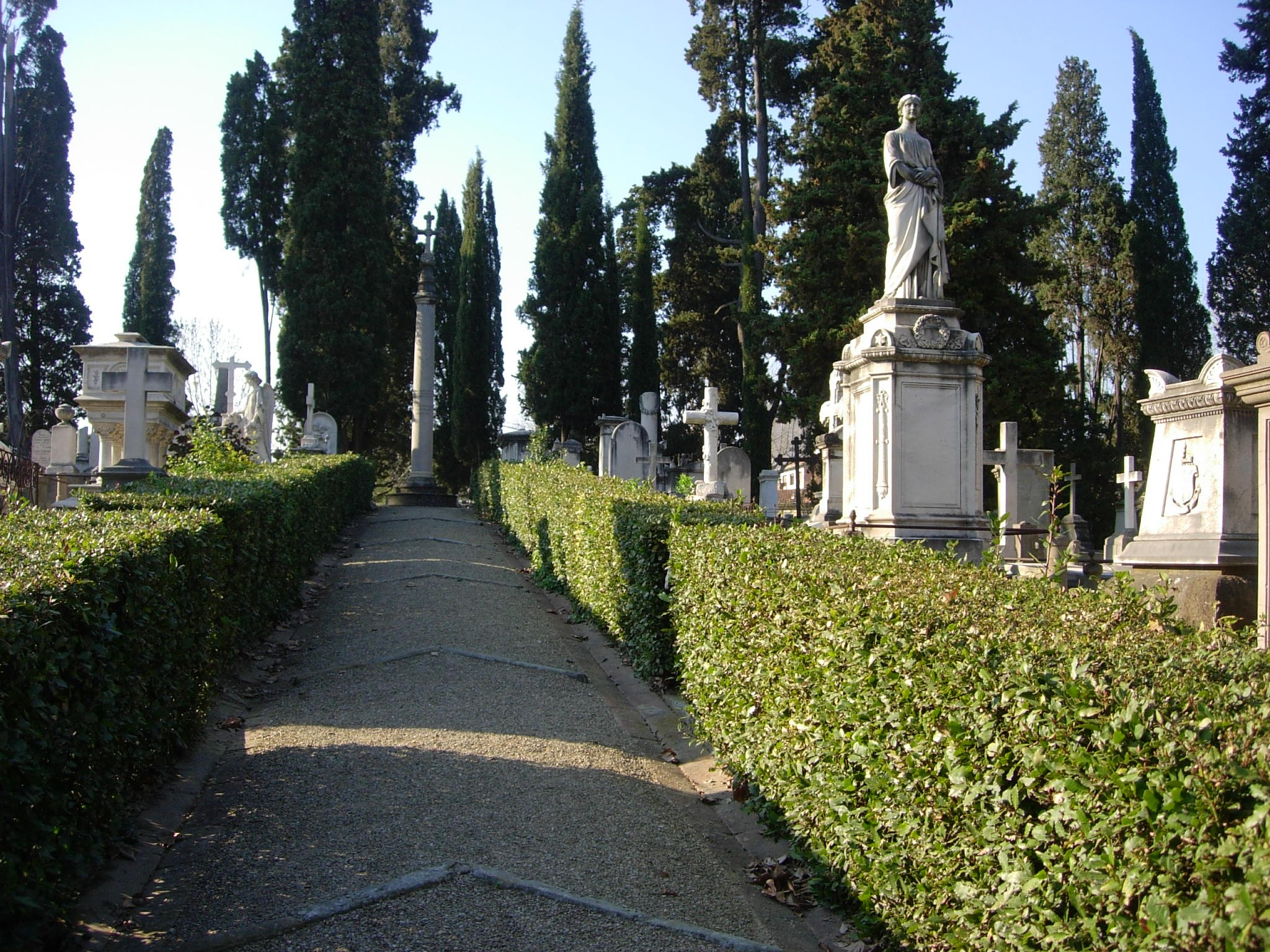
The Cimitero degli Inglesi

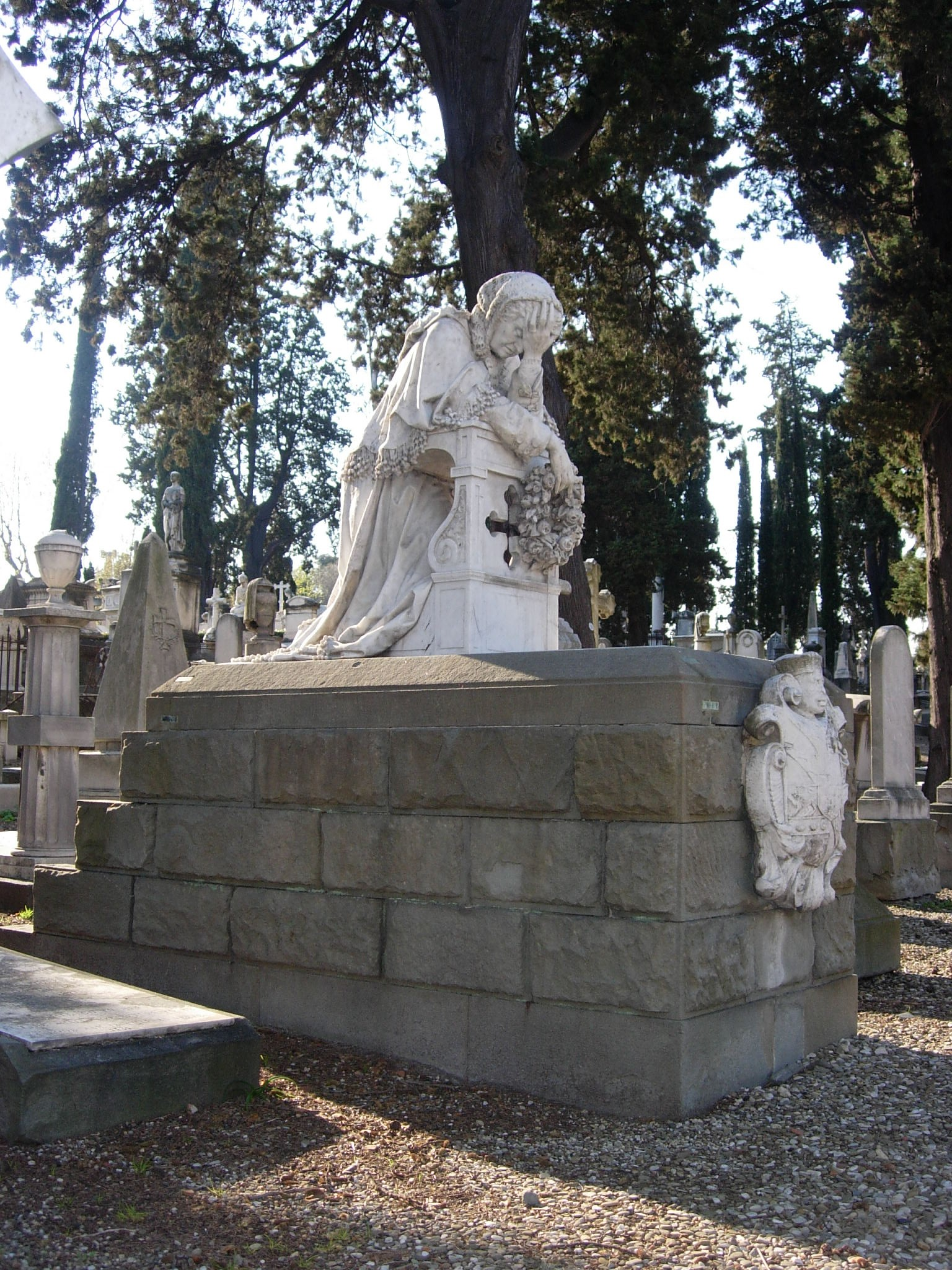
A tomb at the English Cemetery

The English Cemetery in Florence, Italy (Italian, Cimitero degli inglesi, Cimitero Porta a' Pinti and Cimitero Protestante) is an Evangelical cemetery located at Piazzale Donatello. Although its origins date to its foundation in 1827 by the Swiss Evangelical Reformed Church, the name "English Cemetery" results from the majority of its burials being Protestants from the British and American communities of Florence, and who gave the largest sum of money for the purchase of its land. The cemetery also holds the bodies of non-English speaking expatriates who died in Florence, among them Swiss and Scandinavians, as well as Eastern Orthodox Christians, among them Russians and Greeks. The cemetery is still owned by the Swiss Evangelical Reformed Church, and is open for the interment of cremated ashes, now of all Christian denominations, but no longer for burials.

== History ==
Before 1827, non-Catholics who died in Florence were buried in the Old English Cemetery, Livorno, the city then known to English-speakers as Leghorn. (The Jewish monumental cemetery, Florence had been established in 1777.) In 1827 the Swiss Evangelical Reformed Church acquired land outside the medieval wall and gate of Porta a' Pinti from Leopold II, Grand Duke of Tuscany for an international and ecumenical cemetery, Russian and Greek Orthodox burials joining the Protestant ones. A young architectural student, Carlo Reishammer, landscaped the cemetery. Giuseppe Poggi then shaped it as its present oval when Florence became capital of Italy in 1865. He surrounded it with studios for artists, including that of Michele Gordigiani, who painted the portraits of Elizabeth Barrett and Robert Browning, now in the National Portrait Gallery, London.

== Burials ==
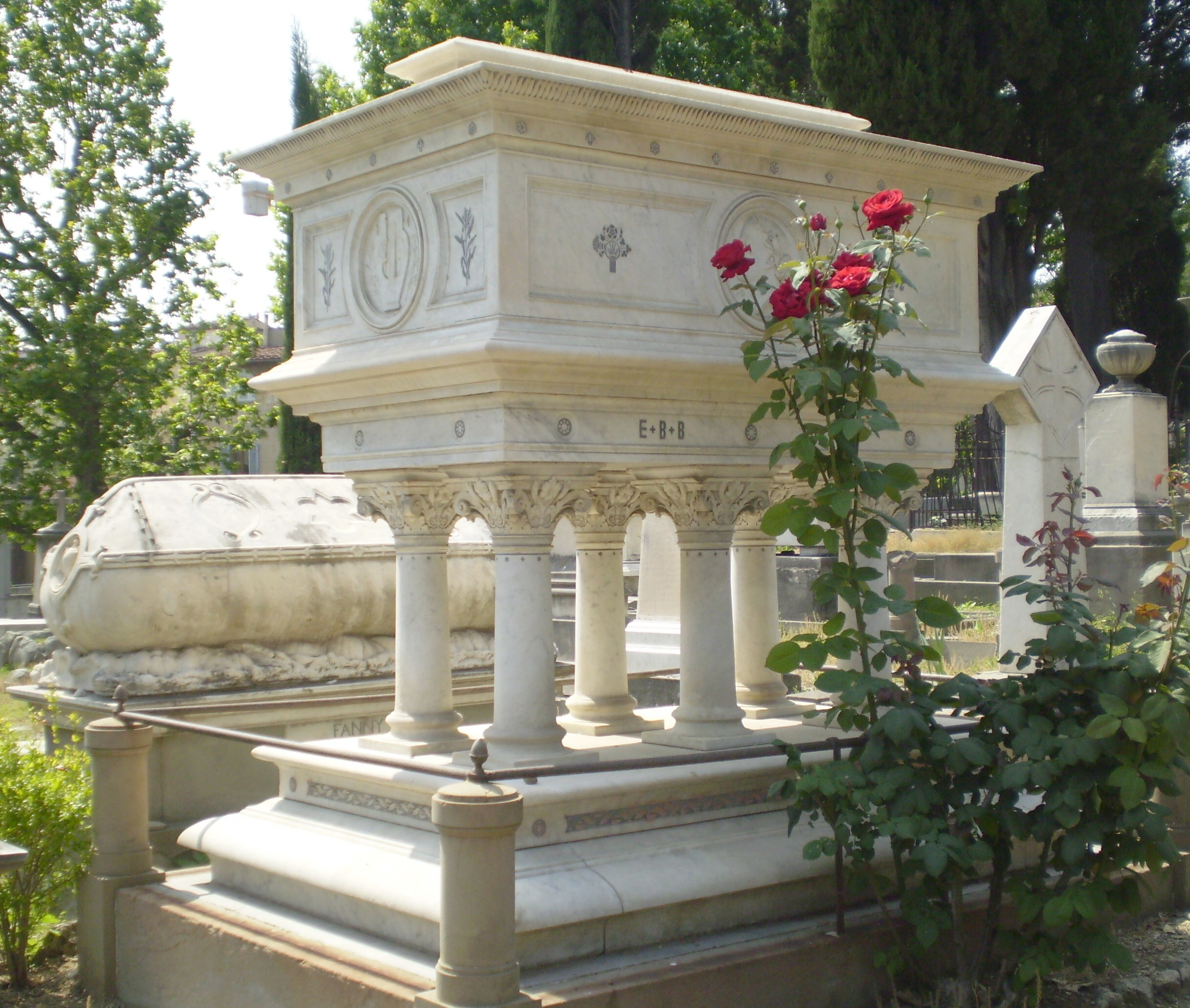
Tomb of Elizabeth Barrett Browning

Among the many Swiss, Russians, Americans and British buried here, those of the English-speaking British and Americans are the majority as the Anglophone community in Florence in the nineteenth century was the largest.

Many famous people are buried in the graveyard: Elizabeth Barrett Browning (in a tomb designed by Frederic, Lord Leighton), Walter Savage Landor, Arthur Hugh Clough, Francesca Trollope, Fanny Trollope and her daughter-in-law Theodosia Trollope and three other family members, Isa Blagden, Thomas Southwood Smith, Hiram Powers, Joel Tanner Hart, Theodore Parker, Mary Farhill, Fanny, the wife of William Holman Hunt in a tomb he himself sculpted, Mary, the daughter of John Roddam Spencer Stanhope in a tomb he himself sculpted, Sir David Dumbreck, Doctor Bartolomeo Odicini, Louise, sister to Henry Adams, whose dying he describes in his 'Chaos' chapter in The Education of Henry Adams, two children of the Greek painter George Mignaty, whom Robert had paint Casa Guidi as it was when Elizabeth Barrett Browning died there; Nadezhda De Santis, a black Nubian slave brought to Florence at fourteen from Jean-François Champollion's 1827 expedition to Egypt and Nubia, while the French Royalist exile Félicie de Fauveau sculpted two tombs here.

American historian, abolitionist and author Richard Hildreth, who died in Florence in 1865 after resigning his position as consul in Trieste, is also buried here near the grave of Transcendentalist minister and abolitionist Theodore Parker. These two tombs were toppled in the great storm of 19 September 2014 and are now restored.

Giovan Pietro Vieusseux, Swiss, the founder of the Gabinetto Vieusseux (where John Ruskin, Fyodor Mikhailovich Dostoevsky, Sarah Parker Remond, and Robert Browning were readers), is also buried here; and likewise the Swiss historian Jacques Augustin Galiffe, who with Jean Charles Léonard Simonde de Sismondi pioneered genealogical, archival research, and his wife Emilie, daughter of Charles Pictet. Emily Dickinson treasured a photograph of Elizabeth Barrett Browning's tomb and wrote 'The soul selects her own society' about it, using lines also from Elizabeth Barrett Browning's Aurora Leigh; and Elizabeth Barrett Browning wrote a sonnet on Hiram Powers' sculpture The Greek Slave, which had been at the center of the Crystal Palace Exhibition, London, in 1851. Isa Blagden and Theodosia Garrett Trollope, part East Indian, part Jewish, were models for Miriam in Nathaniel Hawthorne's The Marble Faun, while George Mignaty's wife was the model for the head of Hiram Powers' Greek Slave. The cemetery is also the partial subject of Arnold Boecklin's Isle of the Dead, from its burial of his seven-month daughter, Maria Anna. In turn, the composer Sergei Rachmaninoff made use of Boecklin's painting for his Op. 29, The Isle of the Dead. Thus this cemetery forms a compendious memorial of western creativity, from America to Russia, from Scandinavia to Nubia, during Italy's 19th-century Risorgimento.

Mary Ancrum Young (c. 1790–1867), widow of Rev. Robert Young, D.D., minister of the Scots Church, London Wall, is also buried here. Her tomb bears a dedicatory inscription from her adopted daughter Robinia Elizabeth Young and Robinia's husband, the Italian physicist Carlo Matteucci, whom Robinia married at Marylebone Church, London, on 7 September 1846.

James Lorimer Graham Jr., American consul in Florence when the city was capital.

=== Inscriptions ===
The tomb inscriptions are in Hebrew, Greek, Cyrillic, fraktura and Roman scripts, and in many languages – Hebrew, Russian, French, German, Danish, Romansh, English — and include passages of the Bible in vernacular translations (inscribed at a time when only a Latin translation was accessible to Roman Catholics).

== Closure and re-opening ==
The cemetery had to be closed in 1877, when the law forbade burials of bodies within city limits.

The Scorpioni, a small group of elderly English ladies who lived in the city in the 1930s and 1940s, used to frequent the cemetery. Franco Zeffirelli based his semi-autobiographical film Tea with Mussolini on these expatriates.

The Comune of Florence has now allowed the Swiss Church to reopen the cemetery for burials, but only of cremated remains, not bodies.

The custodian of the cemetery is medieval scholar Julia Bolton Holloway, formerly a nun of the Anglican order Community of the Holy Family. Under her auspices, a library has been gathered, including books by and about those buried in the cemetery. Research is being carried out on the burial records in Britain, Russia and Italy, these being published in the virtual guidebook. An appeal seeks to continue restoring the cemetery after many years of neglect and abandonment. Its former beauty is recorded in Victorian era guidebooks and early sepia photographs, particularly those taken by Hiram Powers's son, Longworth Powers, now in the Gabinetto Vieusseux.

== See also ==
- Cimitero Evangelico agli Allori – Cemetery in Florence, Italy
- Protestant Cemetery, Rome – Non-catholic cemetery in Rome, Italy
- English Cemetery, Bagni di Lucca
