= Charles Loeser =

American art historian and art collector (1864-1928)

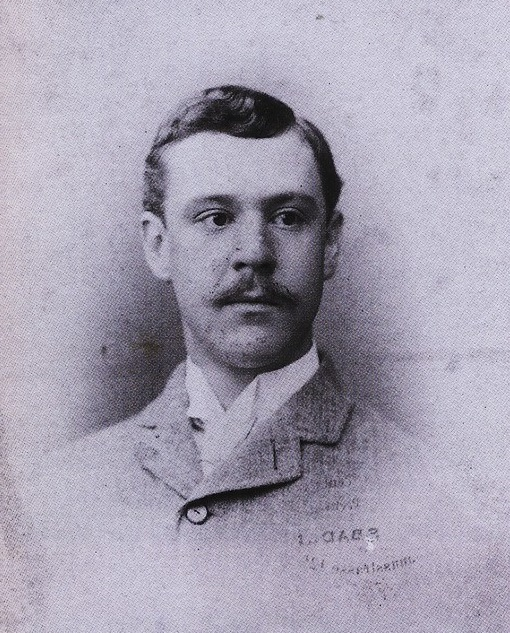
- Born: January 11, 1864; New York, New York
- Died: March 15, 1928 (aged 64); New York, New York
- Resting place: Cimitero degli Allori
- Education: Harvard University
- Occupations: Art historian, collector

Charles Alexander Loeser (January 11, 1864 – March 15, 1928) was an American art historian and art collector.

== Life ==
Charles Loeser was born in New York City on January 11, 1864, into a family of German origin: his father, Frederick Loeser (1833-1911), founded Frederick Loeser & Co. After completing his Master of Arts degree in Philosophy at Harvard University in 1888, Charles Loeser decided to travel to Europe and visit his friend and fellow Harvard alumnus, George Santayana.

Loeser settled in Florence in 1890, where he met and married German pianist Olga Lebert Kaufmann. He spent the rest of his life here collecting and studying Medieval and early Renaissance art and furniture. Loesser purchased his Villa Torri Gattaia, nestled in the Florentine hills behind San Miniato al Monte, around 1908 and started on renovations. In Florence, Loeser devoted himself to his studies and the collecting of works of art, and furniture that was flooding the market at the turn of the century.

== Collection ==
At his death, Loeser's collection totalled over 1,000 pieces. it contained over two hundred and fifty Old Master prints and drawings, numerous period furnishings, paintings, sculptures and works of applied art. Most were works of Italian Medieval and Renaissance art, but there were also contemporary works, such as a collection of Cézanne paintings. Loeser was one of the first collectors to appreciate Cézanne. The whole collection was characterized by the austere sobriety with which these precious antiques and works of art furnished the various rooms of the villa.

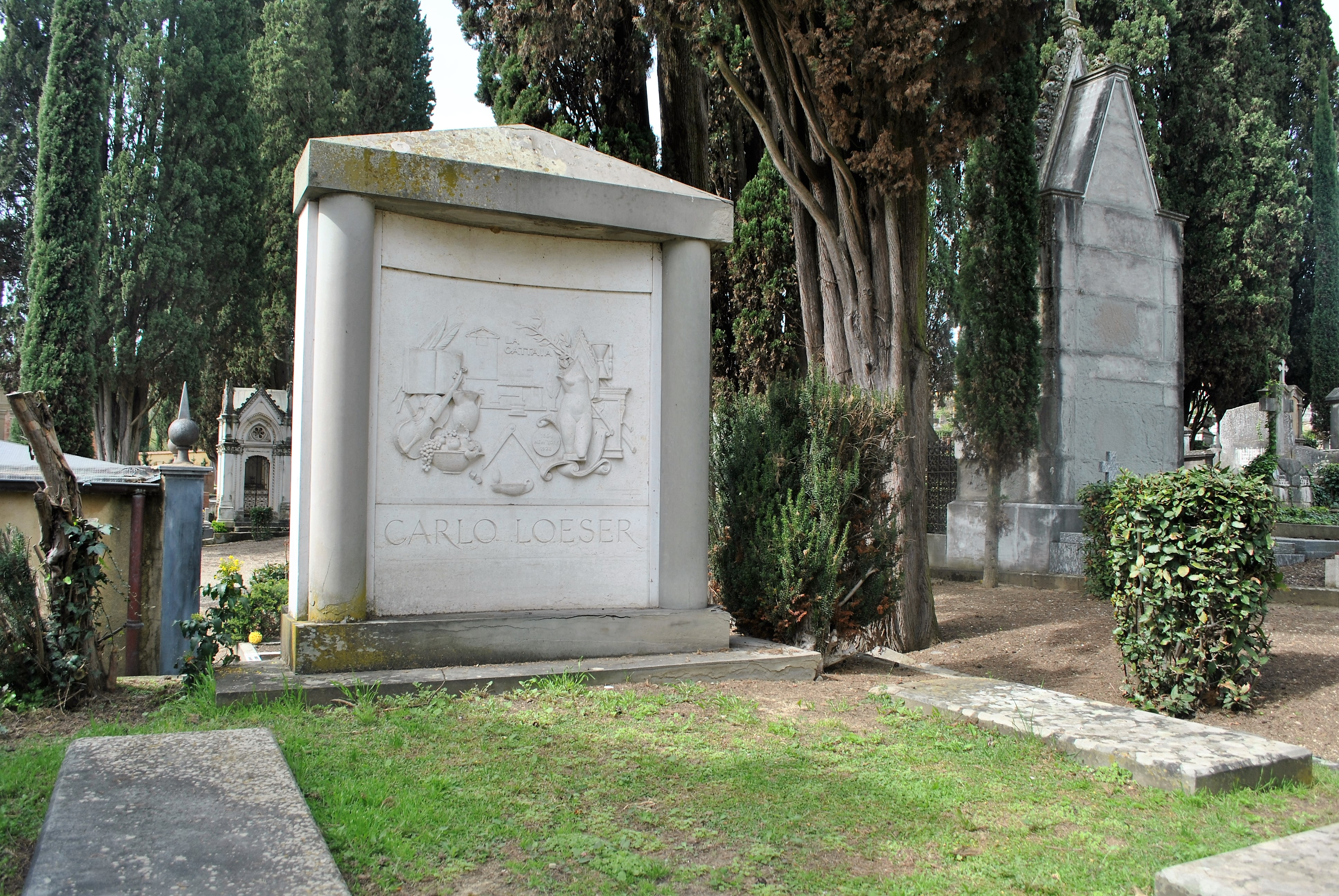
Loeser's grave at Cimitero degli Allori

Loeser died at the Ritz-Carlton Hotel during a visit to New York on March 15, 1928, and was buried at Cimitero Evangelico agli Allori in Florence. In his will, he directed that the collection of Old Master prints and drawings go to the Fogg Art Museum at Harvard University, that the President of the United States would be able to choose eight of his prized Cézannes "to adorn the White House", and that the selection of over thirty works of art and period furnishings indicated by him should be bequeathed to the Florence City Council.

The Palazzo Vecchio took this collection which would later be known as the "Loeser Bequest". The Bequest still adorns the rooms of the Quartiere del Mezzanino of Palazzo Vecchio, laid out in line with aesthetic canons similar to those that characterized the interiors of the aristocratic mansions of Renaissance Florence, and which the collectors of Loeser's time tended to reproduce in their private residences. The collection was originally set up in the Mezzanino by curator Alfredo Lensi. He had the same vision that Loeser had arranged the space in the Florentine style which kept chronology and style separate from the aesthetic value of the works together. This collection can still be seen in the Palazzo Vecchio set up similarly to how Loeser would have lived with the pieces in his Villa.
