= Joel Tanner Hart =

American sculptor (1810–1877)

- Born: Joel Tanner Hart; February 10, 1810; Winchester, Kentucky, United States
- Died: March 2, 1877 (aged 67); Florence
- Notable work: Bust of Andrew Jackson (1838); Bust of Henry Clay (1847); Il Penseroso (1853); Woman Triumphant
- Movement: American antebellum

Joel Tanner Hart (February 10, 1810 – March 2, 1877) was an American sculptor.

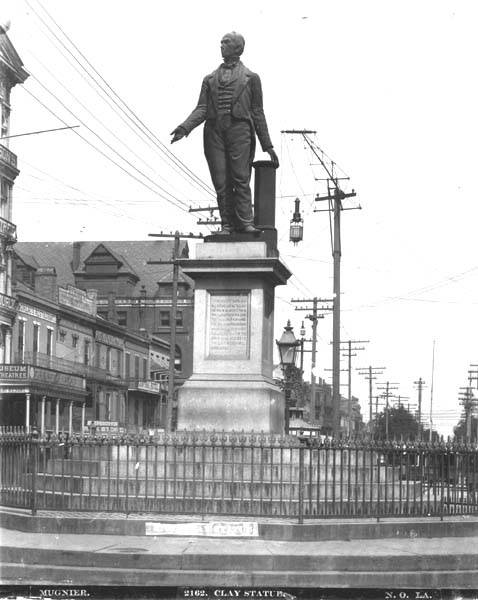
1860 statue of Henry Clay in New Orleans

== Life and work ==
Joel Tanner Hart was born February 10, 1810, near Winchester, in Clark County, Kentucky to Josiah Hart and Judith Tanner Hart and was a sculptor of importance during America's antebellum years. As a young man, he worked as a stone-cutter, developing his skills as a sculptor. In the 1840s he joined a growing artistic and literary community in Florence, Italy where he lived for the remainder of his life.

Joel Tanner Hart is best known for busts of Andrew Jackson (1838) and Henry Clay (1847). As well, he carved those of John Jordan Crittenden and Cassius M. Clay and created the statues called Il Penseroso (1853) and Woman Triumphant that stood at the Fayette County courthouse until it was destroyed by fire in 1897.

He also sculpted the bas-relief for the tombstone of Southwood Smith in the English Cemetery in Florence. Hart died in Florence in 1877 and was buried in the same English Cemetery. By Legislative Act, his remains were later exhumed and returned to his native state of Kentucky for reinterment in the Frankfort Cemetery in Frankfort, Kentucky on June 18, 1887.

== Archival collections ==
1. Title: Joel T. Hart Letters, 1829-1864. Collection Number: 02797-z. The Wilson Special Collections Library. Polk Place. University of North Carolina. Chapel Hill Campus.
2. Title: Joel T. Hart Papers, 1836, 1876. Kentucky Historical Society. University of Kentucky.
3. Title: Joel Tanner Hart Poems. Catalog Number SC 1488. Kentucky Historical Society.
