= James Lorimer Graham Jr. =

American diplomat (1835–1876)

James Lorimer "Lorrie" Graham Jr. (January 21, 1835 – April 30, 1876) was the American Consul in Florence.

== Early life ==
James Lorimer "Lorrie" Graham Jr. was born in New York City on January 21, 1835, the son of Gen. Nathan Burr Graham. He was the brother of R.M.C. Graham, President of the Metropolitan Insurance Company and nephew of James Lorimer Graham and John A. Graham. His father, Gen. Nathan Burr Graham, belonged to a prominent New York family, and his mother, Marie Antoinette McCoskry, came of good old Scotch stock. Her uncle, Robert McCoskry, was one of the founders and the first President of the Chemical Bank.

Graham was educated in New York until he was about sixteen, and was then sent to Amiens, France, to complete his education. There he lived for some years with a cousin who had married a French gentleman of position and prominence, pursuing his studies. On account of his precocious literary skill he was selected to deliver a poetical address of welcome to Alphonse de Lamartine, when that statesman visited the school in 1848. Afterwards he spent some time in Paris in completing his education.

During his sojourn abroad he became a proficient French scholar, and retained all his life his fluency and perfect accent, so rare to any foreigner, and was often mistaken for a Frenchman.

== Career ==
After graduation he lived for a time in Rio Janeiro, Brazil. Back to New York City he left again aboard of the steamer USS San Francisco from New York to San Francisco, first steamship which attempted to make the trip and which sank off Cape Hatteras. Walt Whitman was a fellow passenger, and composed a poem about the shipwreck. The ship belonged to the old shipping house of Rowland & Aspinwall, with whom Graham was then enrolled as a clerk. He and one of the younger Aspinwalls were the only passengers in the cabin; but the ship carried many emigrants; and when it was wrecked, the passengers were picked up by different sailing vessels, and carried off to various ports; so that many weeks elapsed after the loss of the ship was reported before Lorrie appeared once more at his father's home in New York, emaciated from illness, starvation and exposure, and having saved nothing but the clothes on his back, and one opal stud. The injuries he sustained left him lasting physical disturbances.

He was a librarian and editor of the Putnam's Magazine, a monthly periodical featuring American literature and articles on science, art, and politics. Circa 1869 he was named United States Consul General in Florence. When the capital was transferred to Rome, Graham remained behind, preferring to accept the simple position of Consul rather than change his Italian home.

He was a member of the Century Club and one of its first librarians, and was a member of the Geographical Society.

== Personal life ==
On November 19, 1855, he married Josephine A. Garner (1837-1892), the daughter of Thomas Garner, a wealthy merchant of New York and sister of Commodore William T. Garner. In New York City he lived at 3 E. 17th Street, while in Florence he resided at Casa Guidi, Palazzo di Valfonda and Via Manzoni. His homes were described as open with hospitality to "his countrymen".

It has been suggested that, even if married, Graham was gay.

He was friends with painters and sculptors: John Frederick Kensett, Frederic Edwin Church, Régis François Gignoux, Emanuel Leutze, John Cranch and Christopher Pearse Cranch, Eastman Johnson, William Holman Hunt, Hiram Powers, George Henry Boughton, F. O. C. Darley, Albert Bierstadt, Thomas Couture, George Henry Yewell, Thomas Ball, Jervis McEntee, Launt Thompson; writers in prose and verse: Bayard Taylor, Richard Monckton Milnes, 1st Baron Houghton, Henry Wadsworth Longfellow, Charles Astor Bristed, George Perkins Marsh, Robert Browning, Anthony Trollope, Richard Henry Stoddard, Elizabeth Stoddard, Edmund Clarence Stedman, Algernon Charles Swinburne, Adelaide Anne Procter, Thomas Buchanan Read, Ralph Waldo Emerson, Henry James, Alexander Wheelock Thayer; actors, statesmen and men of affairs: John Lorimer Worden, George B. McClellan, Cardinal John McCloskey, Charlotte Cushman, and Edwin Booth.

He died on April 30, 1876, in Florence, and is buried inside the English Cemetery, Florence, the medallion on his tombstone is by Launt Thompson. Bayard Taylor wrote his obituary in The New York Tribune. His wife later remarried to Giuseppe Mateini.

== Legacy ==
He left his Library and collections to the Century Association of New York.
