= Longworth Powers =

American photographer and sculptor

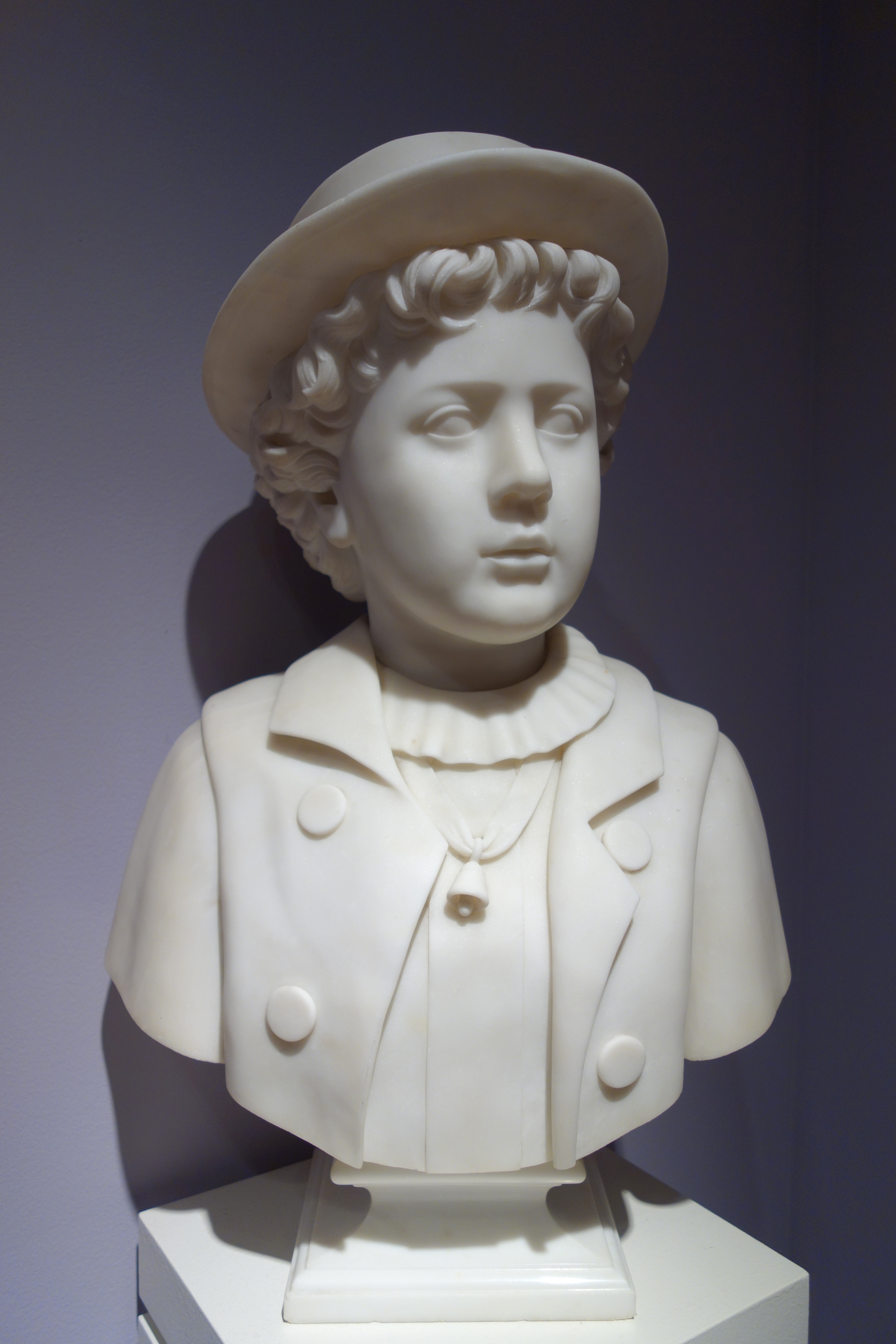
Young Boy by Longworth Powers, c. 1870-1880

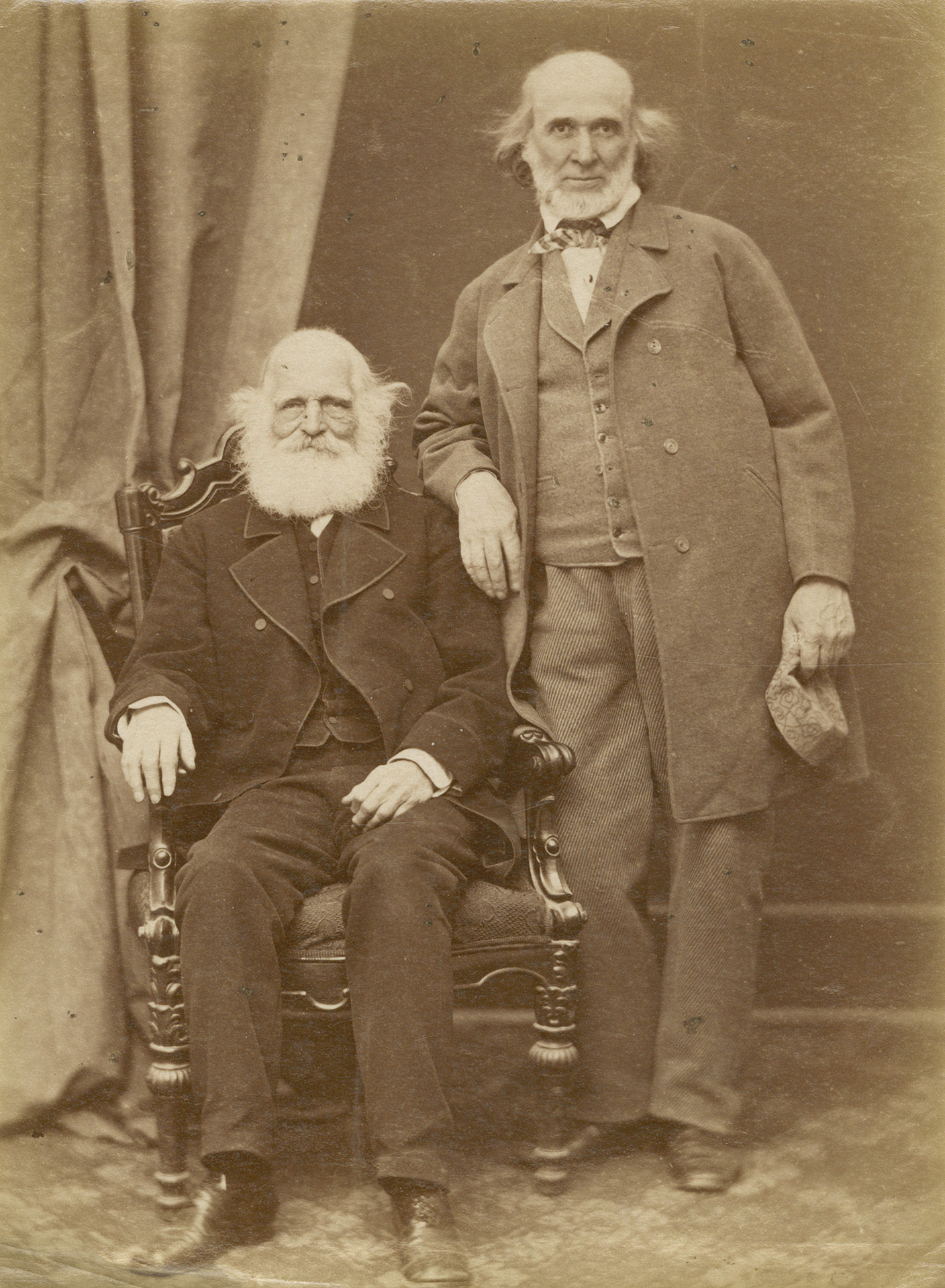
Photograph of William Cullen Bryant and Hiram Powers by Longworth Powers, 1867, albumen print

Longworth Powers (1835–1904) was an American photographer and sculptor, active in Florence, Italy.

Powers was born in Cincinnati, Ohio as the eldest son of sculptor Hiram Powers. He spent one semester at the United States Military Academy at West Point, after which he was asked to leave, and then attended Rensselaer Polytechnic Institute without obtaining a degree. After his family moved to Florence in 1835, Powers worked as a bookkeeper in his father's studio and learned the sculptor's craft. He returned to America for some years but in 1860 returned to Florence as a photographer and sculptor. He died in Florence.
