= Piazzale Donatello =

Coordinates: 43°46′41.22″N 11°16′3.71″E

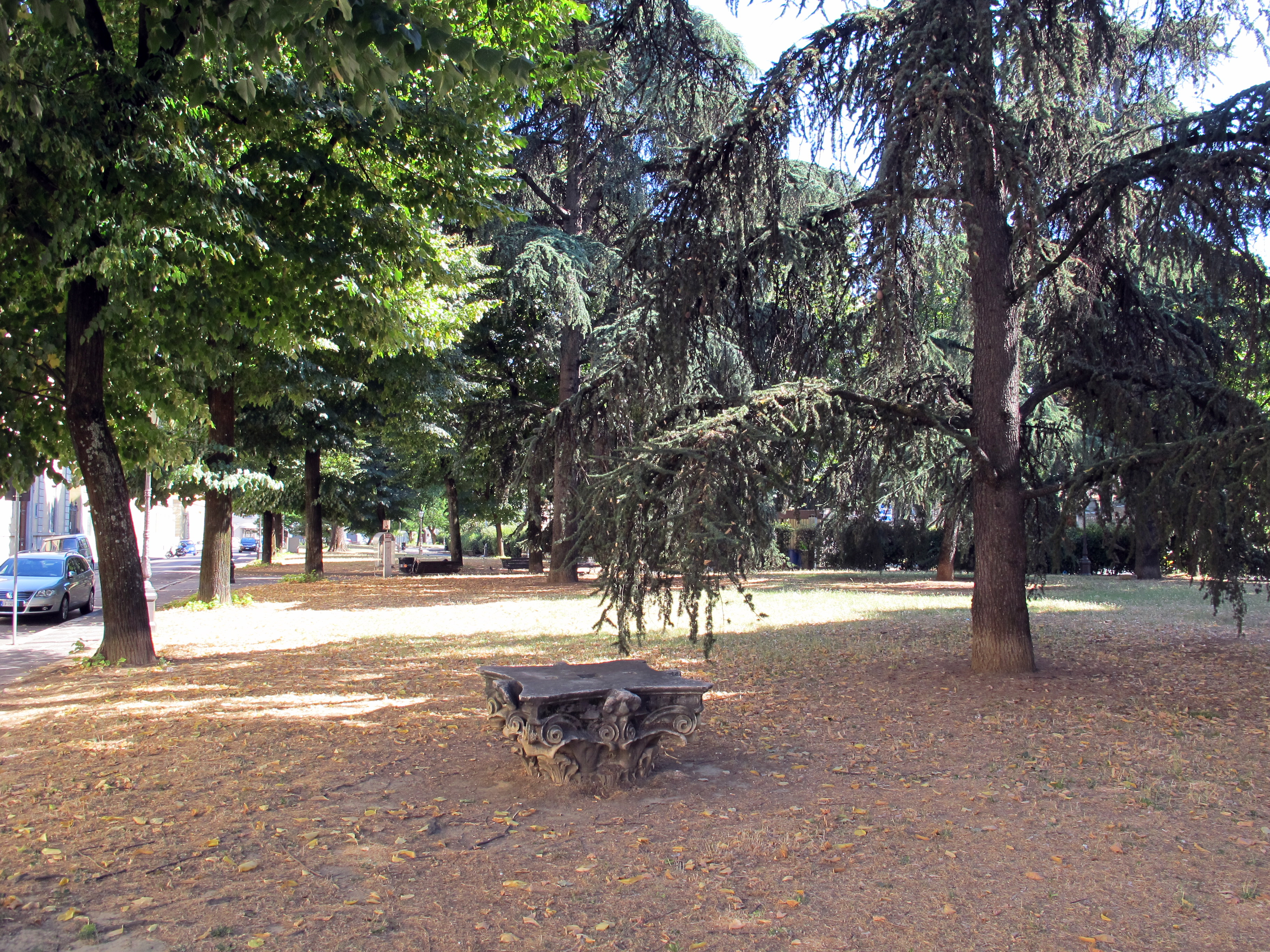
Piazzale Donatello

Piazzale Donatello is a city square in Florence, Italy. The square is lined by purpose-built artists studio's constructed during the nineteenth century. Each boasts expansive north facing windows. These studios saw the likes of many notable painters, among them Gianni Vagnetti and Michele Gordigiani. The studios remain active to this day with painters working from life by natural light.

== Buildings around the square ==
- Porta a Pinti
- Convento di San Giusto alle mura
- English Cemetery, Florence
- Casa famiglia Santa Lucia
- Palazzo della Gherardesca
- Giardino della Gherardesca
- Villa Donatello

== Gallery ==
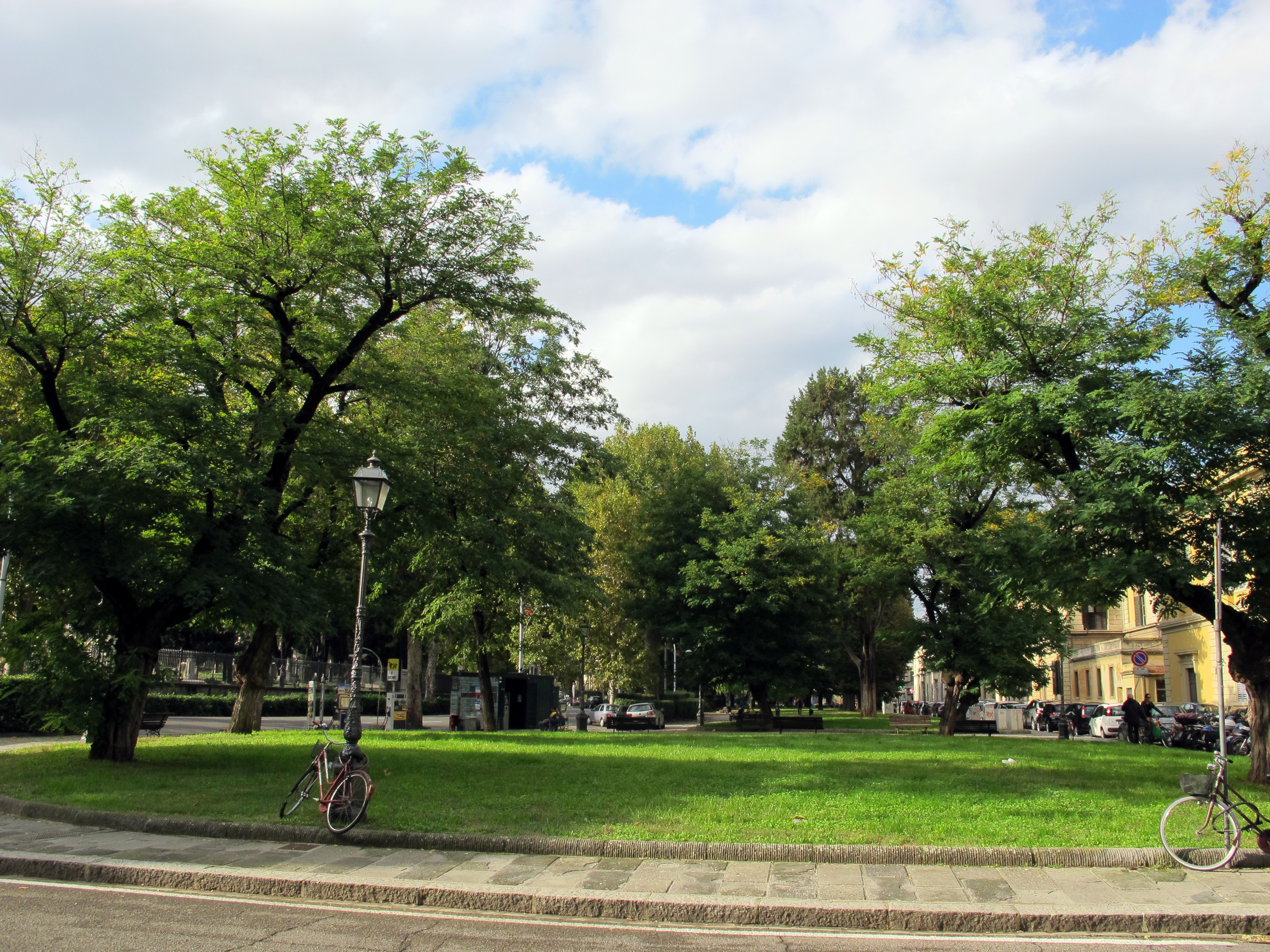
Piazzale Donatello

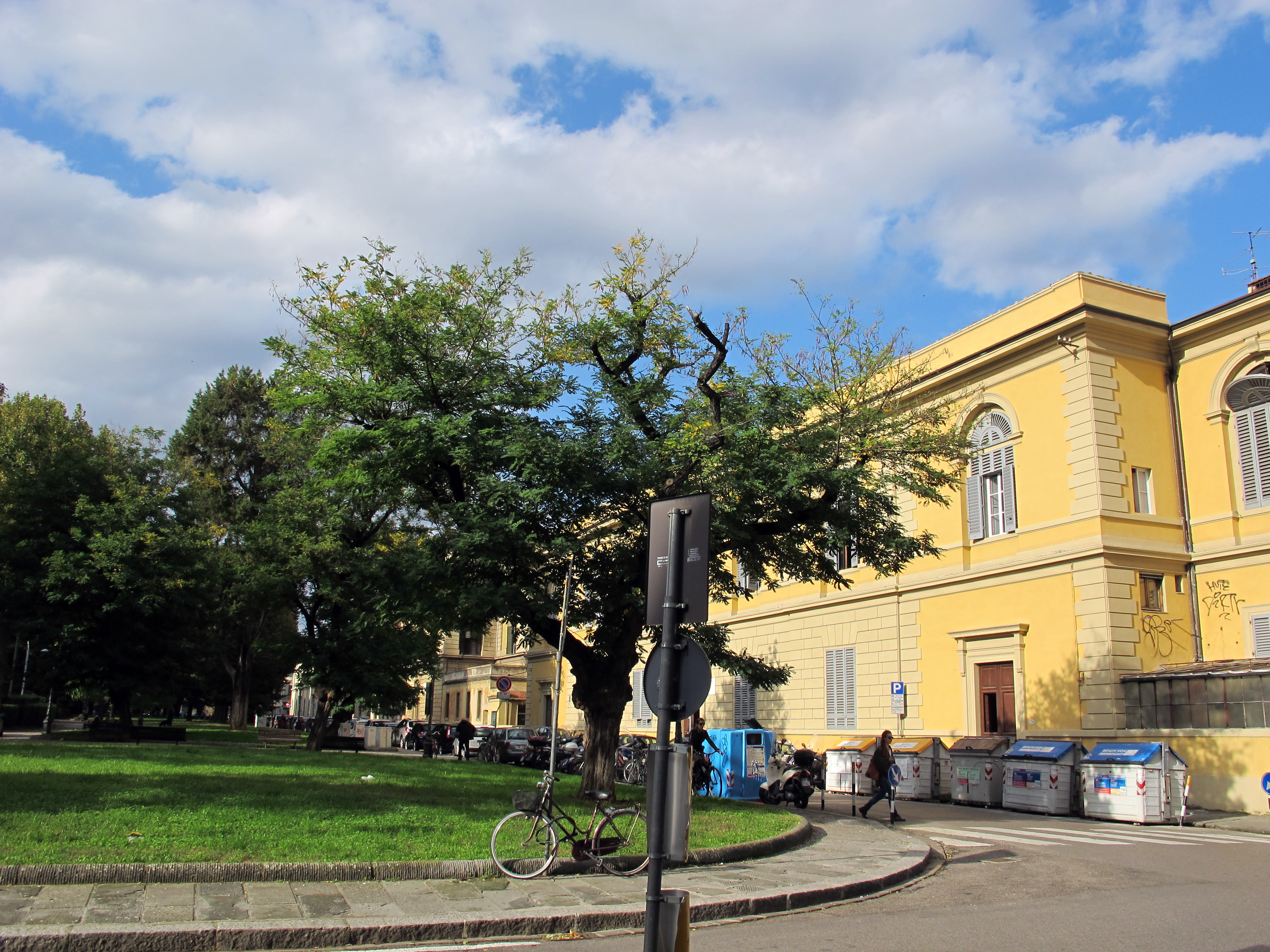
Piazzale Donatello

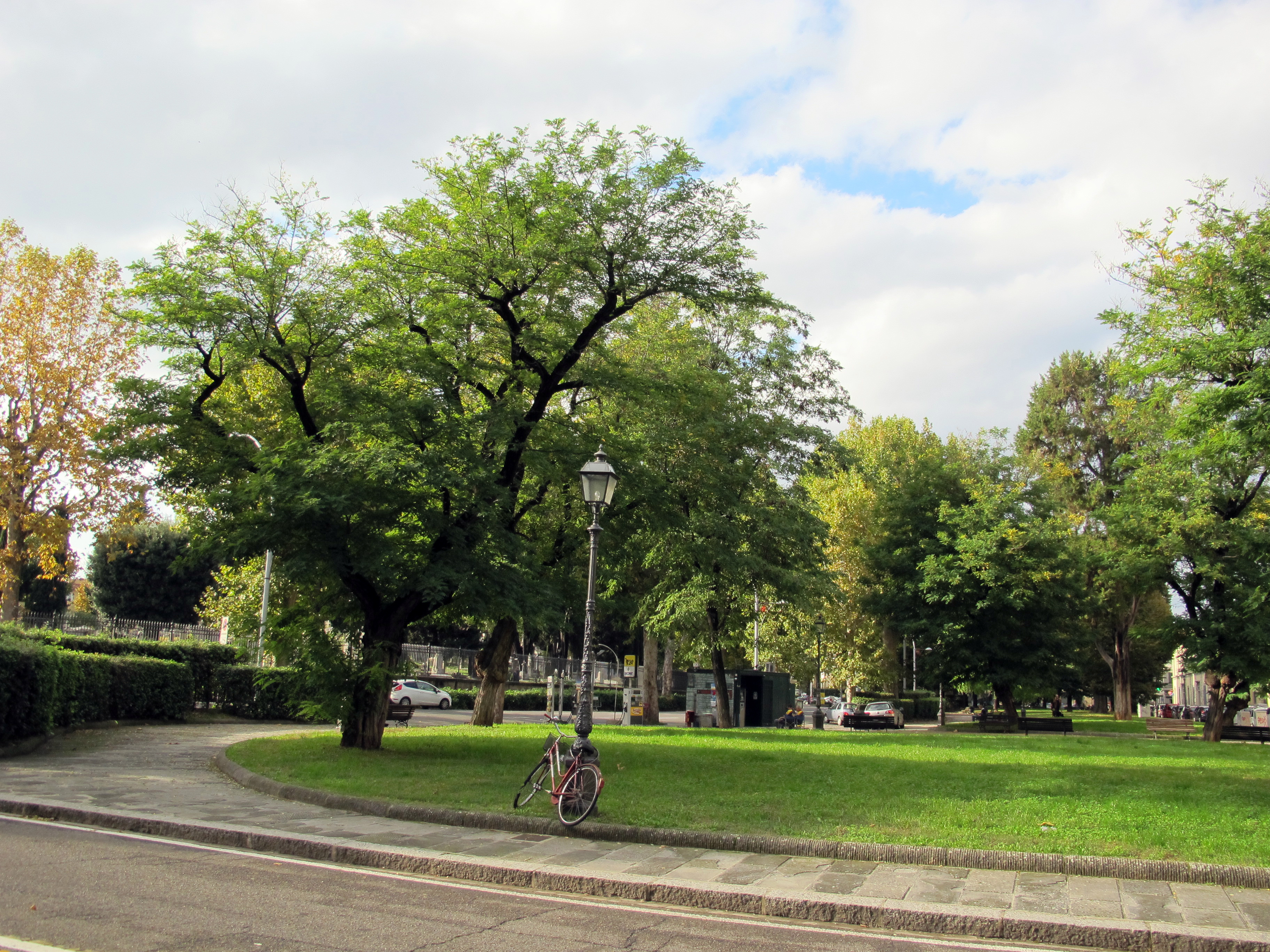
Piazzale Donatello
