= The Fool and the Flying Ship =

Audio performance based on Eastern European folk tale

The Fool and the Flying Ship, an audio performance based on the Eastern European folk tale, is a part of Rabbit Ears We All Have Tales series, and is narrated by Robin Williams, illustrated by Henrik Drescher and features music composed by the Klezmer Conservatory Band.

== Plot ==
The story starts out with the introduction of a peasant farmer and his wife and their three sons. The two elder sons were very clever, but the third son was a fool and was not as clever as his older brothers. One day, the Tsar of Russia proclaims that whoever builds a flying ship that can sail the sky will win the hand of his daughter, the princess. The two older brothers were eager to try their luck and their parents provided them with lavish provisions for their journey. Unfortunately, the older brothers never came back from their journey.

After some time passes, the youngest son wants to try out his luck at building the flying ship. Even though his parents just mock him and said that he will probably be eaten by a pack of wolves before he makes it, they decided to let him go on the journey but gives him poor provisions for his journey. As the Fool is walking towards the woods, he meets a man with eyebrows that jump like snowhares (literally) and the man asks the Fool where he is going. The Fool tells the man that he is going to build a flying ship to win the hand of the Tsar's daughter, but he does not know how to build such a ship. The old man then asks the Fool if he has anything to eat and the Fool tells the old man that he only has enough for himself but is willing to share the meal with him. When the Fool opens the bag, his poor meal turns into a lavish meal and he and the old man spend some time eating the food. Afterwards, the Fool falls asleep on the ground and when he wakes up, he finds a large flying ship (with chicken legs attached at the bottom) standing near him. The Fool climbs into the ship and starts to sail away over the land.

Along the way, the Fool meets several unusual companions on his trip, including a man who can eat everything triple his size, a man who has extremely sharp eyesight and carries a foot long gun, a man who can run faster than the wind, a man who can hear everything around the world, and a man who has incredible strength simply from his long hair. As the ship crew arrive at the Tsar's palace, the Tsar's small servant comes running to the Tsar and tells him that the ship is filled with a loud group of peasants. The Tsar is displeased at this and asks the servant what he should do about it. The servant tells the Tsar to set impossible tasks that they could never fulfill and the first task would be to eat one-thousand loaves of bread. The Fool sends the Eater to complete this task and the Eater eats all the loaves in a few seconds. The servant then sets a second task to retrieve the Equator from Africa and the Fool sends the Runner to complete this task. While in Africa, however, the Runner gets tired and falls asleep by a tree. The Fool and the others are worried about the Runner and the Sharpshooter spots the Runner sleeping by a tree in Africa and shoots at the flea that is sleeping on top of the Runner's Head. The Runner quickly runs back to the Tsar's palace and gives the equator to the Fool who gives it to the Tsar. The Tsar is deeply upset about this and so is his daughter, the princess, but the servant thinks of one last task.

The servant tells the Fool to get penguins from the South Pole and to complete this task by sunup tomorrow. The Fool tells this to his friends, and while they spot the penguins, they are in a dilemma as they do not know how to get the penguins from the South Pole. The Runner suggests that he should complete this task by running to the South Pole and then bring the penguins back to Russia, but the sharp shooter objects to this, because he had already used his last bullet to wake the runner up, so if the runner were to fall asleep like last time, he couldn't be awoken. Suddenly, the Puffer wakes up from his slumber and tells the others that he is going to puff up and therefore, he transforms into a strong heavy set man. The Puffer realizes that if they couldn't go to the South Pole, then he'd have to bring the South Pole to them. He then proceeds to pull the whole land towards them to get the penguins and just as the sun rises, the Puffer finally succeeds in getting the penguins to the Tsar's palace. When the Tsar wakes up the next morning, he sees all the penguins walking all over his palace grounds and gives the Fool his daughter's hand in marriage. Everything ends happily for everyone, well maybe except for the princess, but she got used to it.

== Reception ==
The Fool and the Flying Ship received many positive reviews from various sources. According to an article in Entertainment Weekly, the story received an A− and as stated by Ken Tucker, "Drescher's drawing is as blunt and cartoonish as Williams' narration, and together they make The Fool and the Flying Ship a lot of silly fun." Also, stated in an article from the Chicago Sun-Times by Ernest Tucker, "The quicksilver Williams has a ball in his tour de force role as the slightly Yiddish-accented fool. And the Klezmer Conservatory Band adds just the right inflections with its jazzy-yet-traditional music. The tape is a magical joy."

== See also ==
- Flying Ship (folk tale)
- The Fool of the World and the Flying Ship (1990 film)
- The Fool of the World and the Flying Ship (book)
