= Flying Ship =

East Slavic Folk Tale

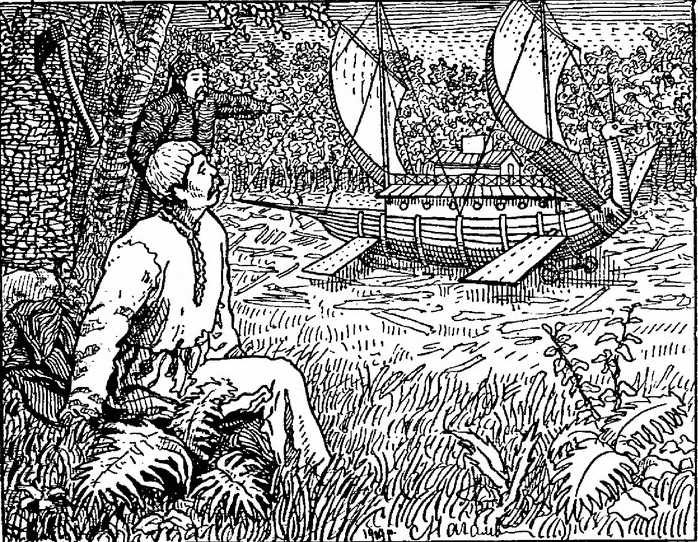
Drawing of the fairy tale from the book Ukrainian Folk Tales (1920)

The Flying Ship (Ukrainian: «Летючий корабель», romanized: Letiuchyi korabel; Russian: «Летучий корабль», romanized: Letuchiy korabl) is an East Slavic or Eastern European folk tale, considered a Ukrainian folk tale in some collections, as well as a Russian folk tale in others. In retellings, it is also called The Ship That Flew, Fool of the World and the Flying Ship, and The Fool and the Flying Ship.

== Plot ==
An old man and old woman had three sons, two wise and one foolish. The two wise sons were treated better than the foolish son. When the tsar offered his daughter in marriage for any man who could make a ship fly, the two wise sons were allowed to leave while the foolish son was not. Undeterred, the foolish son convinced his parents to let him go, and they sent him away with a small amount of stale, flavorless food and some water. On his way, he met an old man. When the old man asked for food, the foolish son opened his sack and was surprised to discover that it was no longer stale and flavorless. The foolish son next discovered that the water turned to wine after he had offered it to the old man. The old man thanked the foolish son for the food and drink, then tells him how the foolish son can go into the forest, chop a tree down, and then lay down and go to sleep until woken up. The foolish son does as suggested, and awakes to discover a flying ship, into which he climbs and flies off.

While flying, the foolish son meets a number of people. While the characters are similar, their names differ by storyteller.

- First, he sees a man with his ear to the ground. The foolish son asked the man (the listener) what he was doing, to which the man answered that he has incredible hearing and was listening to find out whether people had gathered for the tsar's feast. The foolish son offers to take the man there, and the man agrees and boards the ship.
- The foolish son next finds a man hopping on one foot (the runner) who says that when he unties his other foot, he steps over the whole world. The foolish son offers the runner a ride to the tsar's feast, to which the runner agrees.
- Next, the foolish son encounters an archer with incredible eyesight, who also accepts a ride on the flying ship.
- They next encounter a ravenous man with an incredible appetite (the gobbler) who also agrees to accept a ride.
- Next, they encounter a man with incredible thirst (the guzzler) who accepts a ride.
- Next, they encounter a man who can make snow from straw (the snowmaker) who also accepts a ride.
- Then, they encounter a wood-carrier with magic wood that can transform into a regiment of soldiers.

Finally, they arrive at the Tsar's feast and disembark from the flying ship. Viewing them as peasants, the tsar decides to give them five impossible tasks to avoid marrying his daughter to them.

- First, the Tsar threatens to kill the foolish son unless he can bring life-giving water. The listener heard the threat, and told the foolish son. The runner then went to gather the life-giving water, but when he did not return, the listener heard that he had fallen asleep. The archer then woke the runner with an arrow, and immediately the runner returned.
- Again threatening death, the Tsar came up with another task, that the foolish son and his friends must eat an incredible amount, which was then accomplished by the gobbler.
- Still threatening death, the Tsar presented another task, to drink an incredible amount of wine, which was then accomplished by the guzzler.
- Still seeking to get out of his promise, the Tsar summoned the foolish son to a bathhouse that had been made deadly hot. The snowmaker made it cold, and the foolish son survived.
- Finally, the Tsar demanded the foolish son to produce a regiment of soldiers, or again face death. The wood-carrier then used his magic wood to create a regiment of soldiers. The foolish son, also transformed, was no longer dressed in ragged clothes, but now an impressive uniform and riding on a horse.

Seeing this, the Tsar and his daughter were both satisfied.

== Analysis ==
=== Tale type ===
The tale is classified, in the East Slavic Folktale Classification (Russian: СУС, romanized: SUS), as two tale types: SUS 513A, Russian: Шесть чудесных товарищей, romanized: Shest' chudesnykh tovarishchey, lit. 'Six Wonderful Companions', and SUS 513B, Russian: Летучий корабль, romanized: Letuchiy korabl', lit. 'Flying Ship'. In type SUS 513A, the hero finds companions with wonderful powers that help him win a princess. In type SUS 513B, the hero carves a ship that traverses both in land and sea.

== Adaptations ==
=== Books ===
- Andrew Lang retold the Flying Ship in the 1894 The Yellow Fairy Book.
- Arthur Ransome retold the Flying Ship in the 1916 Old Peter's Russian Tales.
- Uri Shulevitz illustrated a version of the Flying Ship referencing Arthur Ransome's retelling and entitled it, The Fool of the World and the Flying Ship, which won the Caldecott Medal in 1969.

=== Film and audio productions ===
- A Soviet animated cartoon film The Flying Ship was released in 1979.
- A stop motion-animated film, Fool of the World and the Flying Ship, was made for television and released in the United Kingdom in 1990.
- The Fool and the Flying Ship was aired as part of the children's television series, Long Ago and Far Away.
- Retitled The Fool and the Flying Ship, Rabbit Ears Productions produced an audio performance featuring Robin Williams with music by the Klezmer Conservatory Band, which was released on Showtime in 1991.
- The Adventures of Baron Munchausen (1988) written and directed by Terry Gilliam, via the 1785 book by Rudolf Erich Raspe of similar name. By the characters, their superpowers and tasks, it seems Munchausen is a Bavarian re-telling of the Slavic folktale.

== See also ==
- The Fool of the World and the Flying Ship (book)
- The Fool of the World and the Flying Ship (1990 film)
- The Fool and the Flying Ship (audio performance)
- "How Six Made Their Way in the World"
- "Long, Broad and Sharpsight"
- "The Six Servants"
- ”The Golden Goose”
- Ukrainian fairy tale
- Russian fairy tale
