= Hankus Netsky =

American musician and ethnomusicologist

- Born: 1955 (age 70–71); Philadelphia, Pennsylvania, United States
- Known for: Founder and director of the Klezmer Conservatory Band Chair, Contemporary Improvisation Department, NEC
- Awards: New England Conservatory Outstanding Alumni Award; Yosl Mlotek Award for Yiddish culture; Louis Krasner Award (NEC, teaching); Lawrence Lesser Award (NEC, teaching)

Academic background
- Education: New England Conservatory (B.A., M.A. in Composition); Wesleyan University (Ph.D. in Ethnomusicology)

Academic work
- Institutions: New England Conservatory
- Notable works: Film scores, musicals, and klezmer arrangements

Hankus Netsky (b. Philadelphia, Pennsylvania, United States, 1955) is an American multi-instrumentalist, composer, and ethnomusicologist. He chairs the Contemporary Improvisation Department at the New England Conservatory. Netsky is founder and director of the Klezmer Conservatory Band, an internationally renowned Yiddish music ensemble, and serves as research director of the Klezmer Conservatory Foundation, a non-profit organization dedicated to the preservation and perpetuation of traditional Eastern European Jewish music. He plays the piano, accordion, and saxophone.

== Education ==
Netsky holds a Ph.D. in Ethnomusicology from Wesleyan University and bachelor's and master's degrees in composition from New England Conservatory.

== Career ==
He has taught Yiddish music and language at Hebrew College, the New England Conservatory, Hampshire College and Wesleyan University, and has lectured extensively on the subject in the US, Canada, and Europe. He has also designed numerous Yiddish culture exhibits for the Yiddish Book Center, where he served as Vice President for Education. His essays on klezmer music have been published by the University of California Press, the University of Pennsylvania Press, the University of Scranton Press, the University Press of America, and Hips Road.

He is currently an instructor in jazz and contemporary improvisation at the New England Conservatory in Boston.

He is musical director for Eternal Echoes, violinist Itzhak Perlman's Sony recording and international touring project featuring cantor Yitzkhak Meir Helfgot, and In The Fiddler's House, a klezmer music video, recording, and touring project.

He served as musical director and arranger for Joel Grey's Borshtcapades ’94, and was artistic director for A Taste of Passover and A Taste of Chanukah, PBS and PRI concert productions that featured Theodore Bikel, recorded live at New England Conservatory and broadcast nationally.

He was a consultant, arranger, and featured performer on To Life! America Celebrates Israel's 50th, broadcast internationally by CBS. In December 2002, he conducted the Atlanta Symphony Orchestra in a special holiday program also featuring the Klezmer Conservatory Band. He has produced numerous recordings, including ten by the Klezmer Conservatory Band.

== Honors and awards ==
He has been the recipient of the New England Conservatory's outstanding alumni award and the Yosl Mlotek Award for the perpetuation of Yiddish culture, and was honored twice by New England Conservatory for excellence in teaching with the Louis Krasner and Lawrence Lesser awards.

== Compositions ==
His film scores include, Theo Bikel: In the Shoes of Sholom Aleichem (2013), The Fool and the Flying Ship (1991), a Rabbit Ears children's video narrated by Robin Williams, The Forward: From Immigrants to Americans (1989), and The Double Burden: Three Generations of Working Women (1992). He adapted and composed the scores to the musicals Shlemiel the First (1994) (for the American Repertory Theatre) and King of the Schnorrers (2013), and composed the incidental music for the NPR radio series, Jewish Stories From Eastern Europe and Beyond.

His other significant compositions include The Trees Of The Dancing Goats, for Rabbit Ears Radio (PRI), and Chagall's Mandolins, commissioned by the Niew Sinfonietta of Amsterdam.
