= Adagio in G minor =

1958 musical work by Remo Giazotto

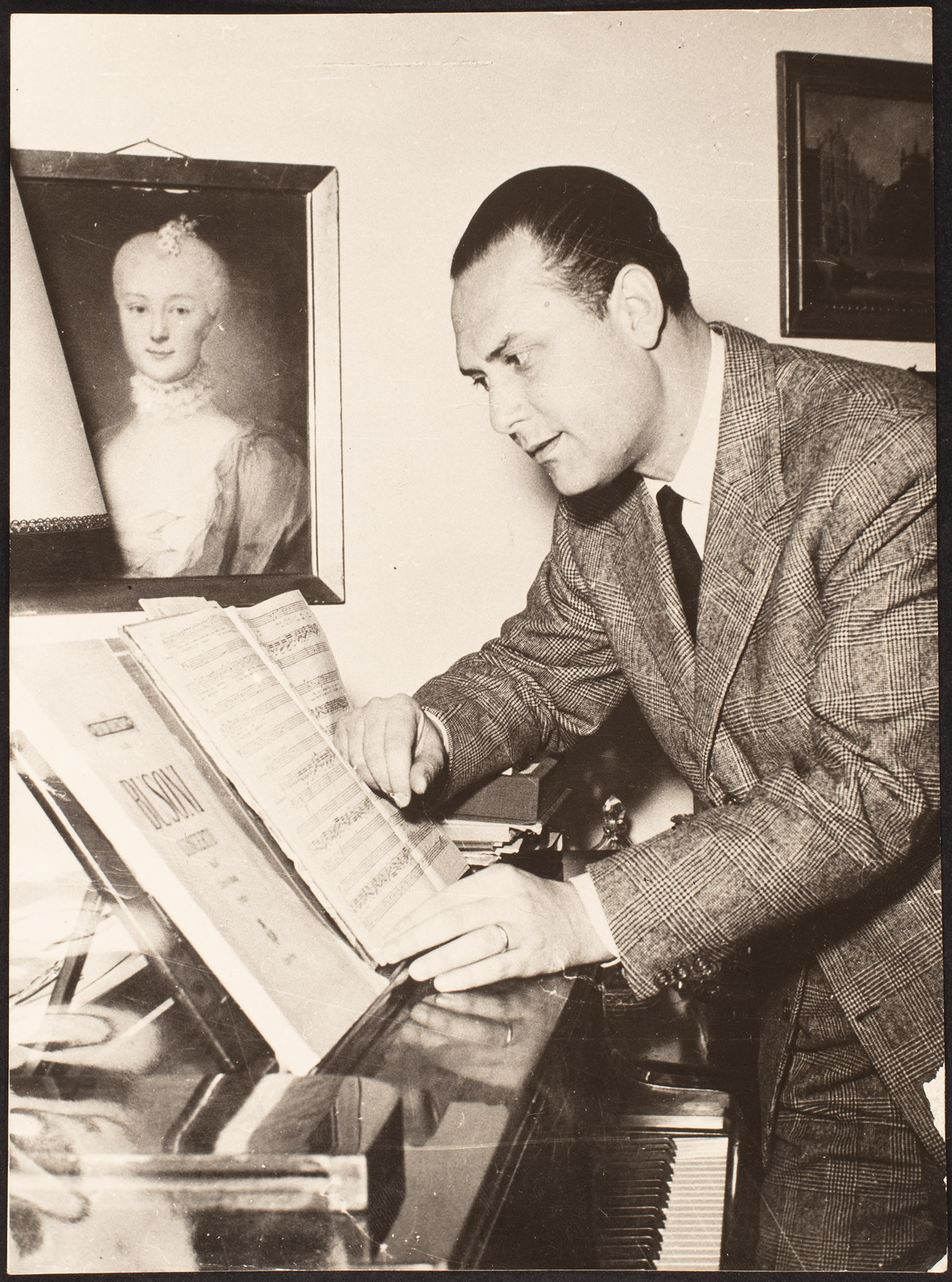
Remo Giazotto in 1950

Adagio in Sol minore per archi e organo su due spunti tematici e su un basso numerato di Tomaso Albinoni (Mi 26) (Adagio in G minor for strings and organ, on two thematic ideas and a figured bass by Tomaso Albinoni), also known as "Albinoni's Adagio", is a 1958 neo-Baroque composition often misattributed to the 18th-century Venetian composer Tomaso Albinoni. In fact, the work was composed by a 20th-century musicologist and Albinoni biographer named Remo Giazotto. The piece was purportedly based on the discovery of a bass line by Albinoni in a manuscript fragment.

Scholarly debate over the existence of the fragment persists, with some seeing the affair as a musical hoax perpetrated by Giazotto. There is no room for doubt when it comes to the source of everything in the Adagio other than the bassline, and Giazotto's authorship of these parts is not disputed.

== Provenance ==
The composition is often referred to as "Albinoni's Adagio" or "Adagio in G minor by Albinoni, arranged by Giazotto". The ascription to Albinoni rests upon Giazotto's purported discovery of a manuscript fragment (consisting of a few opening measures of the melody line and basso continuo portion) from a slow second movement of an otherwise unknown Albinoni trio sonata.

According to Giazotto, he obtained the document shortly after the end of World War II from the Saxon State Library in Dresden which had preserved most of its collection, although its buildings were destroyed in the bombing raids of February and March 1945 by the British and American Air Forces. Giazotto concluded that the manuscript fragment was a portion of a church sonata (sonata da chiesa, one of two standard forms of the trio sonata) in G minor composed by Albinoni, possibly as part of his Op. 4 set, around 1708.

In his account, Giazotto then constructed the balance of the complete single-movement work based on this fragmentary theme. He copyrighted it and published it in 1958 under a title which, translated into English, reads "Adagio in G minor for strings and organ, on two thematic ideas and on a figured bass by Tomaso Albinoni". Giazotto never produced the manuscript fragment, and no official record has been found of its presence in the collection of the Saxon State Library.

The piece is most commonly orchestrated for string ensemble and organ, or string ensemble alone, but with its growing fame has been transcribed for other instruments.

== In popular culture ==
The Adagio has been used in many films, television programmes, advertisements, recordings, and books. Notable occurrences include:

- In the 1962 Orson Welles film The Trial
- In the 1968 West German short film Die Geschäftsfreunde (The Deadly Companions) by Martin Müller, a filmmaker originally associated with the so-called New Munich Group and subsequently sound engineer for many Wim Wenders' films.
- In 1974, in Werner Herzog's film, The Enigma of Kaspar Hauser
- For Renaissance's 1974 album Turn of the Cards on the track "Cold Is Being"
- In the original 1975 version of the film Rollerball
- In the 1975 episode "Dragon's Domain" of Space 1999
- For The Doors' 1978 album An American Prayer on the track "A Feast of Friends". The backing track was recorded in 1968 during the sessions for Waiting for the Sun.
- In Butterflies, a UK sitcom 1978–1983
- In the 1978 short film, Emma Zunz starring Virginia Rambal
- In Richard Clayderman's 1979 recording "Sentimental Medley" for his album Medley Concerto; interspersed with Rossini's Il Barbiere di Siviglia overture and Bach/Gounod's "Ave Maria", along with two guitar/percussion solo interludes.
- In the 1980 episode 153 (神様のくれた札束) of Lupin the 3rd Part II
- In the 1981 Peter Weir film Gallipoli
- In the 1983 film Flashdance
- Yngwie Malmsteen, in "Icarus Dream Suite Op. 4" (1984)
- In the 1991 film The Doors in the scene at Père Lachaise Cemetery.
- In the 1995 computer game Rise of the Triad
- In the 1998 song "Anytime, Anywhere" from the album Eden by Sarah Brightman
- In the 1998 computer game Might and Magic VI: The Mandate of Heaven
- A 1999 crossover song in English and Italian, "Adagio", by Lara Fabian
- A 2000 stop-motion animated film "Adagio" by Garri Bardin
- In season 3 of The Sopranos (2001), it is used as background music of the funeral of Livia Soprano.
- In 2003 Rollerball – Albinoni - trance tracks
- For Tiësto's 2004 song "Athena" performed live at the 2004 Summer Olympics opening ceremony and featured in the album Parade of the Athletes
- The 2005 episode of Malcolm in the Middle entitled "Ida's Dance"
- In the 2016 film Manchester by the Sea by Kenneth Lonergan
- Wolf Hoffmann recorded a neo-classical metal version, released in his Headbangers Symphony album (2016).
- In the 2018 series The Assassination of Gianni Versace: American Crime Story
- The background music for the "Confessions" feature on Simon Mayo's radio show since the 1990s
- Musical interlude in Miley Cyrus's "Every Girl You've Ever Loved", released in 2025 as track 11 on her Something Beautiful album.
