= The Flying Ship (animated film) =

- Directed by: Garri Bardin
- Written by: Aleksey Simukov
- Produced by: Lyubov Butyrina
- Starring: Tatyana Shabelnikova; Mikhail Boyarsky
- Cinematography: Kabul Rasulov
- Edited by: Margarita Mikheeva
- Music by: Maksim Dunayevsky
- Production company: Soyuzmultfilm
- Release date: December 25, 1979
- Running time: 18 min.
- Country: Soviet Union
- Language: Russian

The Flying Ship (Russian: Летучий корабль, romanized: Letuchiy korabl) is a Soviet musical cartoon film directed by Garri Bardin in 1979 based on the Eastern European folk tale of the same name.

The cartoon features songs by Yuri Entin to the music of Maksim Dunayevsky. In 2024, a remake with the same title was released.

== Plot ==
The Tsar wants to marry his daughter Princess Zabava to his rich boyar Polkan. But Zabava does not want to marry Polkan, because he is ugly and evil, and she does not love him, and he does not love her. Polkan only needs the tsar's personal connections to increase his wealth and the status of heir to the throne.

A simple chimney sweep, Vanya, falls in love with Zabava. The love turns out to be mutual. Zabava asks Vanya how he will rescue her. He proposes to build a flying ship. Zabava tells the king that she will only marry the one who builds a flying ship. The Tsar asks Polkan if he will build it, to which he replies that he will buy it.

The heroes take turns singing about their dreams, from which it is clear that the dreams of the Tsar and Polkan are diametrically different from what Zabava dreams of, but the dreams of the main character and his beloved coincide. Ivan meets Vodyanoy, who sings about his joyless life. The latter helps Vanya build a flying ship by giving him the tools. They turned out to be magical because they will do everything themselves if you manage to hold them.

Polkan tells the king that he built the flying ship, and now Zabava will be his wife. The king echoes that the ship belongs to him, climbs the stairs to the ship, but, having uttered the first half of the spell known to him, hangs in the air and can neither fly nor descend to the ground. Zabava flatly refuses to open the door to Polkan.

Ivan and Zabava have already escaped. Through the pipe, the lovers leave the palace and climb up the stairs, which Polkan forgot to remove, onto the ship. Polkan managed to climb onto the ladder, but Ivan says, “Good luck!”

The ship flies away, but Polkan does not have time to climb on and falls from a great height. Ivan and Zabava fly away on the ship.

== Voice cast ==
- Tatyana Shabelnikova as Princess Zabava
- Mikhail Boyarsky as Vanya
- Garri Bardin as Tsar
- Rogvold Sukhoverko as Polkan (songs performed by Mark Aizikovich)
- Anatoly Papanov as Vodyanoy

== See also ==
- Flying Ship (folk tale)
- The Fool of the World and the Flying Ship
- Zabava
