= The Fool of the World and the Flying Ship =

British film based on Eastern European folk tale

- Written by: John Hambley (adaptation)
- Directed by: Francis Vose
- Starring: Robin Bailey; Maurice Denham; Jimmy Hibbert; Martin Jarvis; Edward Kelsey; Miriam Margolyes; Alan Rothwell; Barbara Wilshere; John Woodvine
- Narrated by: David Suchet
- Music by: Mike Harding
- Country of origin: United Kingdom
- Original language: English

Production
- Producer: Chris Taylor
- Running time: 60 minutes
- Production companies: Cosgrove Hall Films; WGBH Boston

Original release
- Release: 27 December 1990

The Fool of the World and the Flying Ship is a made-for-television stop motion-animated film released in the United Kingdom on 27 December 1990 on ITV, based on the Eastern European folk tale. It was co-produced with WGBH Boston for broadcast on Long Ago and Far Away. The Fool of the World and the Flying Ship was released on DVD in the United Kingdom.

== Synopsis ==
In the kingdom of Russia, its ruler Tsar Nicolai finds his daughter, Princess Alexeya, is unwilling to marry any suitors presented to her, despite their gifts to her father. One day, to his surprise, she declares she will only marry a man if they can bring her father a ship that can fly, which the Czar joyfully agrees to. Word of this proposal is spread across the kingdom, which presents an opportunity to two young men - Sergei and Boris - to convince their father, a poor woodsman, and their mother, to finance their journey to honor this request. Once the pair are given supplies and money, they greedily waste it on themselves.

Concerned for his brothers welfare after their departure, their young brother Pieter decides to follow after them, and is given what little his parents can afford to give him. Whilst journeying through the forest, Pieter encounters an old man who asks if he has food to spare, which he offers despite having been given little. To his surprise, the old man declares he is well provided, as the bag contains more food than his parents gave. Feasting on the meal with him, Pieter eventually falls asleep. To reward his kindness, the old man forms a flying ship out of snow and ice, along with the feathers of a snowbird.

When Pieter awakens, he finds himself on the ship, which takes off and flies through the air towards Nicolai's palace. Along the way, he stops the ship to offer a ride to several people wishing to see the Tsar, abiding by a rule from the old man not to refuse them passage. These include Sharpshooter, an archer with keen eyesight; Farmer, who collects rare straw that is cold to the touch; Lightning, a man who can run fast and must have one leg tied up as a result; Listener, a man with ears capable of hearing hundreds of miles away; and Forester, a woodsman whose saplings grow quickly, and his wife Mrs. Forester.

Upon their arrival, the Lord Chamberlain, Nicolai's advisor, presumes them to be thieves and convinces the Tsar to have them tested harshly. The group soon find themselves instructed to consume a large banquet, leaving no scraps and leftovers. Mrs. Forester delights in this, eating everything, much to the surprise of the others. Annoyed at their success, the Lord Chamberlain feigns goodwill to the group and offers to let them bathe in the Tsar's bath house, but secretly orders the workers to lock them in and boil them alive. Farmer, who avoids being trapped inside, uses his straw to save the lives of the others.

The next day, whilst awaiting a new task, Alexeya disguises herself as a servant to meet Pieter, who falls in love with her. Eventually, the Lord Chamberlain challenges the group to bring back a bottle of silver-water from a lake far away, with Pieter instructed to place it in Nicolai's hand by noon, giving the party only five minutes. Lightning agrees to get the water, but falls asleep, prompting Listener and Sharpshooter to awaken him before time is up. Pieter manages to complete the task, but foolishly believes Alexeya is a servant, not the Tsar's daughter. Insulted, Nicolai has him imprisoned, and his friends banished from the palace.

Determined to rescue Pieter, Forester instructs the others to plant his saplings around the Tsar's palace that night which quickly grows into a vast army. Upon seeing this in the morning, a worried Nicolai finds himself approached by Sharpshooter and the others, who demands Pieter be released and married to Alexeya, and that all of them are allowed to serve the Tsar. Through Alexeya's encouragement, the Tsar agrees, who punishes the Lord Chamberlain for his cruelty to the others. Following their wedding, Nicolai prepares to enjoy his new flying ship, only for Pieter and Alexeya to smile as the old man arrives to fly off with it.

== See also ==
=== Original folk tale ===
- Flying Ship

=== Other adaptations ===
- Andrew Lang included it in The Yellow Fairy Book and Arthur Ransome in Old Peter's Russian Tales.
- Uri Shulevitz illustrated a version of Ransome's tale in The Fool of the World and the Flying Ship, for which he won the Caldecott Medal in 1969. It aired as part of WGBH's children's series Long Ago and Far Away.
- Rabbit Ears Productions produced an audiotape version, featuring Robin Williams with music by the Klezmer Conservatory Band, which was released on Showtime in 1991. It aired as part of Rabbit Ears' series We All Have Tales.
- The Terry Gilliam film The Adventures of Baron Munchausen (1988) contains several elements inspired by this story, particularly the opening sequence set at the court of the Grand Turk.

=== Other folk tales ===
- The Six Servants
- How Six Made Their Way in the World
- How the Hermit Helped to Win the King's Daughter
- Long, Broad and Sharpsight
- The King of Lochlin's Three Daughters
- The Griffin
- The Golden Goose
- Askeladden

=== Other films ===
- List of animated films
- List of stop motion films
