= Snow (picture book) =

1999 children's picture book by Uri Shulevitz

- Author: Uri Shulevitz
- Illustrator: Uri Shulevitz
- Cover artist: Uri Shulevitz
- Language: English
- Genre: children's books picture books
- Publisher: Farrar, Straus and Giroux
- Publication date: 1998
- Publication place: United States
- Media type: Print
- Pages: 32
- ISBN: 9780374370923
- OCLC: 37594582

Snow is a children's picture book by Uri Shulevitz. It received a Caldecott Honor in 1999. It also won the Charlotte Zolotow Award in 1999.

== Description ==
This book uses lively watercolor and pen-and-ink illustrations to show the transformation of the city as snow falls. The beginning pages use a dull and bleak palette. By the end of the book the previously dull city is covered in snow and looks magical and bright.

== Plot ==
It is a dull and grey city until the first snowflakes start to fall. No one thinks those few flakes will amount to much except for a boy and his dog. He believes that it will snow, despite the numerous predictions from adults, the television, and the radio that it will not. As the snow begins to pile up, disgruntled adults rush home, leaving the boy and his dog to joyfully enjoy the snow.

== Themes ==
The snow is a metaphor for "the faith young children possess in the face of an adult world lacking in vision and understanding."
