= Ilchester Lectures =

The Ilchester Lectures is a series of academic lectures in the University of Oxford, England, founded by William Fox-Strangways, 4th Earl of Ilchester (1795–1865).

== History ==
Lord Ilchester was a diplomat representing Great Britain and Ireland and later a Whig politician. He served as Under-Secretary of State for Foreign Affairs under Lord Melbourne from 1835 to 1840 and then was Minister Plenipotentiary to the German Confederation from 1840 to 1849. On his death in 1865 he left a bequest for the founding of a series of lectures in Slavonic studies, the first of which was given in 1870.

== List of lecturers since 1870 ==
- 1870: W. R. Morfill
- 1874: William Ralston Shedden Ralston, published as Early Russian History
- 1876: Vilhelm Thomsen, published as The Relations Between Ancient Russia and Scandinavia, and the Origin of the Russian State
- 1877: Albert Henry Wratislaw, published as The Native Literature of Bohemia in the Fourteenth Century
- 1883: Carl Abel, published as Slavic and Latin. Ilchester Lectures on comparative lexicography
- 1884: Arthur Evans, six lectures on the Slavonic conquest of Illyricum (unpublished)
- 1886: Moses Gaster, published as Ilchester Lectures on Greeko-Slavonic literature (1887)
- 1889–1890: Maxime Kovalevsky, published as Modern Customs and Ancient Laws of Russia: Being the Ilchester Lectures for 1889-1890
- 1900: Fedor Zigel, published as Lectures on Slavonic law: being the Ilchester lectures for the year 1900
- 1904: Count Lützow, published as Lectures on the Historians of Bohemia: Being the Ilchester Lectures for the Year 1904
- 1923: Roman Dyboski, published as Periods of Polish literary history, being the Ilchester lectures for the year 1923
- 1937: David Talbot Rice, published as The Beginnings of Russian Icon Painting
