= Seryi Volk & Krasnaya Shapochka =

Seryi Volk & Krasnaya Shapochka, (Grey Wolf and Little Red Riding Hood / Серый Волк энд Красная Шапочка) is a claymation film, produced in the USSR by Garri Bardin in 1990, a year before the USSR actually did break up. The film is considered a parody of the demise of the USSR blended into the children's story of "Little Red Riding Hood".

== Summary ==
The Grey Wolf swallows up people from all walks of life, even though they have done nothing against him and even a doctor who fixed a set of teeth for him, against his better judgement as the wolf was forced by the authorities to lose his original set of teeth for previous undisclosed trouble.

Eventually everyone inside him break free after doing their best to keep feeling happy and calm, led by the elderly grandmother of whom the wolf must have assumed would have been the weakest and least likely to start a revolt.

The wolf (who is still alive), tries to make one last attempt to salvage his freedom and fearful reputation by approaching the doctor to fix his teeth again, only for him to hit the wolf with a peace protest sign and then a trio of huntsmen shackle him to it. The mob then march off leaving the wolf behind, chained up.

All this started over the wolf's attempts to eat the pie made by Little Red Riding Hood's mother for her daughter to take to her grandmother in Paris, France, all the way, on her own from Moscow, Soviet Union (now Russia).

== Soundtrack ==
This film can be considered as a musical, as most of the words are sung.

A few common tunes are used to form part of the musical score used for in the film soundtrack, such as "Mack the Knife" and the "Tea for Two Cha-Cha" (both American tunes) as well as "La Vie En Rose", which was made famous by "Édith Piaf". The final song is loosely based on "Auld Lang Syne".

== See also ==
- Kurt Weill - the original songwriter of "Mack the Knife"
- The Cold War
- KGB
