= The Fool of the World and the Flying Ship (book) =

Caldecott Medal 1968 picture book illustrated by Uri Shulevitz

- The Fool of the World and the Flying Ship
- Author: Arthur Ransome
- Illustrator: Uri Shulevitz
- Genre: Children's picture book
- Publisher: Farrar, Straus and Giroux
- Publication date: 1968
- Publication place: United States
- Pages: 48
- ISBN: 0-374-42438-1
- OCLC: 50144962

The Fool of the World and the Flying Ship is a children's picturebook illustrated by Uri Shulevitz that retells an Eastern European fairy tale of the same name. The text is taken from Arthur Ransome's version of the story in the 1916 book Old Peter's Russian Tales; Ransome had collected the folktale when he was a journalist in the Russian Empire. The book was released in 1968 by Farrar, Straus and Giroux and won a Caldecott Medal for illustration in 1969.

== Plot summary ==
The Czar has announced that whoever can bring him a flying ship can marry his daughter. The Fool of the World, the youngest son of a peasant couple, sets out to marry the Princess. His mother gives him "some crusts of dry black bread and a flask of water" in a bag for his trip.

The Fool meets an "ancient old man" who asks to eat the Fool's food. When the Fool opens his bag, he is surprised to find "fresh white rolls and cooked meats," as well as "corn brandy," which he shares. The old man instructs the Fool to hit a tree with his hatchet to create a flying ship, but advises him to give a ride to everyone he meets.

After making and flying his ship, the Fool picks up the Listener (who can hear very faint sounds), the Swift-goer (who can walk across the world in one step), the Far-shooter (who can hit a bird hundreds of miles away), the Eater (who can consume great quantities of food), the Drinker (who can swallow more than a lake at one time), a man carrying sticks of wood that can become soldiers, and a man carrying straw that can make everything cold.

The eight men land at the Czar's palace. Although the Czar wants the ship, he does not want the Princess to marry a moujik (peasant). So the Czar gives five supposedly impossible tasks to the Fool and his men:

- Before the Czar has finished his dinner, he wants "the magical water of life." In response, the Swift-goer runs to find the water, but falls asleep. After the Listener locates the Swift-goer, the Far-shooter shoots a bullet close to the Swift-goer's head, waking him up. The Swift-goer returns with a bottle of the water.
- The Czar requires the men to eat "twelve oxen roasted whole, and as much bread as can be baked in forty ovens." The Eater considers the food "a little snack."
- The Czar commands the men to drink 40 barrels of wine, which the Drinker gulps quickly.
- The Czar demands that the Fool take a bath in a hot iron bathhouse to prepare for the wedding, planning to boil him to death. The man with the straw accompanies the Fool and spreads his straw, causing the bath water to freeze.
- The Czar states that he wants the Fool to show him "a regiment of soldiers" to defend the Princess. The man with the wood sticks scatters them around, causing a "gigantic army" to appear.

Having failed in his quest to get rid of the peasants, the Czar gives the Fool gifts and asks him to marry the Princess. The Fool and the Princess fall in love with each other and are married, and the Fool "became so clever that all the court repeated everything he said."

== Reception ==
In 1968 the book was selected for Fanfare, the Horn Book Magazine list of the best books of the year. It won a Caldecott Medal in 1969.

Shulevitz's illustrations for the story were praised as "colorful, bold, spirited, and spontaneous." However, the text has been criticized because the lead character has mental retardation that is "unrealistic" in that "he is magically cured from his simple mindedness and becomes highly respected by the people."

== See also ==
- Flying ship (folk tale)
- The Fool of the World and the Flying Ship (1990 film)

== Selected translations ==
- Tontimundo y el Barco Volador: un Cuento Ruso (Spanish, 1991, ISBN 0374324433)
- Soratobu fune to sekai ichi no baka: Roshia no mukashibanashi Ruso (Japanese, 1991)
- Sesang e tul to ŏmnŭn pabo wa hanŭl ŭl nanŭn pae (Korean, 1997, ISBN 8972594644)
- L'Idiot du Village et le Vaisseau Volant: un Conte Russe (French, 2011, ISBN 9782362900112)

Awards
Preceded by Drummer Hoff	Caldecott Medal recipient 1969	Succeeded by Sylvester and the Magic Pebble
