= Garri Bardin =

Russian animation director (born 1941)

- Гарри Бардин
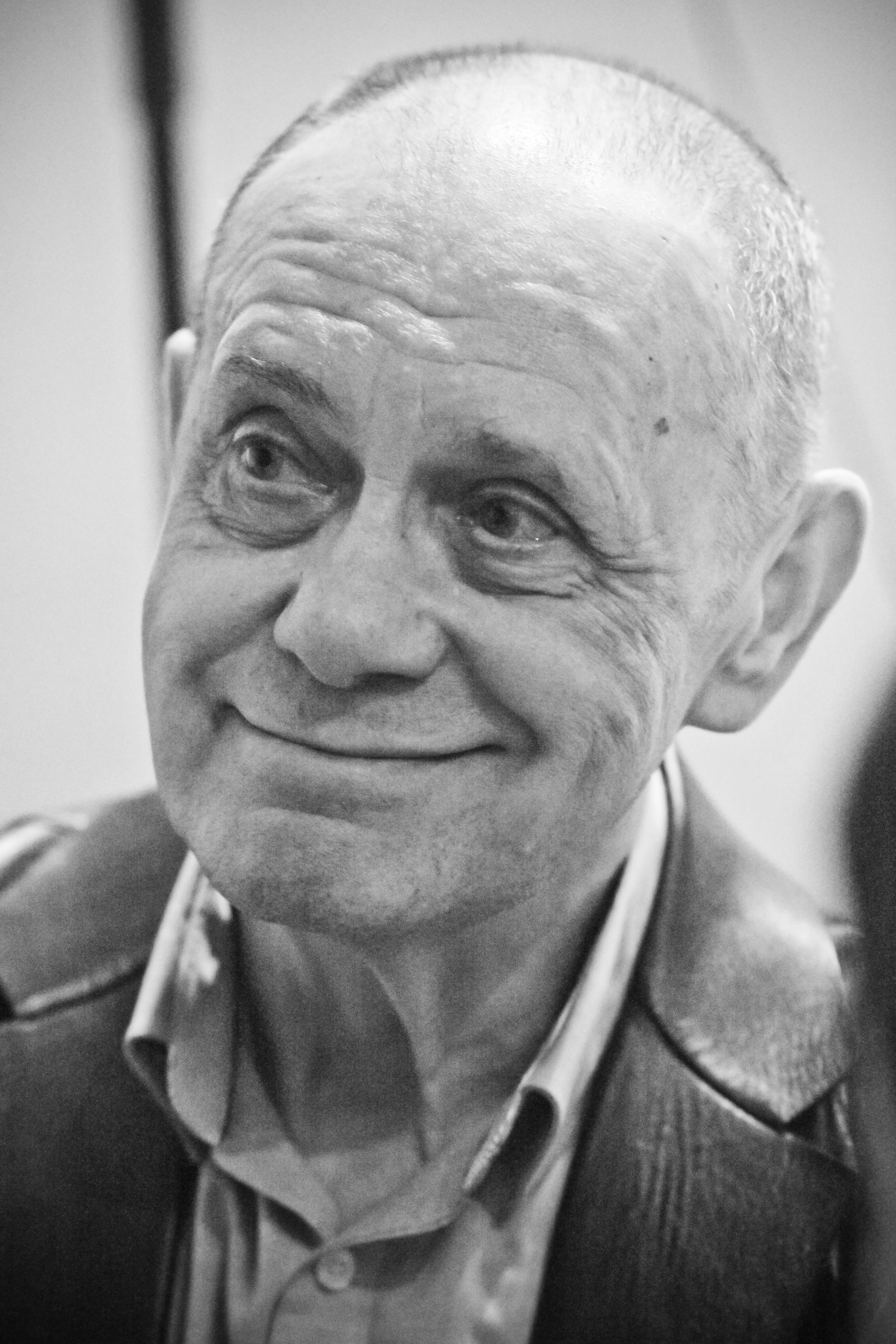
- Bardin in 2017
- Born: Garri Yakovlevich Bardenshtein; 11 September 1941 (age 84); Chkalov, RSFSR, Soviet Union
- Occupations: Animator, screenwriter, actor
- Years active: 1967–present
- Garri Bardin's voice Barandin's interview on the Echo of Moscow program, 5 August 2012

Garri Yakovlevich Bardin (Russian: Гарри Яковлевич Бардин; born September 11, 1941) is a Soviet and Russian animation director, screenwriter, producer and actor best known for his experimental musical and stop motion films. He was awarded the 1988 Short Film Palme d'Or for the Fioritures cartoon and the Order of Honour in 2011.

== Early life and education ==
Garri Bardin was born in 1941 as Garri Yakovlevich Bardenstein in Chkalov (modern-day Orenburg, Orenburg Oblast of Russia) where his pregnant mother Rozalia Abramovna Bardenshtein had been evacuated from Kyiv with the start of the Great Patriotic War. The family was Jewish. His father Yakov Lvovich Bardenshtein was a naval officer who joined marines in 1941 and took part in the Battle of Stalingrad. After World War II, the family moved to Liepāja, Latvian SSR where his father served at the Baltic Fleet.

Bardin spent three years in the Soviet Army, and in 1968, he finished the Actor's Faculty at the Moscow Art Theatre School.

== Career ==
Bardenstein joined the N. V. Gogol Moscow Drama Theatre (modern-day Gogol Center) where he served till 1973. The director asked him to shorten his surname which was too long for theatre posters, and he adapted the Bardin stage name. Upon leaving the theatre he spent some time writing stories, plays and TV screenplays. He had been also voicing cartoons since 1967.

Around the same time, he sent a screenplay to Soyuzmultfilm and was suggested to direct the cartoon himself despite his lack of formal training. From then on, he worked as an animation director. Among his first shorts was A Tincan segment from the Happy Merry-Go-Round No. 8 anthology series (1976). In 1979, he directed The Flying Ship, a traditionally animated musical film loosely based on the old Russian fairy tale The Fool of the World and the Flying Ship. The film and the songs by Yuri Entin in particular gained popularity. Bardin then worked on several other hand-drawn films along with Entin.

In 1983, he directed his first experimental stop motion cartoon for adults — Conflict, a Cold War allegory where two groups of matches enter a conflict which leads to a war. It was followed by several claymation comedy films, including Break!, a parody on a boxing match for which Bardin received a Golden Dove award at the 1986 Dok Leipzig. In 1987, he released two films: Marriage made of ropes and Fioritures made of aluminium wire for which he was awarded the 1988 Short Film Palme d'Or at the Cannes Film Festival.

In 1990, he directed his last Soyuzmultiflm cartoon — Grey Wolf and Little Red Riding Hood, a claymation musical film that satirized last days of the USSR. It was awarded a number of awards, including Grand Prix for the best short film at the 1991 Annecy International Animation Film Festival and the 1992 Nika Award for the best animated film. After that, Bardin founded and headed the Stayer animation studio where he continued directing claymation and stop motion films, as well as TV commercials. After six years in production, he finally released his first feature animated musical The Ugly Duckling (2010) loosely based on the Hans Christian Andersen's fairy tale of the same name, with a heavy influence of George Orwell's Animal Farm. It received mixed reviews from critics and failed at the box office, while central Russian TV channels refused to show it according to Bardin. At the same time, it gained a number of awards, including the 2011 Nika Award.

After The Ugly Duckling, Bardin used Planeta.ru to help crowdfund six more animated shorts, with a seventh on the way.

== Personal life ==
Bardin was married three times. The son from his third marriage Pavel Bardin (born 1975) is a Russian film director.

== Filmography ==
=== Animation ===
==== Director ====
- Touch the Sky (1975); also screenwriter
- Happy Merry-Go-Round (1976); episode 8, segment "A Tincan", also screenwriter
- Brave Inspector Mamochkin (1977); also co-screenwriter
- The Adventures of a Hamster (1978)
- The Flying Ship (1979)
- Bang! Bang! Oh-oh-oh! (1980)
- Road Tale (1981); also screenwriter
- We Used To Be Birds (1982); also co-screenwriter
- Conflict (1983); also screenwriter
- Wham and Bam, House Painters! (1984); also screenwriter
- Banquet (1986); also screenwriter
- Frills (1987); also screenwriter
- Marriage (1987); also screenwriter
- Grey Wolf and Little Red Riding Hood (1990); also screenwriter
- Puss in Boots (1995)
- Chucha (1997); also screenwriter and producer
- Adagio (2000); also screenwriter and producer
- Chucha-2 (2001); also screenwriter and producer
- Chucha-3 (2004); also screenwriter and producer
- The Ugly Duckling (2010); also screenwriter
- Three Melodies (2013); also screenwriter and producer
- Listening to Beethoven (2015); also screenwriter and producer
- Bolero 2017 (2017); also screenwriter and producer
- Sandbox (2020); also screenwriter and producer
- Ave Maria (2023); also screenwriter and producer
- Everlasting Lament (2024); also screenwriter and producer

==== Voice acting ====
- The Flying Ship (1979) as Tsar
- Baba Yaga is against! (1979–1980) as Koshchei the Deathless (uncredited)
- In the Blue Sea, in the White Foam (1984) as Sea Tsar
- Vykrutasy (1988) as Wire Man
- The Ugly Duckling (2010) as Narrator

=== Live action ===
- The Adventures of Buratino (1975) as Spiders in Malvina's pantry (voice)
- Practical Joke (1977) as French teacher
- Moscow Does Not Believe in Tears (1980) as chemical plant chief engineer

== Awards and honors ==
- Short Film Palme d'Or (1988) – for film Vykrutasy
- Nika Award for Best Animation Film (1992) – for film Seryi Volk & Krasnaya Shapochka
- Nika Award for Best Animation Film (1999) – for film Chucha
- State Prize of the Russian Federation (4 June 1999)
- Nika Award for Best Animation Film (2001) – for film Adagio
- Nika Award for Best Animation Film (2005) – for film Chucha-3
- Nika Award for Best Animation Film (2011) – for film The Ugly Duckling
- Order of Honour (13 October 2011)

== See also ==
- History of Russian animation
