= Dmitry Mitrokhin =

Russian artist and art historian (1883–1973)

Dmitry Mitrohin
- Дмитрий Митрохин
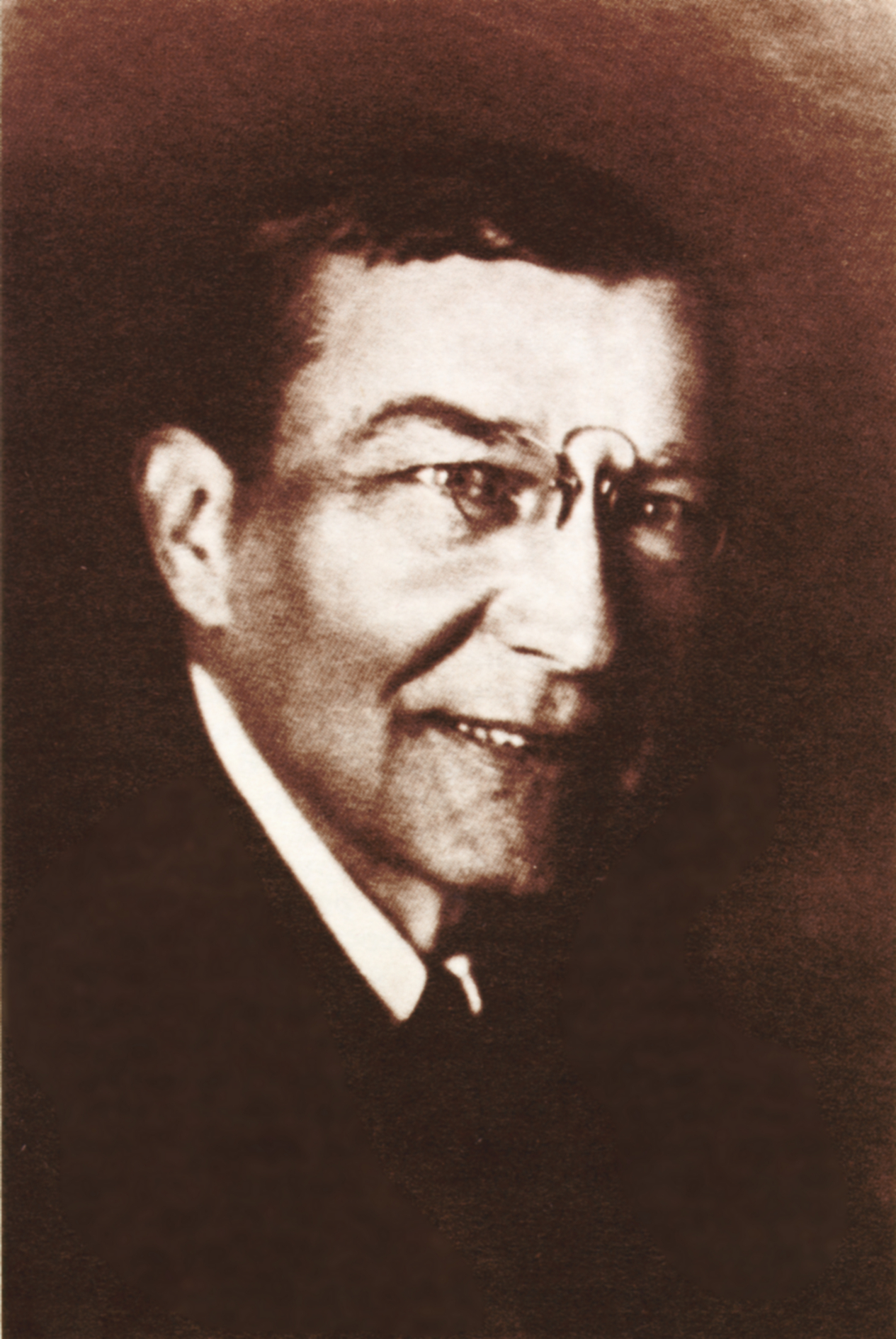
- Mitrohin in 1913
- Born: Dmitry Isidorovich Mitrohin; 15 May 1883; Yeysk, Krasnodar Krai, Russian Empire
- Died: 7 November 1973 (aged 90); Moscow, Soviet Russia
- Education: Moscow School of Painting, Sculpture and Architecture; Stroganov Art School
- Occupations: Artist, book illustrator, art historian

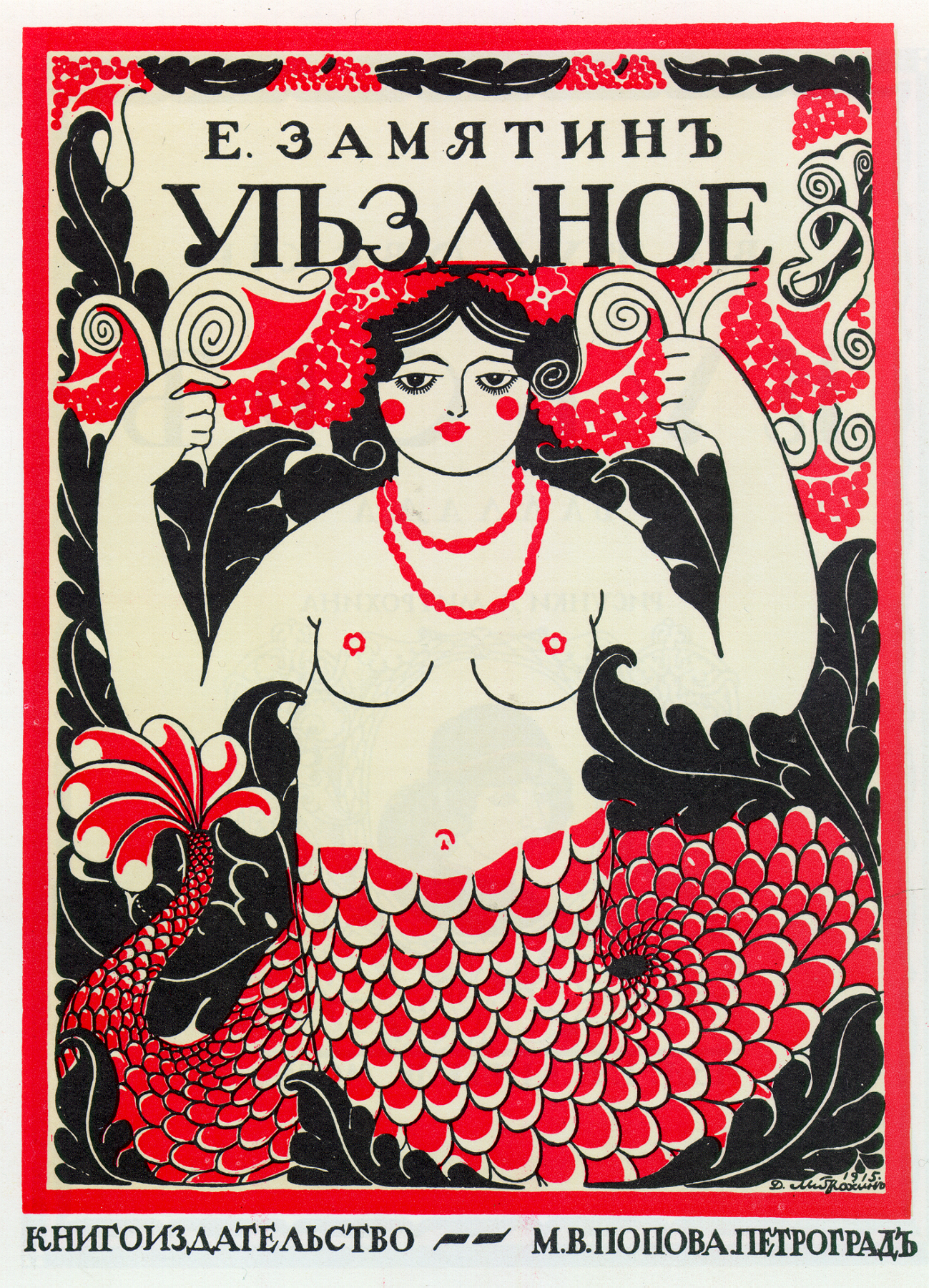
Cover of Yevgeny Zamyatin's book Uezdnoe, 1916

Dmitry Isidorovich Mitrohin, also Mitrokhin (Russian: Дмитрий Исидорович Митрохин; 15 May 1883 – 7 November 1973) was a Russian and Soviet graphic artist, illustrator, master of easel engraving, etching and lithography, author of many book illustrations, a huge cycle of miniatures in the genre chamber still life. Art critic, member of many art associations, Professor of the Higher Institute of photography and photographic technique (1919-1926), Professor of the Printing Department of the Higher Artistic and Technical Institute (1924-1930 a course in book graphics) in Leningrad. Honored Artist of the RSFSR (1969).

== Biography ==
He was born in Yeysk, Krasnodor Krai, Russia. In 1902, he joined the Moscow School of Painting, Sculpture and Architecture, and transferred to the Stroganov Art School in 1904 to study book illustration. In 1905, Mitrohin moved to Paris and attended drawing classes by Eugène Grasset and Théophile Steinlen. He returned to Russia in 1908, and settled in Saint Petersburgh between 1912 and 1914, illustrating children's books (including Arthur Ransome's Old Peter's Russian Tales) and other Russian books such as Lukomorie.

From 1919 to 1923, Dmitry Mitrohin was a custodian in the drawings and engravings department of the Russian Museum. In 1919, he also started teaching at the Higher Photography Institute, and then at the Academy of Arts from 1924 to 1934. In 1944, he moved back to Moscow to do book illustration until the 1960s. He died in Moscow in 1973.

== Work ==
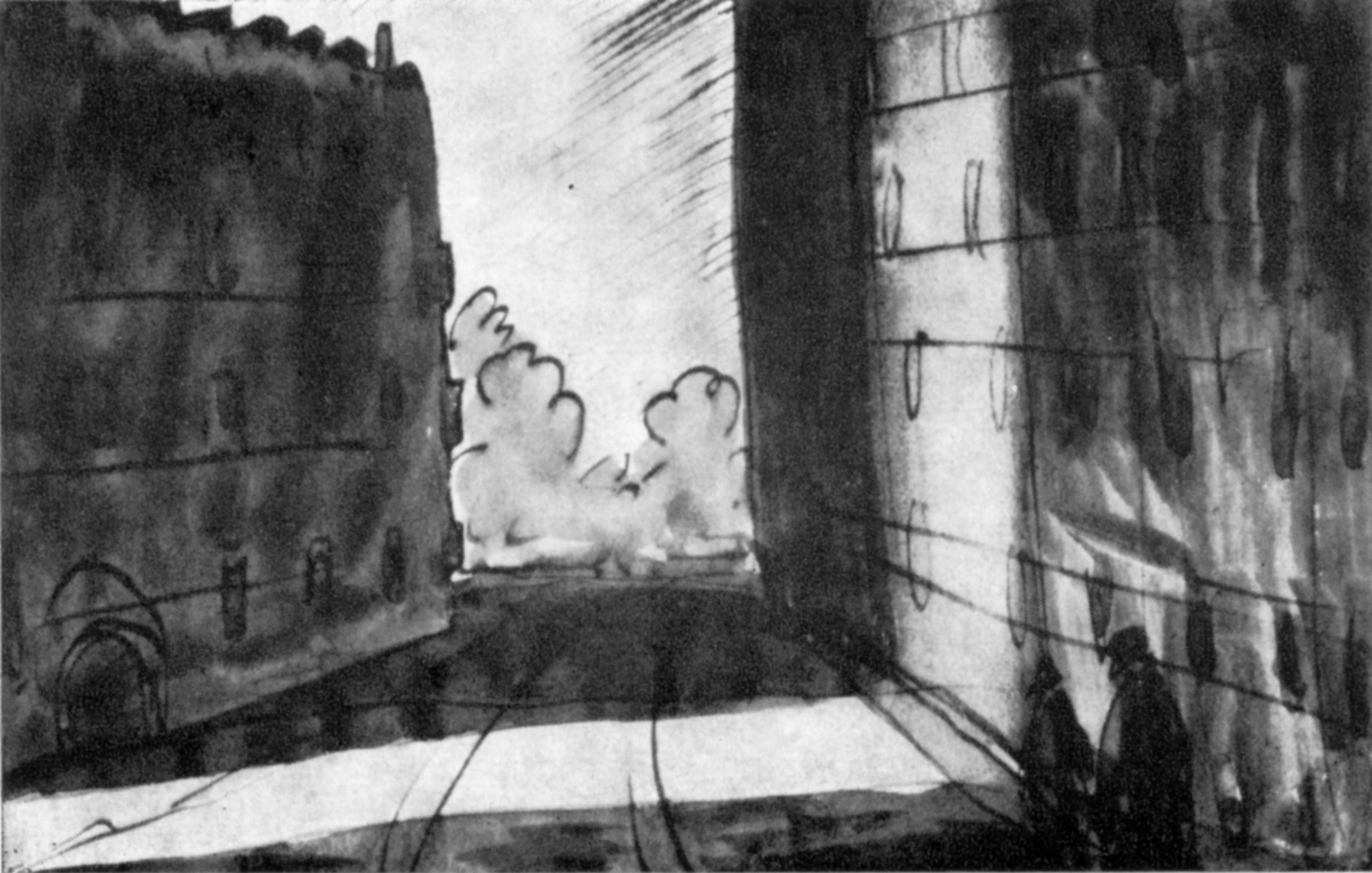
D.I.Mitrokhin. In old Petersburg. 1910. Watercolor

Dmitry Isidorovich Mitrokhin, who lived a great creative life, had the good fortune to study, to cooperate, to be in close relations, to be in associations and societies with many artists, among whom there were those whose trace in the art of the 20th century is comparable to the influence on the course of history of the most important discoveries of the era. The first lines of the artist's autobiographical notes contain the names of M.F. Larionov, N. S. Goncharova and A. V. Fonvizin, who studied side by side and were friends with him - S. T. Konenkov and S. V. Malyutin, with whom he worked in the ceramic artel "Murava".

In Paris, Dmitry Mitrokhin, despite the constrained circumstances and constant employment with work ("high life was not for me"), communicates quite a lot. Almost seventy years later, he recalled his visits to the salon of E. Kruglikova, which, like her Paris workshop, turned into a kind of Russian cultural center, where the "high society" gathered, "but for all those present, art was the main thing", - visits to Maximilian Voloshin, in whose house, according to the artist, he felt "more at ease", where many compatriots who were flying around Lutetia also dropped in, and where he once had a chance to meet with Konstantin Balmont (they were briefly acquainted with 1904), "who brought his daughter, a girl, in a red coat" - here she is in memory of a 90-year-old artist! And these memories are filled with vivid content, visible images of sketches, when he talks about the immediate purpose of his stay in the then capital of arts.

I was fascinated by the street life of Paris. I was perfectly happy in this golden light, with my little notebook in hand. I painted standing in the middle of the street and not risking being crushed by a fiacre. Artists were respected there, they were not considered idlers. The winter was mild, like in our south, nothing interfered with my "wandering" life. You could buy a bag of fried potatoes, warm up by the brazier and chat with the saleswoman at the same time. Better yet were the chestnuts, so gloriously warming the hands. Occasionally I allowed myself to go to a cafe: after asking for a cup of coffee, I would draw for hours, observing this cheerful, motley, impoverished life

.

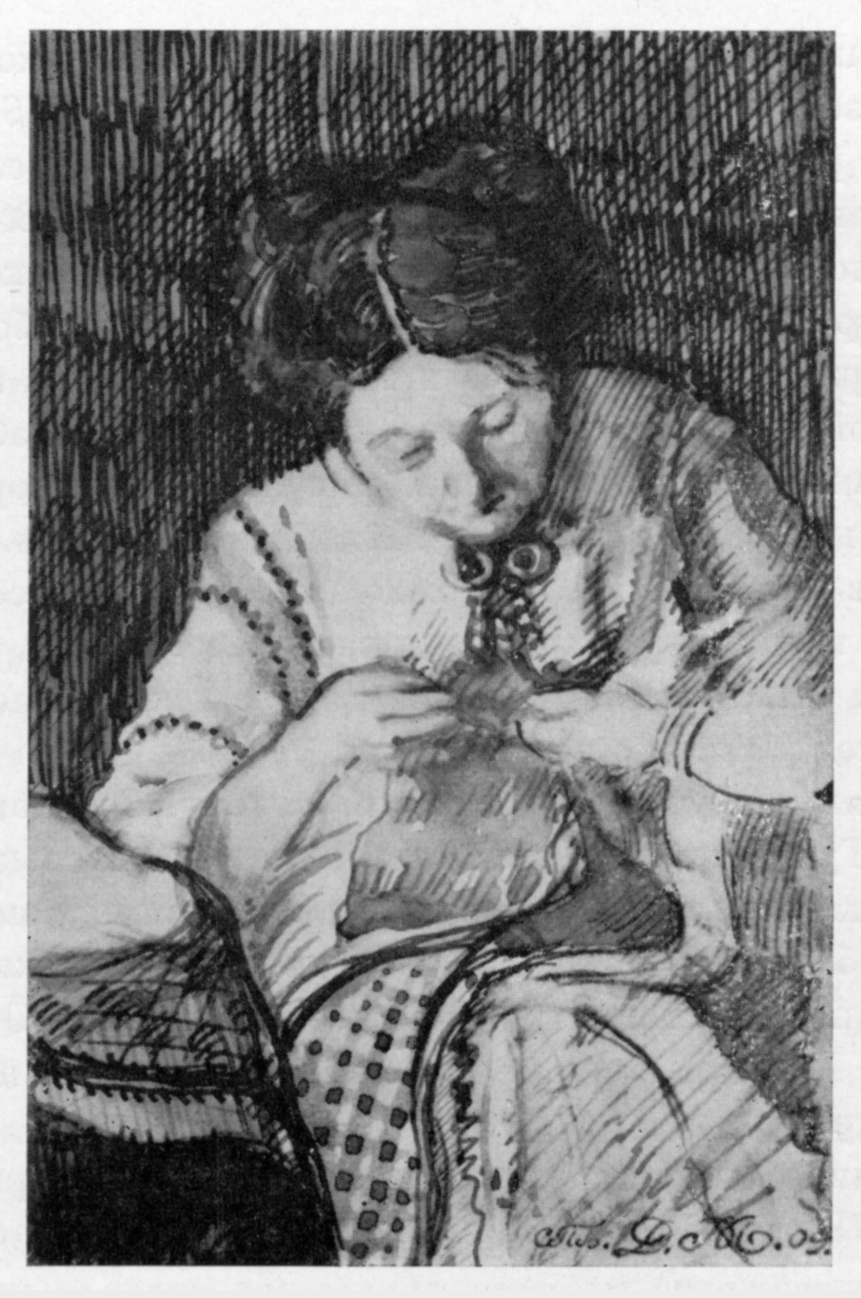
D. Mitrokhin. Alice Bruschetti. 1909. Ink

Talking about his Parisian times, it is not by chance, and not without a tinge of pride, he notes that posters of Toulouse-Lautrec were still hanging on the streets of the French capital - according to D.I.Mitrokhin himself, who had a strong influence on him - as, indeed, and on Paul Klee, with whose influence, for some time, was bizarrely combined in the line of the artist's work that he was aware of - as well as the impact, at certain stages, of his great interest in the art of Henri Matisse and Paul Cézanne, Constantin Guise.

In different periods of comprehending the paths of expressiveness and mastery, this interest was focused on their different manifestations, and with a different measure of their impact on the artist's worldview, - then ephemeral and almost opportunistic, and therefore easily and painlessly overcome, what were, for example, salon, beardsley, modern trends, - those that required a longer "neutralization", purely decorative, stylized ornamental, popular prints and printed motifs, or, on the contrary, in the form of a deep, essential understanding, which was realized in the artist's system of views - Western European and Japanese engraving - on fundamental principles that were not limited to an understanding of technology - engraving in general, drypoint, chiaroscuro, lithography, in particular. "But, having gone through these hobbies," M.V Alpatov squeals, "he returned to such values of art that outgrow the boundaries of time and space and exist everywhere".

It is significant that in the very first words about the beginning of his apprenticeship, the artist recalls the library of the school, "about the enormous and exciting happiness" that "gave the collection of engravings of the Rumyantsev Museum".

To no less extent, in any case - on the possession of the means of self-expression in terms of technical, than contact with the product of printing - a book (in terms of intellectual development - knowledge of graphics), the artist's acquaintance with the printing process, including manual, which he I thoroughly knew from my grandfather's childhood workshop - "The typesetters were my friends. The words typesetting, veneer, space, letter, size, cliche, proofreading are familiar from childhood".

=== Book graphics ===
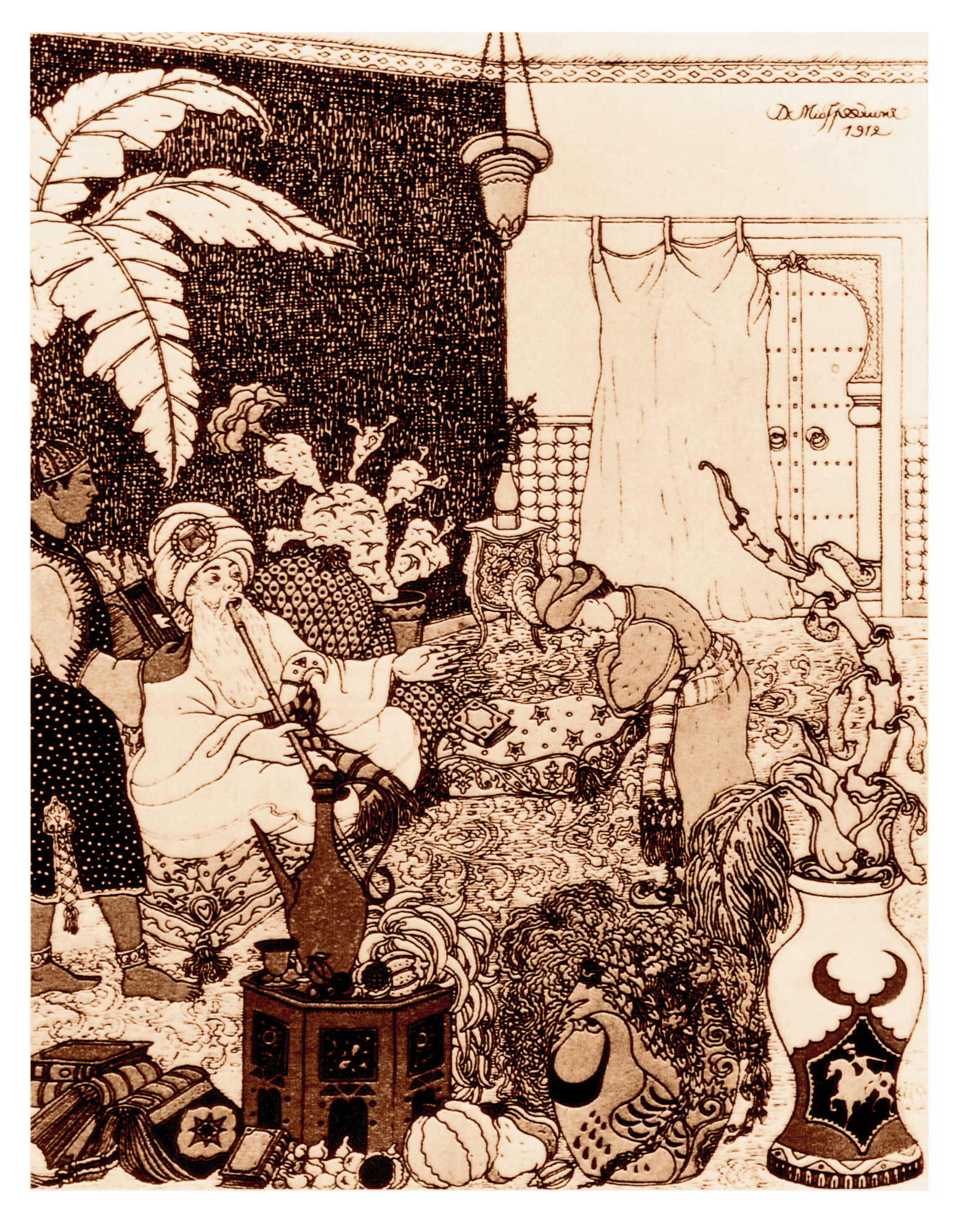
D. Mitrokhin. Illustration for the "History of Almansor" V. Gauff. 1912

Dmitry Mitrokhin owes his first experiments in book graphics to the teacher of watercolors of the Stroganovka S. I. Yaguzhinsky, in 1904, who offered him "a small job for publishing houses", and appreciated it - Valery Bryusov, at that time - the chief editor of "Scorpion". Upon his return in 1908 from Paris, where he got acquainted with S.P. Yaremich, who in turn introduced the artist to E.S.Kruglikova, who had lived in France for many years, to the famous Polish sculptor Eduard Wittig, in whose workshop Dmitry Mitrokhin lived in difficult days, he moved to St. Petersburg, and began to work systematically as a book illustrator, which quickly brought him fame, and which was facilitated by his acquaintance with the artists of the "World of Art". At the initial stage of the successful development of D. I. Mitrokhin's creativity as a book artist, magazine illustrator, of course, the assistance of E. E. Lanceray, who sent publishers to him, also affected ("I drew models with him. He invited them for his painting in the hall of the library of the Academy of Arts ... The first years of my life in St. Petersburg were very much brightened by the attention of Evgeny Evgenievich Lanceray. " - D. Mitrokhin. Autobiographical Notes (1973)). At the same time, he begins to engrave on linoleum (at V.D. Falileev), - "He engraved color compositions, he printed not with oil paints, but with watercolors - in the Japanese way". Collaborates with many book publishers: "I. N. Knebel "," Golike and Vilborg "," Enlightenment "," Pechatnik "," M. and S. Sabashnikovs "(for them D. I. Mitrokhin developed a printer's mark)," Apollo "," M. V. Popov "and many others. others. Continues studying the collections of engravings in the library of the Academy of Arts and the Hermitage. Works a lot on illustrations for children's books, over magazine screensavers, double titles, endpapers, etc. Rare in beauty and sonorous expressiveness, chased performance - "Uyezdnoye" by E. Zamyatin (1916; publishing house of M. V. Popov), "Russian Tales of Grandfather Peter" by Arthur Ransom (1916; London and Edinburgh) and many others.

The fact that most of all speaks of what Dmitry Mitrokhin is as an artist of the book is extremely important, while she was, albeit a large, but far from the main stage in his work - always, working on the design of this or that publication, with all the variety of graphic techniques to which the artist turned, he was guided by a single principle for all elements of the book - starting with the cover, endpapers and ending with type, decor - all of them are subject to stylistic commonality.

We started out with a hatred of what was being done in the graphics around us. But hatred alone is not enough. Knowledge is needed. We turned to the history of prints and books. There they found an excuse for their hatred and confirmation of the correctness of their path. The old masters of the Venetian, Basel and Lyons printing houses and the Nuremberg engravers proved to be excellent teachers and consultants who did not refuse precious instructions and now to everyone who needs it. - D. Mitrokhin. Autobiographical Notes (1973)

- 1911 - illustrates children's books by I. Knebel's publishing house (until 1914).
- 1912 - works on the covers of the series for the publishing house M. and S. Sabashnikovs.
- 1913 - collaboration in the magazines "Satyricon" (until 1914) and "New Satyricon" (until 1917); - cover of the "Cup" by V. A. Zhukovsky (publishing house I. N. Knebel, Moscow); - in March at the invitation of the Dresden Society "Kunstverein" participates with G. Yakulov in an exhibition of watercolors.
- 1914 - decorative borders of the magazine "Lukomorye" (until 1917).
- 1915-1916 - made many book covers.
- 1916 - admitted to the "World of Art"; - performs graphic design for the book by Arthur Ransome "Russian Tales of Grandfather Peter" (A. Ransome "Old Peter's Russian Tales" - London); - at the end of the year, he started working in the department of engravings and drawings of the Russian Museum (further work for printing is in the list).
- 1917 - mobilization into the army with a secondment to the Trophy Commission; - in September, in connection with the death of his father, he goes to Yeisk, where he will stay until the end of next year - "I devoted a lot of time to writing from nature, worked a lot with lead pencil and watercolors, painted landscapes, interiors, still lifes and portraits."

In Soviet times, the artist successfully developed this work, which has absorbed him and is performed by him with love, enthusiastically and very successfully combining it with engraving, etching, and lithography. He designed and illustrated a huge number of books and magazines in various publishing houses - "The lights", "Petropolis", "Petrograd", "Think". "Surf" and many others, in the best of them - Academia (with which he collaborated for about six years): "Seven Love Portraits" by A. de Rainier (1920, 1921; Petrograd), Marina Tsvetaeva's fairy tale poem "Tsar Maiden" (1922); - perky feather drawings made in a manner that has already become traditional for the artist for the decoration of Edgar Poe "Golden Beetle" (1922), "Epsine" by Ben Johnson (1920, 1921; "Petropolis"), - illustrations by Victor Hugo (1923), Henri Barbusse, Octave Mirbeau, "Comedy Books" by Aristophanes (1930), "Ethiopics" by Heliodorus (1932) and many others, - the author of various decorative elements of many publications.

- 1918 - returns to Petrograd at the end of the year; - Appointed head of the Department of Engravings and Drawings of the Russian Museum.
- 1919 - Professor of the Higher Institute of Photography and Photographic Technique (until 1923); - works on covers for the "People's Library" of the State Publishing House; - series covers (up to 1926).
- 1921 - the book of Vs. Voinov "Book signs of DI Mitrokhin" (other publications about D. I. Mitrokhin are on the list).
- 1924 - Professor of the Printing Department of the Academy of Arts (course of book graphics - until 1934).

In the 1920, D.I.Mitrokhin again comes into contact with children's literature, he illustrated and designed several books, among which the already mentioned "Golden Beetle" by Edgar Poe (1921-1922) and "A Journey to the Country of Cinema" by V. Shklovsky (1926), "October Alphabet" (1927) should be distinguished. The work on the latest edition once again confirms the artist's brilliant mastery of the art of type. The appearance of the two-volume satirical novel by Karl Immerman "Munchausen" (1930-1932) suggests that the artist very ingeniously approached the solution of the entire structure of this publication: the characters of the work are sharply caricatured, which turned into peculiar, entertaining comments on the book, the layout of the title pages is witty; binding, flyleaf, dust jacket - everything is in harmony. Since the fall of 1939, D. I. Mitrokhin worked on the design of the book of fairy tales by Hans Christian Andersen, having received an order from a German publishing house. As can be understood from the artist's letters, he continued to create interesting illustrations, judging by the few surviving copies, already in mid-June 1941 - this edition was not destined to see the light of day...

He has developed several dozen publishing brands, trade emblems and labels. In the field of "small forms", which was mastered by DI Mitrokhin back in the 1910s, a book sign occupies a special place. A master of composition, well versed in both the decorative and graphic components of the book, subtly feeling its nature, he made almost fifty ex-librises (most of them belong to 1919–1923) - these works are ranked among the best created in this genre in Russia.

But in the period from the end of the 1920s to the mid-1930s, the artist moved away from book graphics, only periodically and without previous interest returning to it. After the war, he rarely does any work for publications. An exception can be considered illustrated and designed by D. I. Mitrokhin in 1959 "French fairy tales" (M. GIHL), and one of the last - the book of memoirs by M. V. Nesterov (M. "Art"), designed by him in the same year.

The work of D.I.Mitrokhin underwent changes over the course of almost half a century of his vigorous activity in this field, as if anticipating the artist's appeal to the only possible for him, but also the most vivid, unique form of application of his talent - drawing, which from a certain moment will be destined to become universal expressive means of his worldview. One gets the impression that the same "preparatory" function was performed by other types of easel graphics, as if they helped the artist find this lapidary, intelligible, but far from monosyllabic language of the works that are basic in terms of content and capacity of the individual, completely independent graphic handwriting.

=== Woodcut, cutter, lithography ===
Having the opportunity to retrospectively perceive this creative experience, one can observe in its development just such a tendency: since the mid-1930s, book graphics are no longer of paramount importance in the artist's work, they are beginning to give way to woodcuts, metal engraving, drawing and watercolors. Working from nature was never excluded from the number of regular classes, from the sphere of interests of D.I.Mitrokhin, moreover, in this area he constantly sought, improved, which resulted in a gradual transformation of the meaning and content of the picture: from the "school of nature", necessary in understanding the tradition to which he belonged, to the expressed independent value of the original easel sheet.

- 1923 - the beginning of systematic woodcutting (until 1934).
- 1925 - the first personal exhibition (Kazan - 250 sheets).
- 1927 - begins to engrave with a cutter and dry point on metal (until 1951).
- 1928 - began to engage in lithography (until 1934).
- 1935-1941 - works on a series of engravings of the cycle "Leningrad landscapes" (Petrogradskaya side, Central Park of Culture and Rest).
- 1941 - in the first days of the Great Patriotic War he volunteered for the people's militia; - 58-year-old artist works for the General Staff Publishing House, for the Blood Transfusion Institute ("The History of Blood Transfusion" (1941-1942); - created about 100 pencil and watercolor drawings, including those dedicated to the life of the besieged city.
- 1942 - on the morning of 1 January, the artist's wife, Alisa Yakovlevna Bruschetti, died; - in the summer he works from life on the streets of the besieged city and exhibits his drawings; - at the end of the year, D. I. Mitrokhin, after staying in the hospital, in a state of extreme exhaustion, was evacuated to Almaty.
- 1943 - member of the Board of the Union of Artists of Kazakhstan and Chairman of its section of graphics, exhibits, is mainly engaged in watercolors.

D. I. Mitrokhin began engraving on wood "almost out of curiosity", under the influence of Vsevolod Vladimirovich Voinov - one of the initiators and propagandists of the revival of woodcuts, as an independent (non-reproduction) easel technique, with whom Dmitry Isidorovich was well acquainted with the "World of Art", - and on museum work; in 1941 they joined the militia together, survived the blockade, together they were in Alma-Ata. V. Voinov introduced to woodcuts and B. M. Kustodiev, who due to illness in his last years was not completely isolated from creativity only thanks to engraving.

D. I. Mitrokhin made a little more than 70 engravings, but even this relatively small number of works in this area allows him to be ranked among the best Russian masters of woodcuts. Starting with techniques close to the "black style", when the artist gave preference to a white, slightly rough stroke, later he comes to "a silvery scale rich in half-tones and various textured elements"; he is alien to any kind of "showiness with virtuosity" - initially in woodcut he is attracted by pictorial expressiveness, for this purpose he sometimes illuminates prints with watercolors - sometimes barely noticeable, sometimes - corpuscular and juicy. And here one can observe the integrity of Mitrokhin's art, as evidenced by the well-traced interrelation of his woodcut and drawing.

In the works of this period (1920s - late 1930s) landscape cycles predominate - there are many woodcuts and engravings (the artist deliberately did not turn to etching, appreciating the clean living line of a dry needle and chisel), lithographs dedicated to the then outskirts of Leningrad - the wastelands of Petrogradskaya sides, squares of islands. "Mitrokhin endlessly became attached to the very special landscape of this part of the city in those years. It is here, thanks to the rapid development of the beginning of the century, interrupted by the First World War and the revolution, a kind of architecturally disorganized conglomerate of large apartment buildings with blank firewalls was created, wastelands with mighty old trees, endless fences and surviving wooden houses. The landscape, which could not be seen in other parts of the former capital, captivated Mitrokhin with the nagging contrast of the city that suddenly stopped in its offensive and the islets of nature heroically resisting him".

Beginning with the Parisian sketches, the genre theme is invariably present in the work of Dmitry Mitrokhin. It goes back to its roots in a stable and rich tradition, originating in antiquity, - continued in medieval book graphics, in oriental miniatures, in drawings by old masters, in engravings of the Renaissance, in Dürer's folk types, among small Dutchmen, in Russian popular prints, and finally in Japanese ukiyo-e engraving. It acquires the greatest social acuteness in the 18th century in the famous series of French and English prints "The Screams of Paris" and "The Screams of London"; this tradition is developed by drawings, lithographs and porcelain figurines of St. Petersburg folk types of the early 19th century.

And if street scenes, small figures of passers-by, like a kind of "staffage", bring to life almost all of the landscapes of D. I. Mitrokhin, then in his urban suite of woodcuts from the mid-1920s - early 1930s, the character, "the man from the street", takes center stage. The works of these kindly ironic, now almost grotesque cycles, together with a series of lithographs and engravings of larger formats, most closely correspond to the named tradition ("Street types", "Ice cream man" "Football player" "Flower seller" "Floor polisher" "Petrorayrabcoop " other).

At the same time, in the 1930s, in a series of end engravings by D.I.Mitrokhin, devoted to the life of the Azov region, romantic motives come to replace the "genre", dictated by the artist's interest "in the plot in its specific forms, concern for the decorative integrity and woodcut expressiveness of the sheet".

Fluency in the techniques of woodcutting, which D.I.Mitrokhin came to in the mid-1930s, naturally leads the artist to switch his interests to engraving with a chisel, which already attracted him at that time. While end engraving and lithography have experienced a revival since the 1920s, chisel engraving in Russia has already lost the features of high art, having only applied value; in Western Europe, it was also only in the 10s and 20s that some masters began to come to an understanding of its independent value for graphics, which had also long been there among only handicraft and reproductive ones. The artist, having a general idea of the technique of incisor engraving, did not have living examples around him, and it is precisely the understanding of its possibilities for solving independent tasks of the graphic artist from the very first experiments that leads the master away from reproductive techniques - he "draws" with a graver. In this regard, Yu.A. Rusakov rightly noted: "It is no exaggeration to say that this was a new discovery of engraving with a chisel". Enriching tonal possibilities, the master also works with a dry needle, the freer discipline of the line of which also brings it closer in the achieved effects to natural drawing, drawing with a pen, which was one of the author's tasks - to preserve their liveliness and warmth. But he does not imitate the drawing, but only tries, thanks to this use of the possibilities of engraving on metal, to give the print a fresh impression, an emotional character.

In the 1920s, he turned to the same theme: landscapes of the Petrograd side, still life, Yeisk, however, it receives a plot expansion - the works acquire great dynamics, in some cases - the quality of painting. In the mid-30s, he created a cycle of large-format prints dedicated to the Central Park of Culture and Leisure - several panoramic landscapes based on sketches made from windows. A separate small group of works consisted of still lifes engraved by D. I. Mitrokhin at the turn of the 30s-40s, which by the author initially meant light watercolor painting; the general state of these works is close to the vision to which he came much later.

The metal engraving by D. I Mitrokhin is a unique phenomenon in the Soviet art of the pre-war period. The true artistry with which the master was able to embody the delicate emotional structure and lyricism of his artistic nature did not find a response to support this fresh undertaking, and the real area of his work, truly alone, occupies a place among "the largest phenomena of European engraving on metal of the 20th century" - notes the artist, art critic Yu. A. Rusakov. A recognized expert, expert in etching Zvontsov Vasily Mikhailovich agrees with him: "He was the only one to develop the art of carving up to the present day. This idea of Mitrokhin was reinforced by the stories about him of the older generation of artists, my teachers (V. N. Levitsky, L. F. Ovsyannikov, G. S. Vereysky and others)".

Until the second half of the 1920s, he only twice turned to stone work. From created by D.I.Mitrokhin in lithography, half refers to 1928, the first year of his full-fledged study of this printing technique.

In order to preserve the lively contact of a soft lithographic pencil with the working surface, he neglects the corn copier, which allows transferring a previously made drawing - the artist works directly on the stone. And here he uses all the wealth of techniques: he draws with a wide light stroke, uses a pen, lightens the tone, scratching long parallel strokes (which is possible only when working directly on the printing plane). Most of all he made easel lithographs for monochrome prints - on one stone, but several lithographs were printed from two or even three stones (1929-1931).

His lithographs are dominated by the same theme as in the end engraving - Leningradskaya Street, fishing Yeisk. Best Series - "Six lithographs colored by the author" (1928). And here the artist's attention is focused on colorful street types, these works bring to us the image of the city, the scent of a bygone era ...

A short fascination with this technique resulted for D. I. Mitrokhin with the experience of using it in book graphics - the "Selected Works" by N. S. Leskov (1931) were designed.

- 1944 - moves to Moscow in July; from that time on, he began to systematically engage in watercolors and drawing; periodically returns to book graphics (until the 1960s).
- 1946 - resumes engraving on metal (until 1951).
- 1959 - begins to work with colored pencils.
- 1967-1969 - made several drypoint prints.
- 1969 - awarded the title of Honored Artist of the RSFSR.
- 1971 - the last article by D. I. Mitrokhin "To draw every day" ("Creativity", No. 4).
- 1973 - exhibitions in the Small Gallery of the publishing house "Art" (Dresden) and "To the 90th anniversary and 70th anniversary of creative activity" in the Union of Artists of the USSR in Moscow (more than 800 sheets). On 7 November, the artist passed away.

During the Moscow period of creativity D.I.Mitrokhin returned twice to metal engraving - 20 prints from the second half of the 1940s - early 1950s and several works in the late 1960s. Among these works there are several first-class, of which should be called "Ram" (1948) - very expressive, dynamic engraving, - "Apple and Nuts" (1969), which, even without the implied coloring, gives the impression of being completely finished.

=== Pictures ===
With all the successes of D. I. Mitrokhin in book graphics and achievements in engraving, the most significant and significant part of his work is easel drawing. This concept unites both pencil work itself, and watercolors, and works made in mixed media - the main occupations of the last thirty years of his life. Hundreds of small easel sheets (overwhelmingly the size of a postcard, notebook page) contain the most vivid and impressive expression of the artist's worldview; in them graphic and pictorial principles merged very organically; these suites created over the years - life-filled diary pages.

Most of those who have studied the legacy of Dmitry Isidorovich Mitrokhin come to the conclusion that the last thirty years of his creative life appear to be the most interesting in many ways. This is the method which completely satisfied the artist, did not shackle, did not force to comply with the order, it is a universal form of self-expression he found, to which he, when consciously, and when unconsciously, did not go for many years, it is a synthesis of everything understood and suffered by him, resulting in an intoxicated, measured narration, composed by simple natural words of a clear and harmonious language of hundreds of works. In such an assessment of the last period, without denying the importance of everything he had done earlier, all who knew and appreciated his work are in solidarity: M. V. Alpatov, Yu. A. Rusakov and E. A. Kibrik, N. I. Khardzhiev, V. M. Zvontsov, A. Ransome and I. V. Golitsyn, finally - the sculptor L.V. Chaga, who understood this work very subtly and empathically, who became a sensitive and not indifferent witness to the triumph of truly free art.

Vasily Mikhailovich Zvontsov, head of the editorial staff of the publishing house "Aurora" (1973-1977) - the best Russian of that time, and preparing for publication a book about D. I. Mitrokhin, was forced to rebuild the monograph, after seeing in its entirety what the artist had done in recent decades. He speaks of the "unexpected and overwhelming" impression these notebooks made on him: "At the last stage of this path, the artist has reached the extraordinary perfection, possible in rare cases. He gained complete unity of design and means of expression".

Indeed, in the "third" period of his work, D. I. Mitrokhin refuted the established opinion that it was impossible for an artist to have a "fresh look", "young perception" in old age. With his drawings, responding to the opinion of K. Hamsun that "no one can be expected to ... write so well after fifty years, as he wrote before" - with the persuasiveness, generosity and integrity of his works, the master declares that a lot depends on the inner world of this person, and on the discipline that he follows - the artist is no longer able to draw a straight line, but his works shock the confidence of the lines, the sonority of images until the last day.

To those who came to him with the intention of paying tribute to the "living relic", the "last world of art", Dmitry Isidorovich declared that "that Mitrokhin had been gone for a long time," that "Knebel's Mitrokhin" did not interest him at all. "They praised his book graphics ... admired bookplates. Among these visitors there were not only "scribes", "collectors", but also artists. None of them recalled either Mitrokhin's engravings or his drawings. Dmitry Isidorovich was very annoyed by such visitors, blushed angrily and said that he was "not dead yet"... With wide, heavy steps he walks through the rooms. The clothes are too loose on his emaciated body. I remembered the sculptures of Giacometti. But the eyes look sharp and young. And the hands, unusually expressive, have retained their grace and strength to the end". And depending on the readiness of the person who came to perceive the search that worried the artist at that moment, D. I. Mitrokhin was perceptive - he always "saw the interlocutor very well", he laid out the last works in front of him: amazingly diverse landscapes seen from the same window, very meaningful performances - two, three objects, various interiors, seen in the same room...

=== "Still-Leben" ===
At the time when he started, the general trend of spatial creativity meant "getting rid" of the dictates of an unambiguous understanding of nature - so P. Klee, following P. Cézanne, one of the first to challenge, according to R. M. Rilke in a letter to V. Gausenstein, "as shipwrecked or trapped in polar ice, overcoming myself, seeks to write down his observations and experiences until the last minute, so that their lives would make a trail on the blank spaces of the sheet, where no one had been able to get there before" - this inevitable need to overcome the "academic impasse", finally exhausted itself of photonaturalism, but also - salon, taste, "manners", "imitations" and "reconstructions", when the imprinted objects were devoid of content; however, non-figurative art at some point reached the "great limit" - indifferent, both to the author and to the "consumer" of art, forms (in response to the dispassionate play of themselves) again became only a pretext, and not an expression of thought.

Initially, D. I. Mitrokhin, by the will of fate, ended up in the camp of those who were closest to the salon, but then in Russia it was the inevitable path of aesthetics, opposed to the dominance of vulgarity, which unceremoniously invaded art; he experienced other influences, step by step overcame them two-thirds of his way, while remaining, moreover, a first-class master.

"The way back", but the way to "new spaces", was also difficult before the time, when "a new voice broke through" it is painful. "Orders from publishers are being stopped. Customers are disappointed - the former master virtuoso does not exist".

According to L. Chag, the artist had to start with studies, timid drawings, the "mud" of student still lifes, black shadows. This wise artist returns the "objectivity" to the depicted - with only one difference: now the "components of the narrated" are spiritualized, he endows them with a new sense of participation, without the need for a sentimental-decorative, super-realistic or prohibitively generalized - they are not indifferent to the viewer, through their claiming the right to a confidential, sincere dialogue between the artist and him... The author is a representative of the same "main forces" (once a Polish artist asked about the time of their arrival), who do not proclaim their novelty, without declaring themselves in military terminology as "vanguard units" (which ceased to be such, as soon as they were taken into their arms by mass culture, and are announced everywhere), calmly and consistently, without advertising and affectations, started doing well your favorite business, giving new meaning and space - there is no need for giant formats to express big thoughts.

These cycles do not need to be systematized - everything is already clear: glass, pharmacy dishes, fruits, fish, flowers, dried flowers...

By the way, the flowers here are not just beautiful plants or their varieties, they have not only the qualities of living things, but also the properties to convey the shades of the mood of their "second" creator - a conscientious, patient and thoughtful student of the "first". Thanks to the care of the author, pharmacy bottles actively exceed their utility. Fruits rejoice, nuts are lurking, shells are about to fight, there are chairs - continuation of its owners, and not vice versa.

"There were also 'Anderson's' plots - a needle and a pin, a skein of twine. Handicraft toys - whistles, horses, roosters, wooden, painted eggs - appeared in the drawings in the most unexpected incarnations and interpretations: they changed color, proportions, were transferred to an imaginary space, scenes, "little tragedies" were played out".

The dry branches of an old tree are generously strewn with flowers.

Only the great masters of this genre in the 17th century or in our time, G. Morandi, things, objects and fruits live such a full and deep and individual life, as in the drawings of D. I. Mitrokhin. Once A. P. Chekhov, pointing to the ashtray, said: "If you want, I will write a story about it." These are the "stories" the artist wrote with pencils and watercolors. But they are least of all literature. These plants, fruits and objects are seen by the artist with some extraordinary depth and insight, in each of them he feels like a person, locked in a form, dressed in color, but telling him about the secret of creation ... - E. Levitin.

I don't like the word "still life". Better another term "Still — Leben". A calm, hidden life that an artist can and should see ... Almost always I find in things some kind of kindness, friendliness. And I want to talk about it. ... When I look at my drawings, the most successful ones seem alien to me, but I feel the shortcomings as my own ... When I am asked which of my works I value the most, I usually answer: those that will be done tomorrow. Because the work of a lifetime is preparation for what you will do tomorrow. - D. I. Mitrokhin. About the figure.

== Artistic associations in which D. I. Mitrokhin was a member ==
- 1904-1908 - "Murava" (Artel of artists-potters). Moscow.
- 1905-1924 - Moscow Association of Artists.
- 1906-1911 - The Leonardo da Vinci Society. Moscow.
- 1909-1913 - Tverskoy socio-pedagogical circle.
- 1910-1923 - Union of Russian Artists (URH). Moscow - St. Petersburg (Leningrad).
- 1911-1914 - "Ring" (Group of artists). Kharkiv.
- 1915-1917 - "Apartment No. 5". Petrograd.
- 1916-1924 - "The World of Art". St. Petersburg - Petrograd.
- 1916-1929 - Imperial (from 1917 - All-Russian) Society for the Encouragement of Arts (OPH); from 1917 - in the committee. Petrograd - Leningrad.
- 1919-1922 - "House of Arts". Petrograd.
- 1922-1932 - Association of Artists of Revolutionary Russia. Moscow.
- 1923-1928 - "Sixteen" (Group of Artists); 1923, 1924 and 1927 - participated in exhibitions.
- 1923-1929 - "Heat - color". Moscow.
- 1921-1928 - Community of Artists; since 1923 - member of the board. Petrograd - Leningrad.
- 1926-1929 - Association of graphic artists at the House of Printing. Moscow.
- 1928-1929 - Section of Engravers (OPH); founding member. Leningrad.
- 1928-1930 - Society of Painters (OJ); founding member. Leningrad.
- 1928-1932 - Society of Graphic Artists; founding member. Leningrad.
- 1932-1939 - headed the graphic section of the Leningrad branch of the Union of Artists of the USSR (LOSH).

== Books and articles about D.I.Mitrokhin ==
- Zamirailo V. D. I. Mitrokhin. - "Mirror". 1911. No. 20
- Mantel A.D. Mitrokhin. Preface by N. Roerich. Kazan. 1912
- Levinson A. Art publications. - "The Day" (Appendix "Literature, Art and Science"). 1913, December 16.
- Filosofov D. Beautiful books. - "Speech". 1915, January 19.
- Lisenkov E. Two books with drawings by Mitrokhin. - "House of Arts". 1921, no. 2, p. 108, 109.
- Voinov Vsevolod. Book signs of D.I.Mitrokhin. Petersburg. 1921.
- M. Kuzmin, Voinov Vsevolod. D. I. Mitrokhin. Moscow. 1922.
- Kuzmin M. Voinov V. D. I. Mitrokhin. Moscow—Petrograd. 1922.
- Kuzmine M. Voïnov V. D. I. Mitrokhine. Moscou—Pétrograd. 1922.
- Ettinger P. D. I. Mitrokhin. M .: Children's literature. 1940.
- Rusakov Yu. New works of D. Mitrokhin. M .: Art. 1961.
- Alpatov M. Drawings by the artist Mitrokhin. The magazine "Decorative Art of the USSR" No. 5. 1962. P. 32, 33.
- Koivtun Y. Dmitry Mitrokhin’s Metal Engravings. Soviet Literature. Moscow. 1964. I. PP. 167, 169.
- Rusakov Y. Dmitry Isidorovich Mitrokhin. L. - M. 1966.
- Alexandrova N. D. I. Mitrokhin. - The art of books. V. 5.M. 1968. S. 146-153.
- Zvontsov V. Legacy of Dmitry Isidorovich Mitrokhin (1883-1973) - "Art" magazine. No. 8. 1974. P. 33-38.
- Suris B. Dmitry Mitrokhin. - Soviet graphics '73. M. 1974. S. 78-84.
- Alpatov M. Drawings by Mitrokhin in recent years. - Questions of Soviet fine arts. M. 1975.S. 238-251.

== Bibliography ==
- Dmitry Mitrokhin. L.: Aurora Publishing House. 1977.
- The book about Mitrokhin. Articles, letters, memoirs. Compiled by L. V. Chaga. Preparation of the text and notes by I. Ya. Vasilyeva. - M .: Artist of the RSFSR. 1986
- D.I. Mitrokhin. Works of recent years. Set of postcards (bilingual). - Leningrad .: Aurora. 1973
- The World of Art Movement – In early 20th—century Russia. Aurora Art Publishers. Leningrad. 1991 ISBN 5-7300-0215-7
- Dmitry Mitrokhin. - Rusakov Yu. A. Selected works of art history. - St. Petersburg .: Aletheia. 2000. P. 221 ISBN 5-89329-205-7
- Lebedeva, I. V. (1988). "Society of Painters. To the history of art painting of Leningrad in the 1920s". Soviet art history. Issue 24 (Sat. articles. ed.). Soviet artist. pp. 348–361.
