= How I Learned Geography =

2008 book by Uri Shulevitz

- Cover of How I Learned Geography
- Author: Uri Shulevitz
- Illustrator: Uri Shulevitz
- Cover artist: Uri Shulevitz
- Language: English
- Genre: children's book
- Published: 2008
- Publication place: United States

How I Learned Geography, by Uri Shulevitz, is a fictional story recasting a childhood memory. It received the Caldecott Honor in 2009.

== Plot summary ==
Driven from home by a "war [that] devastated the land," a family flees to a remote city in the steppes. One day, the father returns from the market not with bread for supper but with a wall-filling map of the world. "'No supper tonight,' Mother said bitterly. 'We'll have the map instead.'" Although hungry, the boy finds sustenance of a different sort in the multicolored map, which provides a literal spot of brightness in the otherwise spare, earth-toned illustrations, as well as a catalyst for soaring, pretend visits to exotic lands. Shulevitz's rhythmic, first-person narrative reads like a fable for young children. Its autobiographical dimension, however, will open up the audience to older grade-schoolers, with an endnote describing Shulevitz's life as a refugee in Turkestan after the Warsaw blitz, (in World War II) including his childhood sketch of the real map. Whether enjoyed as a reflection of readers' own imaginative travels or used as a creative entree to classroom geography units, this simple, poignant offering will transport children as surely as the map it celebrates.

According to Elizabeth Devereaux, the children’s reviews editor at Publishers Weekly, there is a common theme among Shulevitz's children's books: The destruction of family happiness, the reversal of fortune, the foolish bargain, the impossible task: all these classic themes control this story. She continues to say, "In framing his own story, replacing autobiographical fact with archetypal forms, Shulevitz keeps the focus on the inner world that he has so consistently illuminated. Once again, he reminds us that folly is not the opposite of wisdom, but so close a relative that the two are often mistaken."

== Illustrations ==
Uri Shulevitz not only writes, but illustrates his children's books as well. As described by Joanna Rudge Long, who reviewed this book in The Horn Magazine, "Shulevitz's skillfully composed, emotionally charged art, evocative scenes of the family leaving war-torn Europe on foot and traversing Asia's "dusty steppes," with its dour, angular villages, give way to the dreamlike splendor of the boy's escape into imagination." To the right are illustrations taken from the book to show the dreamlike world the boy explores.
