= Carl Abel =

German comparative philologist (1837–1906)

- Born: 25 November 1837; Berlin, Kingdom of Prussia
- Died: 26 November 1906 (aged 69); Wiesbaden, German Empire
- Occupations: Comparative philologist, lexicographer
- Known for: Linguistic Essays, work on comparative lexicography, translation of Shakespeare's works into German
- Notable work: Linguistic Essays, Über den Gegensinn der Urworte
- Children: Curt Abel-Musgrave
- Parent: Gerson Abel
- Relatives: Richard Musgrave (grandson)

Carl Abel (25 November 1837 – 26 November 1906) was a German comparative philologist from Berlin who wrote Linguistic Essays in 1880. Abel also acted as Ilchester lecturer on comparative lexicography at the University of Oxford and as the Berlin correspondent of the Times and the Standard. His 400-page dictionary of Egyptian-Semitic-Indo-European roots appeared in 1886. His essay "On the antithetical meanings of primal words" (Ueber den Gegensinn der Urworte) was discussed by Sigmund Freud in an identically titled piece, which, in turn, was discussed by Jacques Derrida as a precursor to deconstruction's semantic insights. He also translated some of Shakespeare's works into German.

He was the son of a successful banker, Gerson Abel. Of Jewish descent, he converted to Christianity.

Abel died in Wiesbaden. His son Curt Abel-Musgrave (1860–1938) was a writer and translator. His grandson was noted economist Richard Musgrave.

== Work ==
- Über einige Grundzüge der lateinischen Wortstellung. Zweite Auflage. Dümmler, Berlin 1871. Digitalized
- Über den Begriff der Liebe in einigen alten und neuen Sprachen. C. G. Lüderitz’sche Publishing house and bookstore Carl Habel, Berlin 1872.
- Koptische Untersuchungen. Dümmler, Berlin 1876. Reprinted: Sändig Reprint, Niederwalluf near Wiesbaden 1970.
- Slavic and Latin. Ilchester Lectures on comparative lexicography. Oxford University, Oxford 1883 (Digitalized).
- Über den Gegensinn der Urworte. Wilhelm Friedrich, Leipzig 1884 (Digitalized).
- Sprachwissenschaftliche Abhandlungen. Publishing house Wilhelm Friedrich, Leipzig 1885 (Digitalized).
- Einleitung in ein aegyptisch-semitisch-indoeuropaeisches Wurzelwörterbuch. Publishing house Wilhelm Friedrich, Leipzig 1886 (Digitalized). Reprinted: M. Sändig, Wiesbaden 1969.
