= William Ralston Shedden-Ralston =

British scholar and translator (1828–1889)

William Ralston Shedden-Ralston (1828–1889), known in his early life as William Ralston Shedden, who later adopted the additional surname of Ralston, was a noted British scholar and translator of Russia and Russian.

== Biography ==
William Ralston Shedden-Ralston (1828–1889) was born on 4 April 1828 in York Terrace, Regent's Park, London, as the third child and only son of William Patrick Ralston Shedden (1794–1880) and Frances Sophia Browne (born 1804). His mother was the 3rd daughter of William Browne (1762–1833) of Galway, Calcutta and Sydney. His father, born in New York, of Scottish paternity and schooled in Scotland, had made his fortune as a merchant in Calcutta, India, before setting up home in Palmira Square, Brighton. William Ralston Shedden-Ralston spent most of his early years there. Together with three or four other boys he studied under the Rev. John Hogg of Brixham, Devonshire, until he went to Trinity College, Cambridge in 1846, where he studied law and graduated with a BA in 1850.

In 1852, William's father entered into a lengthy but unsuccessful litigation over his claim to the Ralston estates in Ayrshire, Scotland. The cost dissipated his fortune. The family pressed the claim for many years. William's sister, Annabella Jean Ralston Shedden (1823–1873), took up the pleadings, and at one stage in 1861 conducted the case before a committee of the House of Lords for more than thirty days while their father was in prison for unpaid legal debts. William had prepared for and been called to the bar before his father's litigation began, but the change in the family's fortunes after the initial unfavourable decision in 1852, forced him to seek a more secure living. He also adopted the additional surname of Ralston.

On 1 September 1853, William went to work as a junior assistant in the printed-book department of the British Museum, where his zeal and ability won the respect of his superiors. The work began with the requisite two years copying titles for the printed books catalogue, and thereafter he rose slowly through the ranks. When he saw a need for someone who could catalogue Russian books, he began studying Russian, and even learned pages of the dictionary by heart.

William also studied Russian literature. He translated 93 of Ivan Andreevich Krylov's two hundred fables, and this work, published in 1868 as Krilof and his Fables, ran to numerous editions. The following year he brought out a translation of Ivan Turgenev's Nest of Gentlefolk as Liza; in 1872, his 439-page Songs of the Russian People as Illustrative of Slavonic Mythology and Russian Social Life, and in 1873 a bloodthirsty collection of Russian Folk Tales. Arthur Ransome read his book of Russian Folk Tales in 1913 and saw what rich material there was in Russian folklore, but thought Ralston's "literary prose" unsuitable; so retold some Russian tales in simple language for children in Old Peter's Russian Tales.

He made two or three journeys to Russia, formed numerous literary acquaintances there, and had a lasting friendship with Turgenev. He also became a corresponding member of the Imperial Academy of Sciences of St. Petersburg. He visited Serbia twice, and made numerous visits to Germany, Belgium, and Switzerland.

In 1874, William published Early Russian History, the substance of four lectures delivered as the Ilchester Lectures at the Taylor Institution in Oxford. His visits to Russia were mainly to collect material for another, more comprehensive account. Having contracted for its publication with Messrs. Cassell & Co, at the last moment he allowed them to cancel the agreement and publish instead Donald Mackenzie Wallace's book Russia.

He also possessed a gift for narrating stories orally. He devised a novel form of public entertainment, telling stories to large audiences in lecture-halls, making several successful appearances at St. George's Hall (for the Sunday Lecture Society) and St James's Halls. He gave story-tellings to the young princes and princesses at Marlborough House, and to other social gatherings; and also, in aid of charities, to audiences in east London and the provinces.

His health failing, he resigned from the British Museum in 1875 and sought to devote himself to literary work, but he was susceptible to acute depression and became increasingly withdrawn. Nevertheless, he wrote for the Athenæum magazine and the Saturday Review, as well as the Nineteenth Century and other magazines.

Early in 1889 William moved to 11 North Crescent, London, where he was found dead in bed on 6 August the same year. He was buried in Brompton Cemetery. He was unmarried.
