= Rabbit Ears Productions =

Television production company

Rabbit Ears Productions, LLC
- Type: Subsidiary
- Industry: Television production
- Founded: 1985
- Headquarters: South Norwalk, United States
- Products: Storybook Classics; We All Have Tales; American Heroes and Legends; The Greatest Stories Ever Told; Holiday Classics
- Parent: Vanguard Animation (2024-present)

Rabbit Ears Productions is a production company best known for producing three television series that feature individual episodes adapting popular pieces of children's literature. Rabbit Ears episodes have been released on home video, broadcast on Showtime, and rerun on PBS. The series features actors, such as Robin Williams, Raul Julia, Laura Dern, Denzel Washington, Meryl Streep, John Hurt, Danny Glover and others narrating children's books that are either well known in the United States or around the world. In a style similar to today’s motion comics, the series used limited animation by moving still images through each scene. Rabbit Ears Productions has also won numerous awards, including Parents' Choice Awards and Grammy Awards.

The stories were released on CDs, VHS, and DVD by several distributors, including Random House Home Video (1985 to 1986), Sony Video Software (1987 to 1990), and Uni Distribution Corp.

Rabbit Ears Productions was acquired by Vanguard Animation in early 2024; the studio then began uploading full episodes of its programs onto its official YouTube channel.

== Stories ==
=== Storybook Classics ===
From 1984 to 1990, Rabbit Ears Productions created a set of storybook classics that were well known around the world. Probably the most popular storybook classic from Rabbit Ears Productions was The Velveteen Rabbit, the first story that Rabbit Ears Productions had created. The Velveteen Rabbit also received many awards, such as a Parents' Choice Award and a nomination for a Grammy Award. Showtime acquired the broadcast rights to Storybook Classics in 1987.

=== We All Have Tales ===
From 1991 to 1995, Rabbit Ears Productions created the next set of stories that were collected from around the world, including the countries of Russia, France, Jamaica, England, Germany, Colombia, Scandinavia, Japan and India.

=== American Heroes and Legends ===
From 1992 to 1993, Rabbit Ears Productions made another set of stories that originated in the U.S., about great American heroes, such as John Henry, Johnny Appleseed, and many other heroes and heroines who made a great impact on American society.

=== The Greatest Stories Ever Told ===
From 1991 to 1993, Rabbit Ears Productions created its final installments, relating to stories from the Bible.

The Bible stories are (only released on audio CD):

- The Creation
- Noah and the Ark
- Joseph and His Brothers
- Moses in Egypt
- Moses the Lawgiver
- David and Goliath
- Jonah and the Whale
- The Savior is Born
- Parables That Jesus Told

Of the 9 Bible stories, the first 7 focus on stories from the Old Testament (Genesis, Exodus, Samuel and Jonah), and the final 2 focus on stories from the New Testament.

This series was not shown on television. Of the 13 Bible stories, 10 were released on VHS and DVD. None were in the order found in the Bible, except The Creation (which was first) and Parables That Jesus Told (which was last).

In The Creation video, the narrator concludes that Adam and Eve ventured into the world. They "went out into the world until they returned to the ground from which they were made".

=== Holiday Classics ===
Holiday Classics are stories that are found throughout all the Rabbit Ears Productions series, whether they are Christmas, Halloween or Easter-themed.

== Cast and stories ==
=== Cast ===
- Danny Aiello: told Pinocchio
- Rubén Blades: told Joseph and his Brothers
- Nicolas Cage: told Davy Crockett
- Michael Caine: told King Midas and the Golden Touch
- John Candy: told Stormalong
- Keith Carradine: told Annie Oakley
- Cher: told The Ugly Duckling
- Mel Gibson: told David and Goliath
- John Cleese: told Tom Thumb
- Glenn Close: told The Emperor and the Nightingale / The Legend of Sleepy Hollow
- Geena Davis: told Princess Scargo and the Birthday Pumpkin
- Laura Dern: told The Song of Sacajawea
- Jodie Foster: told The Fisherman and His Wife
- Morgan Freeman: told Follow the Drinking Gourd / The Savior is Born
- John Gielgud: told The Emperor's New Clothes
- Danny Glover: told Brer Rabbit and Boss Lion / Brer Rabbit and the Wonderful Tar Baby / How the Leopard Got His Spots / Moses in Egypt
- Whoopi Goldberg: told Koi and the Kola Nuts
- Amy Grant: told The Creation / The Gingham Dog and the Calico Cat / The Lion and the Lamb
- Graham Greene: told Squanto and the First Thanksgiving
- Bob Hoskins: told The Bremen Town Musicians
- Holly Hunter: told The Three Billy Goats Gruff / The Three Little Pigs
- John Hurt: told Aladdin and the Magic Lamp
- William Hurt: told The Boy Who Drew Cats
- Anjelica Huston: told Rip Van Winkle
- Jeremy Irons: told The Steadfast Tin Soldier
- Raul Julia: told The Monkey People
- Michael Keaton: told Mose the Fireman
- Garrison Keillor: told Johnny Appleseed / Parables that Jesus Told
- Ben Kingsley: told The Tiger and the Brahmin / Moses the Law-giver
- John Lone: told The Five Chinese Brothers
- Kelly McGillis: told Thumbelina / Noah and the Ark
- Jack Nicholson: told The Elephant's Child / How the Rhinoceros got his Skin / How the Camel got his Hump
- Catherine O'Hara: told Finn McCoul
- Michael Palin: told Jack and the Beanstalk
- Christopher Reeve: told The Lion and The Lamb
- Jason Robards: told Jonah and the Whale
- Meg Ryan: told Red Riding Hood / Goldilocks
- Susan Saint James: told A Gingerbread Christmas
- Susan Sarandon: told The Firebird
- Sissy Spacek: told The Talking Eggs
- Meryl Streep: told The Tale of Mr. Jeremy Fisher / The Tale of Peter Rabbit / The Velveteen Rabbit / The Night Before Christmas / The Tailor of Gloucester
- Max von Sydow: told East of the Sun, West of the Moon
- Emma Thompson: told The White Cat
- Kathleen Turner: told Rumpelstiltskin
- Tracey Ullman: told Puss in Boots
- Denzel Washington: told John Henry / Anansi
- Sigourney Weaver: told Peachboy
- Robin Williams: told The Fool and the Flying Ship / Pecos Bill
- Jonathan Winters: told Paul Bunyan

=== Crew ===
- Mark Sottnick: Executive Producer, Producer, Director
- Mike Pogue: Executive Producer
- Eric Metaxas: Writer
- Brian Gleeson: Writer
- C.W. Rogers: Animation Department, Film Editing, Production Design
- Tim Raglin: Illustrator, Art Direction, Director
- Paul Elliott: Art Director
- Ken Hoin: Producer
- Doris Wilhousky: Executive Producer
- Susan C. Anderson: Production Director

== Episodes ==
=== Storybook Classics ===
No.	Title	Narrated by	Illustration and music	Original release date
1	"The Velveteen Rabbit"	Meryl Streep	Illustrated by : David Jorgensen; Music by : George Winston	March 9, 1985 (public television stations)
When a young boy receives a toy rabbit for a gift, the toy rabbit realizes that when someone loves you so much, you can become real.
2	"The Ugly Duckling"	Cher	Illustrated by : Robert Van Nutt; Music by : Patrick Ball	1985 (VHS); October 5, 1987 (Showtime)
When a young duckling is rejected from his family because of his ugly looks, he embarks on a journey to realize the true meaning of beauty.
3	"The Elephant's Child"	Jack Nicholson	Illustrated by : Tim Raglin; Music by : Bobby McFerrin	1986 (VHS); September 14, 1987 (Showtime)
When a curious elephant child wants to know about the crocodile that lives in the river, he gets a big surprise that might change his life forever.
4	"The Steadfast Tin Soldier"	Jeremy Irons	Illustrated by : David Jorgensen; Music by : Mark Isham	1986 (VHS); October 12, 1987 (Showtime)
This is the story of a one-legged tin soldier who goes through many perilous adventures in the outside world to get back to his true love, the ballerina.
5	"The Tale of Mr. Jeremy Fisher / The Tale of Peter Rabbit"	Meryl Streep	Illustrated by : David Jorgensen; Music by : Lyle Mays	1987 (VHS); September 28, 1987 (Showtime)
The Tale of Mr. Jeremy Fisher: Mr. Jeremy Fisher, the frog, wants to go fishing for minnows for his dinner. Unfortunately, he is about to find out the dangers of going fishing alone. The Tale of Peter Rabbit: Naughty Peter Rabbit goes off to Mr. McGregor's garden against his mother's warnings, but he soon learns about the consequences of disobeying his mother.
6	"The Emperor and the Nightingale"	Glenn Close	Illustrated by : Robert Van Nutt; Music by : Mark Isham	1987 (VHS); September 21, 1987 (Showtime)
When the Emperor of China finds out about the beautiful music of the nightingale, he wishes to have the nightingale by his side. That is, until a new rival, a mechanical bird, shows up and outstages the nightingale. But, when the Emperor faces death, he will soon realize that the nightingale is the one who truly cares for him in his time of need.
7	"How the Rhinoceros Got His Skin / How the Camel Got His Hump"	Jack Nicholson	Illustrated by : Tim Raglin; Music by : Bobby McFerrin	1987 (VHS); October 19, 1987 (Showtime)
How the Rhinoceros Got His Skin: When the Rhinoceros rudely eats the Parsee Man's cake, the Parsee Man's revenge causes the Rhinoceros to have the skin he has today. How the Camel Got His Hump: When the Camel refuses to do any work in the desert, it is up to the Djinn of the desert to set him straight.
8	"Pecos Bill"	Robin Williams	Illustrated by : Tim Raglin; Music by : Ry Cooder	1988 (VHS); July 3, 1988 (Showtime)
Join the legendary cowboy Pecos Bill on his adventures of being raised as a coyote to being the hero when a cyclone threatens Texas.
9	"The Legend of Sleepy Hollow"	Glenn Close	Illustrated by : Robert Van Nutt; Music by : Tim Story	1988 (VHS); October 10, 1988 (Showtime)
Washington Irving’s eerie tale of romantic rivalry along the Hudson pits the new schoolmaster Ichabod Crane against the local hero and bully, Brom Bones, for the hand of Katrina Van Tassel. This haunting drama climaxes with the appearance of one of the great, legendary ghosts of all time: the Headless Horseman.
10	"The Tailor of Gloucester"	Meryl Streep	Illustrated by : David Jorgensen; Music by : The Chieftains	1988 (VHS); April 1, 1988 (Showtime)
When a poor tailor has to make a lovely Christmas coat for the mayor on his wedding day, he gets help from an unexpected source.
11	"The Fisherman and His Wife"	Jodie Foster	Illustrated by : Diana Bryan; Music by : Van Dyke Parks	1989 (VHS); December 18, 1989 (Showtime)
When a poor fisherman discovers a magic flounder in the sea, he goes home to tell his wife. But, as his wife's greed for the better life comes to the point where she wants to take over the world, the fisherman soon realizes that his wife's greed will get the best of them yet.
12	"Thumbelina"	Kelly McGillis	Illustrated by : David Johnson; Music by : Mark Isham	1989 (VHS); September 12, 1989 (Showtime)
A long time ago in Denmark, a childless couple is blessed with a radiantly beautiful baby girl. She is no bigger than a thumb, so she is called Thumbelina. Snatched from her family by an ugly toad who wants to marry her, Thumbelina escapes, befriending various creatures of the forest. Ultimately, she meets the king of the flower angels, with whom she finds happiness forever.
13	"How the Leopard Got His Spots"	Danny Glover	Illustrated by : Lori Lohstoeter; Music by : Ladysmith Black Mambazo	1989 (VHS); November 27, 1989 (Showtime)
When all the animals in the forest has fled to the jungle to avoid being eaten, the Leopard and the Ethiopian both have to change their colors in order to blend in with the jungle and find the animals.
14	"The Three Billy Goats Gruff / The Three Little Pigs"	Holly Hunter	Illustrated by : David Jorgensen; Music by : Art Lande	1989 (VHS); October 17, 1989 (Showtime)
The Three Billy Goats Gruff: When a troll threatens to eat up the billy goats who want to eat the grass on the other side of the bridge, the biggest billy goat is the one who teaches the troll a lesson he'll never forget. The Three Little Pigs: When the Big Bad Wolf eats up the first and second little pigs, he'll learn the hard way that he shouldn't mess with the smartest pig of the three little pigs.
15	"The Emperor's New Clothes"	Sir John Gielgud	Illustrated by : Robert Van Nutt; Music by : Mark Isham	1990 (VHS); November 6, 1990 (Showtime)
Like everyone else in the kingdom, two clever swindlers understand the Emperor's passion for new clothes. Claiming to be creators of the richest and most beautiful cloth in the world, they cleverly announce that the "magical" garments they are weaving for the Emperor are invisible to anyone lacking intelligence. Who will have the courage to speak the truth?
16	"Paul Bunyan"	Jonathan Winters	Illustrated by : Rick Meyerowitz; Music by : Leo Kottke	1990 (VHS); October 2, 1990 (Showtime)
Big as a mountain and strong as a grizzly bear, Paul Bunyan was the greatest lumberjack to swagger through the North American forests. All the larger-than-life characters in Paul's supporting cast are here, including Babe the Blue Ox, eating her ton of grain a day, and Hot Biscuit Sally with her acre-and a half griddle.
17	"Red Riding Hood / Goldilocks"	Meg Ryan	Illustrated by : Laszlo Kubinyi; Music by : Art Lande	1990 (VHS); September 6, 1990 (Showtime)
Red Riding Hood: When a young girl with a red cape encounters the Big Bad Wolf in the woods, she learns the hard way that nothing good comes out of talking to strangers. Goldilocks: When a spoiled girl goes to the house of the three bears and sneaks inside, she will soon get a surprise of her life when the bears come home from their walk.
18	"Brer Rabbit and the Wonderful Tar Baby"	Danny Glover	Illustrated by : Henrik Drescher; Music by : Taj Mahal	1990 (VHS); March 1, 1990 (Showtime)
When Brer Fox gets tired of Brer Rabbit's sassiness, he decides to make a Tar Baby that will trap Brer Rabbit for sure. But Brer Fox soon finds out that Brer Rabbit is trickier than he looks.
19	"The Talking Eggs"	Sissy Spacek	Illustrated by : Neil Brennan; Music by : Michael Doucet with BeauSoleil	June 4, 1995 (PRI)
A young girl named Ruby Rouge befriends a mysterious old woman who gives her magical eggs.

=== We All Have Tales ===
No.	Title	Narrated by	Illustration and music	Original release date
1	"The Fool and the Flying Ship"	Robin Williams	Illustrated by : Henrik Drescher; Music by : Klezmer Conservatory Band	April 9, 1991 (Showtime)
A story from Russia. When the Tsar of Russia proclaims that whoever builds a flying ship will marry his daughter, a country fool takes the challenge and meets some odd superhumans along the way.
2	"Peachboy"	Sigourney Weaver	Illustrated by : Jeffrey Smith; Music by : Ryuichi Sakamoto	May 7, 1991 (Showtime)
Set in Ancient Japan, a young child is found inside a peach by an old couple, and he must embark on a journey to rescue people from a band of ogres.
3	"Jack and the Beanstalk"	Michael Palin	Illustrated by : Edward Sorel; Music by : David A. Stewart	June 4, 1991 (Showtime)
A story from England. When Jack sells his cow for some lousy looking beans, his mother goes into a rage and throws the beans out the window. However, Jack soon discovers that those beans were no ordinary beans and he begins a journey to get the riches that lies on top of the beanstalk. However, Jack soon discovers that the riches are not the only things on the beanstalk.
4	"East of the Sun, West of the Moon"	Max von Sydow	Illustrated by : Vivienne Flesher; Music by : Lyle Mays	June 5, 1991 (VHS); July 10, 1991 (Showtime)
A story from Scandinavia. When a young girl befriends a mysterious bear, she learns about the curse that has been set upon the bear and embarks on a journey to set him free from the curse.
5	"Anansi"	Denzel Washington	Illustrated by : Steven Guarnaccia; Music by : UB40	September 10, 1991 (Showtime)
Two stories from Jamaica feature Anansi the Spider outsmarting various creatures to get their stories. The first story involves Anansi tricking Snake to get the stories from Tiger. The second story involves Anansi trying to admit to the other animals that he is a man after his mother-in-law dies.
6	"The Tiger and the Brahmin"	Ben Kingsley	Illustrated by : Kurt Vargo; Music by : Ravi Shankar	October 1, 1991 (Showtime)
A story from India. When a Brahmin accidentally releases a tiger, the tiger is bent on eating the Brahmin. However, a clever jackal is the one who helps the Brahmin in his time of need.
7	"The Boy Who Drew Cats"	William Hurt	Illustrated by : David Johnson; Music by : Mark Isham	November 5, 1991 (Showtime)
A story from Japan. A young boy who draws cats goes on an adventure to save his village from a demon.
8	"King Midas and the Golden Touch"	Michael Caine	Illustrated by : Rodica Prato; Music by : Ellis Marsalis featuring Yo-Yo Ma	December 13, 1991 (Showtime)
A story from Greece. When King Midas is given the gift to turn objects into gold, he learns that there are things that are more precious than any gold in the kingdom.
9	"The Monkey People"	Raúl Juliá	Illustrated by : Diana Bryan; Music by : Lee Ritenour	January 7, 1992 (Showtime)
A story from Colombia. When a small village starts neglecting their duties, they get help from a mysterious old man who carves leaves in the shapes monkeys that come to life.
10	"Puss in Boots"	Tracey Ullman	Illustrated by : Pierre Le-Tan; Music by : Jean-Luc Ponty	February 18, 1992 (Showtime)
A story from France. Claude, a youngest son of Miller, feels short-changed leaves him nothing more than a tomcat. However, when Claude decides to do away with his feline inheritance, the cat devised a plan to transform his dim-witted owner into a prince.
11	"Rumpelstiltskin"	Kathleen Turner	Illustrated by : Peter Sis; Music by : Tangerine Dream	March 8, 1992 (Showtime)
A story from Germany. A greedy king tells a young daughter of a miller that she must spin a room full of straws into gold by morning, or die. Then a little man tells her anything she please.
12	"Koi and the Kola Nuts"	Whoopi Goldberg	Illustrated by : Reynold Ruffins; Music by : Herbie Hancock	April 7, 1992 (Showtime)
A story from Nigeria. When a young boy by the name of Koi leaves his village because the village does not know how to treat the son of a chief, he embarks on a journey to find a village that will treat him with respect. Koi then makes a few unexpected jungle friends along the way.
13	"Finn McCoul"	Catherine O'Hara	Illustrated by : Peter de Sève; Music by : Boys on the Lough	June 11, 1992 (Showtime)
A story from Ireland. Finn McCoul is the greatest champion in all of Ireland. But when the brutish giant Cucullin is after him, he is a bit nervous.
14	"Pinocchio"	Danny Aiello	Illustrated by : Brian Ajhar; Music by : Les Misérables Brass Band	1992 (VHS); May 9, 1994 (Showtime)
A story from Italy. A woodcarver named Geppetto creates a young puppet named Pinocchio that somehow comes to life.
15	"Aladdin and the Magic Lamp"	John Hurt	Illustrated by : Greg Couch; Music by : Mickey Hart	February 1994 (VHS); April 5, 1994 (Showtime)
A story from the Middle East. This enchanted tale is based on "One Thousand and One Nights" where a young rogue receives wishes from a genie and wins the hand of the Sultan's daughter in marriage.
16	"The Bremen Town Musicians"	Bob Hoskins	Illustrated by : David Johnson; Music by : Eugene Friesen	March 1994 (VHS); January 9, 1995 (Showtime)
A story from Germany. A gang of farmyard animals form a band and travel to the German town of Bremen.
17	"The Five Chinese Brothers"	John Lone	Illustrated by : Kurt Vargo; Music by : Bill Douglass and David Austin	June 14, 1994 (Showtime)
A tale of ancient China; five brothers who each have their own unique gifted strength and power help each other to overcome the challenges when a fateful disaster comes.
18	"The Firebird"	Susan Sarandon	Illustrated by : Robert Van Nutt; Music by : Mark Isham	July 12, 1994 (Showtime)
A story from Russia. A young archer named Ivan gives a feather from the legendary Firebird to the Tsar of Russia, and he must go on a quest to capture the Firebird.
19	"Tom Thumb"	John Cleese	Illustrated by : Tim Gabor; Music by : Elvis Costello	May 28, 1995 (PRI)
20	"The White Cat"	Emma Thompson	Illustrated by : Barbara McClintock; Music by : Joe Jackson	September 24, 1995 (PRI); December 5, 1996 (Showtime)
A story from France. A prince falls in love with an enchanted cat queen.

=== American Heroes and Legends ===
No.	Title	Narrated by	Illustration and music	Original release date
1	"Annie Oakley"	Keith Carradine	Illustrated by : Fred Warter; Music by : Los Lobos	October 14, 1992 (Showtime)
The true story about the real life exploits of a sharp shooter from the Wild West.
2	"Brer Rabbit and Boss Lion"	Danny Glover	Illustrated by : Bill Mayer; Music by : Dr. John	October 21, 1992 (Showtime)
Brer Rabbit teaches Boss Lion a lesson.
3	"Stormalong"	John Candy	Illustrated by : Don Vanderbeek; Music by : NRBQ	October 28, 1992 (Showtime)
The tale of a giant sea captain and his adventures on the open sea.
4	"Rip Van Winkle"	Anjelica Huston	Illustrated by : Rick Meyerowitz; Music by : Jay Ungar and Molly Mason	November 4, 1992 (Showtime)
A lazy man goes to the Catskill mountains with his dog and accidentally ends up sleeping for 20 years.
5	"Davy Crockett"	Nicolas Cage	Illustrated by : Steve Brodner; Music by : David Bromberg	November 11, 1992 (Showtime)
A story about the outlandish adventures of a wild man who eventually becomes a hero.
6	"Follow the Drinkin' Gourd"	Morgan Freeman	Illustrated by : Yvonne Buchanan; Music by : Taj Mahal	November 18, 1992 (Showtime)
A family of slaves try to escape from their masters by following a song.
7	"John Henry"	Denzel Washington	Illustrated by : Barry Jackson; Music by : B.B. King	November 25, 1992 (Showtime)
A young but strong African American must beat a mechanical steam drill.
8	"Princess Scargo and the Birthday Pumpkin"	Geena Davis	Illustrated by : Karen Barbour; Music by : Michael Hedges	March 1993 (VHS); September 26, 1993 (Showtime)
A young Native American princess gives must give up her birthday present in order to save her village.
9	"Johnny Appleseed"	Garrison Keillor	Illustrated by : Stan Olson; Music by : Mark O'Connor	September 19, 1993 (Showtime)
A man named John Chapman goes all throughout the country planting apple trees.
10	"The Song of Sacajawea"	Laura Dern	Illustrated by : Jack Molloy; Music by : David Lindley	October 3, 1993 (Showtime)
Tells the story of how Sacajawea helped Louis and Clark.
11	"Mose the Fireman"	Michael Keaton	Illustrated by : Everett Peck; Music by : John Beasley and Walter Becker	October 10, 1993 (Showtime)
A fireman named Mose Humphrey saves burning buildings in the 1800s.

=== The Greatest Stories Ever Told: 1991–1994 ===
#	Title	Year released	Summary	Narrator	Illustrator	Music
1	The Creation	1991	Tells the story of how God created the world, while also telling the story of Adam and Eve.	Amy Grant	Stefano Vitale	Bela Fleck and the Flecktones
2	Joseph and his Brothers	1991	Tells the story of how Joseph was abused, but later became second in command of the Pharaoh of Egypt.	Rubén Blades	Garnet Henderson	Strunz and Farah
3	Jonah and the Whale	1992	Jonah, a prophet, must escape God after being tasked to go to the city of Nineveh.	Jason Robards	Jeffrey Smith	George Mgrdichian
4	David and Goliath	1992	David, a young shepherd boy must defeat a giant Philistine warrior named Goliath.	Mel Gibson	Douglas Fraser	Branford Marsalis
5	The Savior is Born	1992	Tells the Story of the Birth of Jesus	Morgan Freeman	Robert Van Nutt	The Christ Church Cathedral Choir
6	Noah and The Ark	1992	God tells a man named Noah that he will flood the world for 40 days and 40 nights, so Noah and his family must build a giant ark with two of every animal in it.	Kelly McGillis	Lori Lohstoeter	The Paul Winter Consort
7	Moses in Egypt	1993	Tells the story of Moses, and his journey to free his fellow Israelites from Slavery.	Danny Glover	Phil Huling	The Sounds of Blackness
8	Moses The Lawgiver	1993	Tells the story of how Moses created The Ten Commandments.	Ben Kingsley	John Collier	Lyle Mays
9	Parables That Jesus Told	1994	Jesus Tells the stories of The Sower, The Good Samaritan and The Prodigal Son.	Garrison Keillor	Stan Fellows	David Lindley

=== Holiday Classics: 1986–1994 ===
#	Title	Year released	Summary	Narrator	Illustrator	Music	Holiday
1	Santabear's First Christmas	November 22, 1986 (ABC)	A young bear cub is appointed by Santa Claus to deliver toys on Christmas.	Kelly McGillis	Buck Lewis	Michael Hedges	Christmas
2	The Gingham Dog and the Calico Cat	December 3, 1990 (Showtime)	A puppy and a kitten fall out of Santa's bag and now must journey to their new home.	Amy Grant	Laszlo Kubinyi	Chet Atkins	Christmas
3	A Gingerbread Christmas	1991	The Prince and Princess of Gingerbread must save Christmas from being cancelled.	Susan Saint James	John Spiers	Van Dyke Parks	Christmas
4	Squanto and The First Thanksgiving	1991	Tells the story of Squanto, and how he helped the Pilgrims.	Graham Greene	Michael A. Donato	Paul McCandless	Thanksgiving
5	The Night Before Christmas	December 20, 1992 (Showtime)	A retelling of the classic poem of the same name.	Meryl Streep	William Cone, Greg Couch, Vivienne Flesher, Robert Van Nutt, Bill James, and Tom Christopher	Mark O'Connor, The Edwin Hawkins Singers, The Christ Church Cathedral Choir, Van Dyke Parks, Sarah W. Neill and Meryl Streep	Christmas
6	The Lion and the Lamb	1994	A story based on European Legends.	Amy Grant and Christopher Reeve	Bill Kroyer	Lyle Mays	Christmas

== Audiobooks ==
Many of the stories have been made available as audiobooks through Listening Library.
