= Uri Shulevitz =

American writer and illustrator of children's books (1935–2025)

- אורי שולביץ
- Born: February 27, 1935; Warsaw, Poland
- Died: February 15, 2025 (aged 89); New York City, U.S.
- Occupations: Illustrator, writer
- Spouse: Paula Brown
- Writing career
- Period: 1963–2025
- Genre: Children's picture books
- Notable works: The Fool of the World and the Flying Ship; The Treasure; Snow; How I Learned Geography
- Notable awards: Caldecott Medal; 1969

Uri Shulevitz (Hebrew: אורי שולביץ; February 27, 1935 – February 15, 2025) was an American writer and illustrator of children's books. He won the 1969 Caldecott Medal for U.S. picture book illustration, recognizing The Fool of the World and the Flying Ship, an Eastern European fairy tale retold by Arthur Ransome in 1916.

== Life and career ==
Uri Shulevitz was born in Warsaw, Poland, on February 27, 1935. During the bombing of Warsaw in 1939, a bomb fell into a stairwell of his apartment building when he was at home. The family fled from Warsaw, first to Bialystok, later to Turkestan, experiences that Shulevitz would later capture in his 2020 memoir Chance: Escape from the Holocaust, which the Wall Street Journal then listed among the 20 best children's books of the past 20 years. Eventually, they settled in Paris by 1947, then moved again to Israel in 1949. During the Sinai War in 1956, Shulevitz joined the Israeli Army. Later, he joined the Ein Gedi kibbutz.

Shulevitz moved to New York City in 1959, studying painting at Brooklyn Museum Art School and working as an illustrator for a Hebrew children's book publisher. In 1962, an editor at Harper & Row saw his freelance portfolio and suggested that Shulevitz write children's books. He created his first picture book, The Moon in My Room, in 1963. Shulevitz wrote over three dozen books; the last, The Sky Was My Blanket, about his uncle, who fought alongside the Republican faction during the Spanish Civil War and the French Resistance during World War II, will be published in August 2025.

== Personal life and death ==
Shulevitz lived in New York City with his wife, Paula Brown.

He died from complications of influenza and pneumonia at a Manhattan hospital on February 15, 2025, 12 days before his 90th birthday.

== Works ==
- The Moon in My Room (1963)
- The Mystery of the Woods (1964) (written by Mary Stolz)
- A Rose, a Bridge, and a Wild Black Horse (1964) (written by Charlotte Zolotow)
- The Second Witch (1965) (written by Jack Sendak)
- The Twelve Dancing Princesses (1966) (Brothers Grimm tale adapted by Elizabeth Shub)
- The Carpet of Solomon (1966) (written by Sulamith Ish-Kishor)
- The Month Brothers (1967) (written by Dorothy Nathan)
- Runaway Jonah, and other tales (1967) (written by Jan Wahl)
- One Monday Morning (1967)
- The Silkspinners (1967) (written by Jean Russell Larson)
- My Kind of Verse (1968) (edited by John Smith)
- The Fool of the World and the Flying Ship (1969) (written by Arthur Ransome)
- Rain Rain Rivers (1969)
- The Wonderful Kite (1970) (written by Jan Wahl)
- Oh What a Noise! (1971) (written by William Brighty Rands)
- Soldier and Tsar in the Forest (1972) (written by A N Afanasʹev)
- The Magician (1973) (adapted from the Yiddish of Isaac Leib Peretz)
- The Fools of Chelm and Their History (1973) (written by Isaac Bashevis Singer)
- Dawn (1974)
- The Touchstone (1976) (written by Robert Louis Stevenson)
- The Treasure (1978)
- Hanukah Money (1978) (written by Sholem Aleichem)
- The Lost Kingdom of Karnica (1979) (written by Richard Kennedy) ISBN 0-684-16164-8
- The Golem (1982) (written by Isaac Bashevis Singer)
- Writing With Pictures (1985)
- The Strange and Exciting Adventures of Jeremiah Hush (1986)
- Toddlecreek Post Office (1990)
- The Diamond Tree (1991) (written by Howard Schwartz and Barbara Rush)
- The Secret Room (1993)
- The Golden Goose (1995) (adapted from the Brothers Grimm)
- Hosni the Dreamer (1997) (written by Ehud Ben-ʻEzer)
- Snow (1998)
- What Is a Wise Bird Like You Doing in a Silly Tale Like This (2000)
- Daughters of Fire (2001) (written by Fran Manushkin)
- The Travels of Benjamin of Tudela (2005)
- SoSleepyStory (2006)
- How I Learned Geography (2008)
- When I Wore My Sailor Suit (2009)
- Dusk (2013)
- Troto and the Trucks (2015)
- Chance (2020)
- The Sky Was My Blanket (2025)

== Awards ==
- 1969: Caldecott Medal, The Fool of the World and the Flying Ship
- 1980: Caldecott Honor, The Treasure
- 1999: Charlotte Zolotow Award, Snow
- 1999: Golden Kite Award, Picture Book Illustration, Snow
- 1999: Caldecott Honor, Snow
- 2005: National Jewish Book Award in the Illustrated Children's Book category for The Travels of Benjamin of Tudela
- 2009: Caldecott Honor, How I Learned Geography
