= Koi and the Kola Nuts =

Nigerian folk tale

Koi and the Kola Nuts is a Nigerian folk tale which takes place in an Igbo tribal village. When the son of the chief named Koi decides to leave the village for many weeks, he then returns to the village only to find out his father the chief had died and the villagers forget that the deceased chief even had a son. They accuse Koi of being a liar. The villagers tell Koi to prove he's actually the son of the chief by doing a series of tasks. One task was to retrieve a sac full of kola nuts and retrieve a golden ring that was thrown into the deep part of a river. If he succeeds, they'll believe he is the son of a chief and if he doesn't, they'll eat him.

Koi succeeds in all tasks, but doesn't do all the tasks by himself. With the help of a few jungle creatures, they all save Koi from being eaten by the villagers. Koi proves himself to the village and becomes a chief of the Igbo village.
