= Henrik Drescher =

Danish artist

Henrik Drescher (born in 1955) is a Danish artist.

== Life and work ==
In 1967 Drescher and his family emigrated to the United States. Drescher began studying at the School of the Museum of Fine Arts, Boston but quit after one semester to become an illustrator. While travelling in North America and Europe he kept journals of notes and drawings that informed his later work.

Drescher's editorial illustrations appear regularly in the New York Times, the Washington Post, Newsweek, Time, and Rolling Stone. He has also written and illustrated several books, including books for children.
