= Old Peter's Russian Tales =

Book by Arthur Ransome

- Puffin Books edition, 1974
- Author: Arthur Ransome
- Illustrator: Dmitry Mitrohin
- Language: English
- Genre: Folk tales
- Publisher: T. C. & E. C. Jack
- Publication date: 1916
- Publication place: United Kingdom

Old Peter's Russian Tales is a collection of Russian folk-tales retold by Arthur Ransome, published in Britain in 1916.

== Description ==
The first chapter tells of Maroosia and Vanya who live in a hut of pine logs in the forest with their grandfather, the forester Old Peter. Their father and mother are both dead, and they can hardly remember them. Twenty stories told by Old Peter to the children follow, including The Fool of the World and the Flying Ship.

Ransome says in a note at the beginning that "The stories in this book are those that Russian peasants tell their children and each other", and that it was written for "English children who play in deep lanes with wild roses above them in the high hedges, or by the small singing becks that dance down the grey fells at home".

The book owes its existence to a visit that Ransome paid to Russia in 1913, partly to learn the language, partly to escape from his first marriage. Ransome's introductory note concludes with the words "Vergezha, 1915"; Vergezha, on the river Volkhov, was where Ransome stayed as a guest of Harold Williams and his wife Ariadna.

Ransome says in his autobiography that the English listeners "know nothing of the world that in Russia listeners and storytellers take for granted". So rather than provide a direct translation of his Russian originals as William Ralston Shedden-Ralston had done in his 1873 Russian Folk Tales, which Ransome had encountered in 1913, he read all the variants of the Russian narratives and then rewrote them in his own words with Old Peter, Vanya and Maroosia substituted for Shedden-Ralston's Ogre, Elf and Imp. Publication of his book was delayed, and he thought that the publishers did not expect to sell more than the 2,000 copies of their initial print run. But by 1956, his sales figures had passed 24,000, and another 25,000 copies were subsequently sold in cheaper British editions and in authorized and pirated editions in the United States.

Hugh Brogan wrote that the book was an "indubitable literary success. It has never been out of print. Arthur Ransome's apprenticeship was over".

=== Reprint ===
Old Peter's Russian Tales was republished by the Arthur Ransome Trust in December, 2016. together with The War of the Birds and the Beasts (renamed The Battle of the Birds and the Beasts at Hugh Brogan's suggestion), thereby creating the first combined edition of Arthur Ransome's Russian folk tales. The new edition includes a new introduction by Hugh Lupton, Arthur Ransome's great-nephew, whose own career as a professional storyteller owes much to Arthur Ransome's Russian folk-tales.

== Editions ==
- Ransome, Arthur (1916), Old Peter's Russian Tales, Frederick A. Stokes , illustrated by Dmitry Mitrohin, e-text and images via www.gutenberg.org
- Ransome, Arthur (1916), Old Peter's Russian Tales, Thomas Nelson and Sons. , illustrated by Dmitry Mitrohin, scanned via archive.org
- 2003, UK, Old Peter's Russian Tales, Jane Nissen Books (ISBN 9781903252161), Pub 2003, paperback, illustrated by Faith Jaques
- 2016, UK, Old Peter's Russian Tales & the Battle of the Birds and the Beasts, Arthur Ransome Trust (ISBN 9780995568105), Pub December 2016, paperback, illustrated by Faith Jaques, Introduction by Hugh Lupton
- Old Peter's Russian Tales public domain audiobook at LibriVox
