= Klezmer Conservatory Band =

American klezmer music group

The Klezmer Conservatory Band
- Origin: Boston, Massachusetts
- Genres: Klezmer
- Labels: Kleztone, Vanguard, Rounder
- Members: Grant Smith, Eden MacAdam-Somer, Hankus Netsky, Robin Miller, Mark Berney, Yaeko Miranda-Elmaleh, Mark Hamilton, Jim Guttman, Ilene Stahl
- Past members: Steve Netsky, Don Byron, Judy Bressler, Jeffrey Warschauer, Frank London, Alan Bern, Evan Harlan, Barry Shapiro, Charlie Berg
- Website: klezmerconservatory.com

The Klezmer Conservatory Band is a Boston-based group which performs traditional klezmer music; it was formed by Hankus Netsky of the New England Conservatory of Music in 1980. Originally formed for a single concert, they have gone on to release eleven albums.

Netsky is the grandson and nephew of traditional klezmer musicians. He was inspired by jam sessions with Irish musicians to attempt something with klezmer music. He recruited many of the musicians from the New England Conservatory of Music's Third Stream department with the majority having jazz or folk backgrounds.

In 1988, the band featured in a documentary on klezmer called A Jumpin Night in the Garden of Eden. It has also provided soundtracks for a number of films and theatrical productions including:

- Enemies, a Love Story
- Religulous
- Joel Grey's Yiddish music review Berschtcapades '94
- The Fool and the Flying Ship, narrated by Robin Williams
- Shlemiel the First, a musical based on a play by Isaac Bashevis Singer

== Discography ==
- Yiddishe Renaissance (Kleztone, 1981)
- Klez! (Vanguard, 1984)
- A Touch Of Klez! (Vanguard, 1985)
- Oy Chanukah! (Rounder, 1987)
- A Jumpin' Night In The Garden Of Eden (Rounder, 1988)
- Old World Beat (Rounder 3115, 1991) (Zensor in the same year)
- The Fool And The Flying Ship (with Robin Williams) (Rabbit Ears Productions, 1991)
- The Thirteenth Anniversary Album Live! (Rounder, 1993)
- Dancing In The Aisles (Rounder 3155, 1997)
- Dance Me To The End Of Love (Rounder, 2000)
- A Taste Of Paradise (Rounder Records, 2003)

With Itzhak Perlman, Brave Old World, The Klezmatics, and The Andy Statman Orchestra

- Klezmer (In The Fiddler's House) (EMI Classics, 1996)

With Itzhak Perlman, Brave Old World, Andy Statman, and The Klezmatics

- Live In The Fiddler's House (Angel Records, 1996)
