= Pierre-André Taguieff =

French philosopher (born 1946)

- Occupations: Philosopher, sociologist, political scientist
- Employer(s): National Center for Scientific Research, Paris, and the Political Studies Institute, Paris
- Known for: Research on racism and antisemitism

Pierre-André Taguieff is a French philosopher who has specialised in the study of racism and antisemitism. He is the director of research at the French National Centre for Scientific Research in an Institut d'études politiques de Paris laboratory, the Centre for Political Research (CEVIPOF). He is also a member of the Cercle de l'Oratoire think tank.

Taguieff is the author of a number of books and papers on racism and antisemitism, including The Force of Prejudice: On Racism and Its Doubles (2001) and Rising from the Muck: The New Antisemitism in Europe (2004). He is known in particular for his studies on the French National Front and populism.

== Beliefs and works ==
=== On racism ===
In La Force du préjugé – essai sur le racisme et ses doubles (1987), Taguieff analyzed several different types of racism:

- The first type of racism is against miscegenation, in favor of racial segregation, and wants to preserve differences between various alleged races. 19th century racialism theories, such as Arthur de Gobineau's An Essay on the Inequality of the Human Races (1853–55), are an example of this type of racism, which pretends to be founded on science and on the existence of biological human races. In other words, this pseudo-scientific racism mistakes differences in the amount of melanin (which determines skin color) for racial differences.
- The second type is insidiously hosted by the Enlightenment philosophy of universalism: its dream of unity of mankind may bring it, in specific and extreme cases, to the will to annihilate all cultural differences, amounting to effective genocide or ethnocides. Taguieff's point is not in declaring that the Enlightenment philosophy is racist in itself, but extreme forms of this will of universality may lead, in practice, to the destruction of the plurality of cultures and to the rejection of even moderate forms of multiculturalism.
- The third and more recent type has integrated the cultural relativists' attacks against racism. This new form of racism has reversed the famous anti-racist arguments of ethnologist Claude Lévi-Strauss. According to Lévi-Strauss, different cultures are incommensurable, and, because of this, each one thinks progress and superiority is on its side - Lévi-Strauss, in his 1952 essay for the UNESCO, used the famous metaphor of two trains crossing each other's path: each one thinks he is going the right way, while the other seems not to move or to move backward. Because of this, ethnocentrism is a necessary optical illusion, which in turn racist discourse uses to justify itself.

Taguieff was himself accused of racism on several occasions, for instance when he praised Oriana Fallaci's book The Rage and the Pride. He was also criticized for his contribution to the controversial website Dreuz.info, which French newspaper Le Monde described as "ultra-Zionist" and islamophobic.

Pierre-André Taguieff wrote Les Contre-réactionnaires in 2007, in which he opposed both antiracism and antifascism. He considers them as ideologies which are instrumentalized by far-left groups "aiming to regularize as many illegal immigrants as possible without any regulation".

== Bibliography ==
- Racismes, antiracismes (edited by André Béjin, Julien Freund; with Alain de Benoist et al.), 1986 ISBN 2-86563-163-X
- La Force du préjugé. Essai sur le racisme et ses doubles, Paris, La Découverte, "Armillaire", 1988; rééd. Gallimard, "Tel", 1990. ISBN 2-07-071977-4

- The force of prejudice: on racism and its doubles. University of Minnesota Press, 2001. ISBN 0-8166-2372-4, ISBN 0-8166-2373-2

- The New Cultural Racism in France, Telos 83 (Spring 1990). New York: Telos Press.
- (dir.), Face au racisme, t. 1, Les moyens d'agir; t. 2, Analyses, hypothèses, perspectives, Paris, La Découverte, "Cahiers libres, essais", 1991; rééd. Paris, Seuil, "Points essais", 2 t., 1993. ISBN 2-02-020981-0
- (co-directed with Gil Delannoi), Théories du nationalisme, Paris, Kimé, "Histoire des idées, théorie politique et recherches en sciences sociales", 1991. ISBN 2-908212-10-2
- (dir. and ed.), Les Protocoles des sages de Sion. Faux et usages d'un faux, t. I, Introduction à l'étude des "Protocoles" : un faux et ses usages dans le siècle, t. II, Études et documents, Paris, Berg International, "Faits et représentations", 1992; new edition, Berg International et Fayard, 2004. ISBN 2-213-62148-9
- Sur la Nouvelle Droite. Jalons d'une analyse critique, Paris, Galilée, "Descartes et Cie", 1994. ISBN 2-910301-02-8
- Les Fins de l’antiracisme, Paris, Michalon, 1995. ISBN 2-84186-001-9
- La République menacée. Entretien avec Philippe Petit, Paris, Textuel, "Conversations pour demain", 1996. ISBN 2-909317-20-X
- Le Racisme. Un exposé pour comprendre, un essai pour réfléchir , Paris, Flammarion, "Dominos", 1998. ISBN 2-08-035456-6
- (with Michèle Tribalat), Face au Front national. Arguments pour une contre-offensive, Paris, La Découverte, 1998. ISBN 2-7071-2877-5
- La Couleur et le sang : doctrines racistes à la française, Paris, Mille et une Nuits, "Les petits libres", 1998; new edition, coll. "Essai Mille et une Nuits", 2002. ISBN 2-84205-640-X
- (with Grégoire Kauffmann and Michaël Lenoire, dir.), L'Antisémitisme de plume (1940–1944). La propagande antisémite en France sous l'Occupation. Études et documents, Paris, Berg International, "Pensée politique et sciences", 1999. ISBN 2-911289-16-1
- L’Effacement de l’avenir, Paris, Galilée, "Débats", 2000. ISBN 2-7186-0498-0
- Résister au bougisme. Démocratie forte contre mondialisation techno-marchande, Paris, Mille et une Nuits, "Essai", 2001. ISBN 2-84205-584-5
- (co-directed with Gil Delannoi), Nationalismes en perspective, Paris, Berg International, "Pensée politique et sciences sociales", 2001. ISBN 2-911289-37-4
- Du Progrès. Biographie d’une utopie moderne, Paris, EJL, "Librio", 2001. ISBN 2-290-30864-1
- La Nouvelle judéophobie, Paris, Mille et une Nuits, "Essai", 2002. ISBN 2-84205-650-7

- Rising from the muck: The New anti-Semitisme in Europe. Ivan R. Dee, 2004.

- L'Illusion populiste : de l'archaïque au médiatique, Paris, Berg International, "Pensée politique et sciences sociales", 2002; new edition : L'Illusion populiste. Essais sur les démagogies de l'âge démocratique, Paris, Flammarion, "Champs", 2007. ISBN 978-2-08-120365-5
- (dir.), Le Retour du populisme. Un défi pour les démocraties européennes, Paris, Encyclopedia Universalis, "Le tour du sujet", 2004. ISBN 2-85229-780-9
- Le Sens du progrès. Une approche historique et philosophique, Paris, Flammarion, "Champs", 2004; 2006. ISBN 2-08-080167-8

- "Does progress have a future?", A conversation with Pierre-André Taguieff, in Queen's Quarterly, December 22, #111, 2004.

- Prêcheurs de haine. Traversée de la judéophobie planétaire, Paris, Mille et une Nuits, "Essai", 2004.
- L'Illusion antifasciste. La Gauche et le Terrorisme intellectuel à la française, Paris, Mille et une Nuits, 2004 (articles).
- La République enlisée. Pluralisme, communautarisme et citoyenneté, Paris Éditions des Syrtes, 2005. ISBN 2-84545-092-3
- La Foire aux illuminés. Ésotérisme, théorie du complot, extrêmisme, Paris, Mille et une nuits, 2005. ISBN 2-84205-925-5
- L'Imaginaire du complot mondial. Aspects d'un mythe moderne, Paris, Mille et une nuits, 2007. ISBN 2-84205-980-8
- Les Contre-réactionnaires. Le progressisme entre illusion et imposture, Paris, Denoël, 2007. ISBN 978-2-207-25321-2
- Julien Freund, au cœur du politique, La Table ronde, Paris, 2008. ISBN 2-7103-2947-6

== See also ==
- Protocols of Zion (2005 film)
