= Saigon Execution =

1968 photograph by Eddie Adams

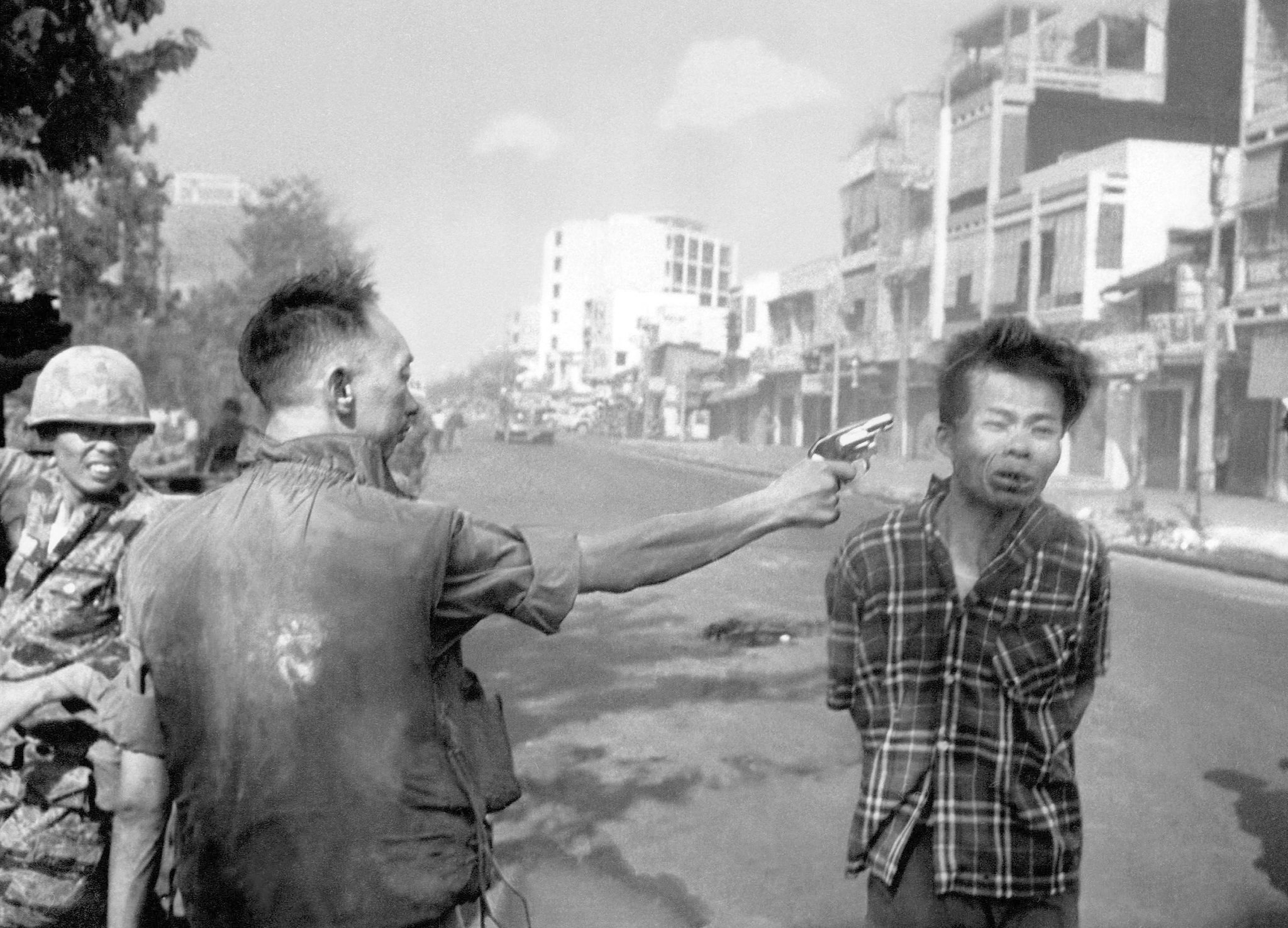
Saigon Execution

Saigon Execution is a 1968 photograph by Associated Press photojournalist Eddie Adams, taken during the Tet Offensive of the Vietnam War. It depicts South Vietnamese police chief Nguyễn Ngọc Loan shooting a Viet Cong courier near the Ấn Quang Pagoda in Saigon. The photograph was published extensively by American news media the next day, and would later win Adams the 1969 Pulitzer Prize for Spot News Photography and the 1968 World Press Photo of the Year.

== Background ==
Lê Công Nà, who is believed to be the person executed, was a political operative of the Viet Cong tasked with organising political and covert operations. However, the widow of Nguyễn Văn Lém asserts that the man executed in the photo was her husband.

Nguyễn Ngọc Loan was the chief of the Republic of Vietnam National Police (RVNP), and a brigadier general of the Army of the Republic of Vietnam (ARVN). He had anticipated the Tet Offensive, and was responsible for coordinating the ARVN response in Saigon – including commanding the RVNP to capture the Ấn Quang Pagoda, which the VC were using as a base of operations.

Eddie Adams was an Associated Press (AP) war photographer. Having previously served as a US Marine, he had a reputation for being fearless, taking pictures close to danger, and for being often "in the right place at the right time". Adams had been in Vietnam since 1965 to cover the war, and on February 1, 1968 he heard from the NBC about fighting in Chợ Lớn. He met with NBC journalist Howard Tuckner, cameramen Võ Huỳnh and Võ Suu, and soundman Lê Phúc Đinh. They shared a car to Chợ Lớn to cover the conflict.

== Incident ==
Võ Suu's video of the execution, broadcast on The Huntley–Brinkley Report, February 2, 1968.

The NBC and AP crews arrived at the Ấn Quang Pagoda the same morning, and having seen nothing of interest by noon, were preparing to leave. A cameraman for the American Broadcasting Company (ABC) was also present. Meanwhile, Lém was captured by Vietnamese Marines while wearing civilian clothing and carrying a Type 54 pistol. The Marines escorted him to where the journalists happened to be. The journalists noticed this; the NBC and ABC cameramen began filming. (Note: Võ Huỳnh and Võ Suu were on opposite sides of the street. Huỳnh carried a silent camera, and Suu a sound-on-film camera.) Loan instructed a Marine to kill Lém, but he was reluctant, so Loan unholstered his gun, a .38 Special Smith & Wesson Bodyguard revolver. The ABC correspondent was spooked by Loan and stopped filming. (Note: He did not resume filming until after the gunshot.) Adams believed this was merely an intimidation tactic, but nonetheless prepared to take a photo. Loan then shot Lém. At the same time, Adams snapped the photo, photographing the moment the bullet was still inside Lém's head. Lém fell to the ground, blood spurting out of the wound. Loan then explained his actions to the journalists, citing the Americans and South Vietnamese that had died. (Note: Exactly what was said is disputed. Eddie Adams reported "They killed many of my men and many of your people". Howard Tuckner reported "Many Americans have been killed these last few days and many of my best Vietnamese friends. Now do you understand? Buddha will understand." Several other variations were published in periodicals.) A Marine placed a VC propaganda leaflet on Lém's face. His body was left in the street and later taken to a mass grave.

== Justifications ==
=== Loan in interviews ===
According to Oriana Fallaci in her book Nothing, and So Be It, Loan explained shooting Lém in a 1968 interview by arguing that Lém "wasn't wearing a uniform and I can't respect a man who shoots without wearing a uniform... I was filled with rage." In a later 1972 interview with Tom Buckley of Harper's Magazine, when asked why he killed Lém, Loan said "When you see a man in civilian clothes with a revolver killing your people ... what are you supposed to do? We knew who this man was. His name was Nguyễn Tân Đạt, alias Hàn Sơn. He was the commander of a sapper unit. He killed a policeman. He spit in the face of the men who captured him."

=== Lém's previous actions ===
As part of the Tet Offensive, the Viet Cong conducted the targeted killings of prominent people who opposed them, including civilians. Some authors have suggested that Lém was involved in such activities. A story emerged during the 1980s that Lém had just murdered a police major, a subordinate and close friend of Loan, and the major's whole family. Eddie Adams believed and repeated this story. "It turns out that the Viet Cong lieutenant who was killed in the picture had murdered a police major – one of General Loan's best friends – his whole family, wife, kids, the same guy. So these are things we didn't know at the time." "I didn't have a picture of that Viet Cong blowing away the family." In 2008, reporting emerged that Lém had murdered the family of Lieutenant Colonel Nguyễn Tuấn, who was not a subordinate of Loan, but an officer in the armored forces of the ARVN at Phu Dong in the north of Saigon. Vietnam war historian Edwin E. Moïse, while acknowledging the murder of Tuấn and his family by Viet Cong, believes the story of Lém's culpability is South Vietnamese propaganda, noting the later stories about Lém's actions were not part of Loan's initial explanations. Noting this position, historian Max Hastings wrote "the truth will never be known". A similar skeptical assessment was made by researcher Christopher Saunders.

== Reactions in the United States ==
The event received extensive attention in the United States during the coming days; the photo was published on most American newspapers the next morning, and 20 million people saw the NBC's film of it on The Huntley–Brinkley Report that evening. Various other organizations and American politicians commented on the event.

The photograph is commonly characterized as having created a massive shift in American public opinion against the war. Historian David Perlmutter found little to no evidence to back up this claim.

== Photograph ==
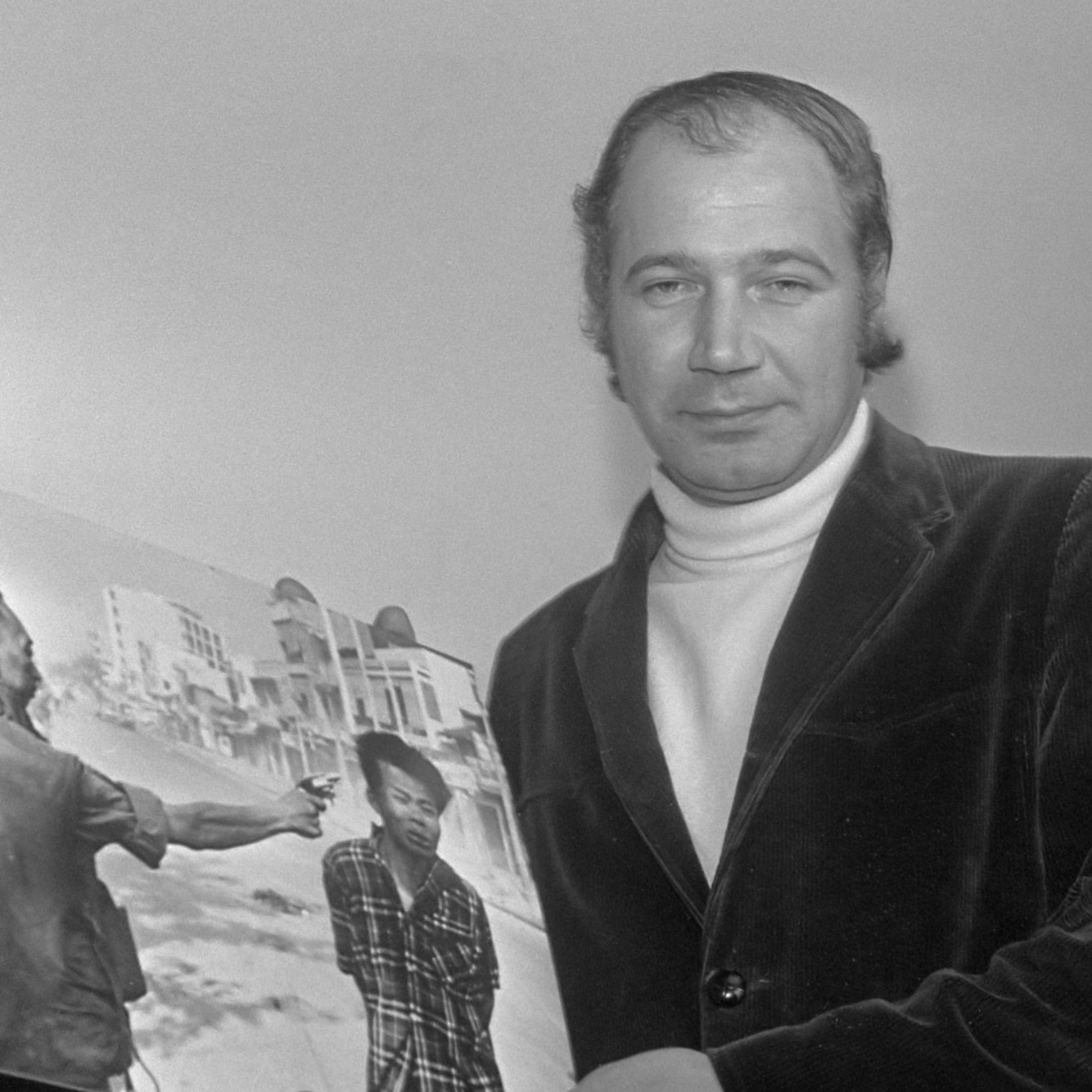
Eddie Adams with his photo in 1969

The photo came to haunt Adams: "I was getting money for showing one man killing another. Two lives were destroyed, and I was getting paid for it. I was a hero." He elaborated on this in a later piece of writing: "Two people died in that photograph. The general killed the Viet Cong; I killed the general with my camera."

Ben Wright, associate director for communications at the Dolph Briscoe Center for American History, said of the photo: "There's something in the nature of a still image that deeply affects the viewer and stays with them. The film footage of the shooting, while ghastly, doesn't evoke the same feelings of urgency and stark tragedy."

== Aftermath ==
Nguyễn Ngọc Loan continued to serve as Brigadier General and Chief of Police until he was wounded in action in May that year. In 1975, he fled South Vietnam during the Fall of Saigon, emigrating eventually to the United States. Pressure from the U.S. Congress resulted in an investigation by the Library of Congress, which concluded that Lém's execution was illegal under South Vietnamese law. In 1978, the Immigration and Naturalization Service (INS) contended that Loan had committed a war crime. They attempted to deport him, but President Jimmy Carter personally intervened to stop the proceedings, stating that "such historical revisionism was folly". Carter's staff explained that the president was concerned about how Loan would be treated back in Vietnam. Loan died on July 14, 1998, in Burke, Virginia, at the age of 67.

The sole survivor of the massacre of Tuân's family was Huan Nguyen; aged nine at the time, he was shot three times during the attack and stayed with his mother for two hours as she bled to death. In 2019, he became the highest-ranking Vietnamese-American officer in the U.S. military when he was promoted to the rank of rear admiral in the United States Navy, serving as the Deputy Commander for Cyber Engineering for the Naval Sea Systems Command.

In 2012, Douglas Sloan made a short movie, Saigon '68, about Adams' photograph. This movie details the influence it had on the lives of Adams and Loan, and on public opinion of the Vietnam War.

Saigon Story: Two Shootings in the Forest Kingdom, a 2026 documentary film by Kim Nguyen, explored the ways in which the photograph had indelibly impacted the families of its main subjects.

== See also ==
- The Terror of War, another influential photo from the Vietnam War
- Thích Quảng Đức, whose self-immolation during the war was photographed
- Jack Ruby Shoots Lee Harvey Oswald, another Pulitzer-winning photo of someone at the moment they were fatally shot
- List of photographs considered the most important
