= Douglas Sloan (filmmaker) =

American film director

Douglas J. Sloan is a filmmaker, and commercial director known for his documentaries on the lives and work of artists and photographers, such as Cindy Sherman, William Klein, Annie Leibovitz, Elliott Erwitt, William Eggleston, Helmut Newton, Diane Arbus and John G. Morris.

== Career and work ==
Over the course of a thirteen year partnership with the International Center of Photography Museum in New York, Sloan created over one hundred film profiles on photographers, artists, and writers for their annual Infinity Awards program. These include: Helmut Newton, Arnold Newman, William Eggleston, Diane Arbus, Thomas Ruff, Hiroshi Sugimoto, Don McCullin and James Nachtway,

Sloan's Elliott Erwitt: I Bark at Dogs won the Short Doc - Audience Award at the 2011 Austin Film Festival and was awarded Best Documentary at the Aspen Shortsfest in 2012. In 2011, Sloan and Erwitt attended a screening of the film during the Doc NYC festival at the IFC Center in Manhattan.

In 2012, Sloan completed a short documentary film titled Saigon '68. The film tells the little-known back story of photographer Eddie Adams's Pulitzer Prize winning photograph of General Nguyễn Ngọc Loan executing a Vietcong prisoner, Nguyễn Văn Lém, on a Saigon street, on February 1, 1968. Saigon '68 includes testimony from a number of figures, central to the reportage of the Vietnam War, including Hal Buell, Bill Eppridge, James S. Robbins, Richard Pyle, Walter Anderson, Morley Safer, Bob Schieffer, and Peter Arnett.

Sloan is the recipient of 24 CINE Awards for excellence in film.

He has also directed TV commercials and branded campaigns for the web. He has worked with JWT, on projects for Energizer and Macy's, bringing a documentary approach to commercial media. With production company Icontent, Sloan has filmed for Under Armour, Helzberg Diamonds, The Hollywood Reporter and Vaseline Men (a campaign featuring NFL Champion Michael Strahan).

He is developing a drama feature based on the life story of Eddie Adams.

== Filmography ==
- A Face to a Name (2002) – documentary examining victims who died in the September 11 attacks. Original music by Todd Rundgren
- William Klein Out of Necessity (2008)
- Annie Leibovitz So, There You Go (2009)
- John G. Morris: Eleven Frames (2010)
- Elliott Erwitt: I Bark at Dogs (2011)
- Saigon '68 (2012)
