= Inshallah (novel) =

1990 novel by Oriana Fallaci

In sha Allah
- First edition (Italian)
- Author: Oriana Fallaci
- Original title: Insciallah
- Translator: James Marcus and Oriana Fallaci
- Language: Italian
- Genre: Novel
- Publisher: Rizzoli
- Publication date: 1990
- Publication place: Italy, Lebanon
- Media type: Print
- Pages: 599
- ISBN: 978-0-385-41987-1
- OCLC: 25832918
- Dewey Decimal: 853/.914 20
- LC Class: PQ4866.A4 I5713 1992

In sha Allah or Inshallah (Italian: Insciallah [inʃalˈla]) is a real life based novel written by Oriana Fallaci chronicling the experiences of a fictional group of Italian soldiers on a 1983 peace keeping mission in Beirut. The novel draws heavily on Fallaci's own experiences of war, covering the Middle East as a war correspondent throughout the 1980s. It has been published in Italy by the editor Rizzoli in 1990. The title refers to the Arabic phrase إن شاء الله (ʾin šāʾa Llāh) that means "God willing" or "if Allah wills".

== Plot summary ==
The books switches from character to character, following Italian soldiers in Beirut, flashbacks of their lives before they came to the city, their Lebanese sweethearts, Lebanese Christian and Shi'ite militants, and a group of French nuns. If anyone could be called the protagonist of the story, it would be Angelo, a confused Italian soldier who abandoned his studies of mathematics in order to enlist as a conscript in the Italian army and see war first-hand. Angelo's interest in Mathematics is reflective of Fallaci's lover, the Greek politician and rebel Alexandros Panagoulis, who also studied mathematics at the Athens Polytechnion and attempted to prove mathematical theorems in his own blood whilst in jail.

But the real inspirer and leading actor of the novel is "Charlie", to which the author devotes many pages and between the lines attributed the success of the Italian contingent which left Lebanon unscathed. Charlie, a character of course inspired by Captain Corrado Cantatore (multi decorated just for his Lebanese exploits). Cantatore arrived in Lebanon many years before the Italian contingent, as a volunteer in the UN and was probably recruited by the famous Colonel Stefano Giovannone of Italian intelligence. Cantatore grew with Giovannone and when Giovannone left Lebanon, Cantatore had already woven his network that so impressed Oriana Fallaci and assured the safety to the Italians. The commanding Officer of the Italian Contingent, General Franco Angioni, before taking command of the expeditionary unit had served as Chief of Operations of the Army Staff, in charge of the Italian Military personnel serving in United Nations organizations (UNIFIL and UNTSO) in Middle East. Angioni was therefore aware of the peculiar capacity of the Captain Cantatore, and just landed off the ship in the Beirut harbor had given him the task of liaising with all Lebanese factions, under the cover of the press information officer. Cantatore received and accompanied all the journalists who visited the contingent and was the officer who spent more time overall with Oriana Fallaci who, struck by the extraordinary quality of the Captain, decided to spend the last night of the Italian Contingent in Lebanon in the office of Captain Cantatore (so called "Arab Bureau") with him. One last curiosity is that the code name "Charlie - Charlie" was born from the extraction of aeronautics of Cantatore (he was a pilot of fix wings and attack helicopters): at the arrival of the Italian Contingent, when Angioni asked to choose a Radio call sign distinct from those used in his headquarters (Condor, Eagle, Ruby, etc.). was natural for Cantatore take his initials, just CC, which was designed "Charlie - Charlie" in the NATO phonetic alphabet in use among the pilots and control towers. Cantatore, when returned from Lebanon disappeared from the scene, he was great friend of Oriana Fallaci, it seems, he has continued to work for the' Italian intelligence.

Angelo finds war not as he expected, and he is shocked at the irrationality and barbarity of the civil war engulfing Beirut. Whilst on guard duty, he meets Ninette, a beautiful Christian Lebanese woman with whom he cannot communicate as she pretends not to speak French for reasons unknown to Angelo. Still, they are attracted to each other and they begin a relationship. Angelo is tormented by the fact that their relationship is primarily physical, and also on his growing reliance on Ninette.

While expecting a visit from Ninette, Hizbollah bombs the American marine barracks as well as French paratroopers barracks. Angelo is ordered to photograph the rescue efforts of Italian soldiers, but he is too horrified by the carnage to accomplish the task. On the way back to purchases Ninette an anchor shaped cross with the Virgin Mary inscribed on it to apologize for missing their rendez-vous.

Subplots are developed between a group of Italian soldiers billeted in a Catholic monastery and the French nuns, as well as the negotiations between Italian officers and Shi'ite militia leaders.

Angelo's friend Gino, a gentle poet, is severely wounded by Khalid Passepartout, a vicious child soldier in the service of the Shi'ite militia "the Sons of God." Gino loses his fingers, and can no longer write poetry. Angelo vows revenge, and during an encounter with Ninette he leaves early to visit Gino in the hospital and tells her that he cannot spend Christmas with her due to Gino's condition. He admits to her that friendship is more important than love to him, and this hurts Ninette who expresses to him in a letter, written in perfect French, that she can no longer see him. Angleo realizes how much he loves Ninette and vainly searches for her throughout the city.

French paratroopers vacating a tower in the center of Beirut causes fighting to break out between Amal, a Shi'ite militia and mainly Christian government forces. In the turmoil Passpartout sees Ninette, who he sees in the street after she goes to the Italian post to see if Angelo is all right, and gives her his Kalashnikov, as he wants to run away. After being chastised by his officer and pedophilic lover, Rashid, he returns to Ninette demanding that his gun be returned and accusing her of theft. Despite warnings from passers-by that she will be killed if she returns the gun as she is a Christian, she returns the gun and Passepartout shoots her shouting "Christian! Whore! Spy!" Ninette is buried in a mass grave.

Angelo's officer finds out the news, and tells Angelo who is shattered. Angelo again vows revenge, and whilst on guard duty he encounters Passepartout who is wearing Gino's bersaglieri helmet. Through a discussion, Angelo forgives Passepartout for killing his friend as he is only a child, but then rather than running away Passepartout attempts to sell Angelo an anchor shaped cross with the Virgin Mary on it. Angelo recognizes that this was the cross that he had given Ninette. In a fit of rage Angelo realizes that Passepartout killed not only his friend, but his lover, and Angelo kills Passepartout.

Rashid finds out that an Italian killed his lover, Passepartout, and vows vengeance. He plans a suicided bombing against the Italian's boats as they plan to leave. The Italian commanders struggle to strike a deal with the Shi'ite militia to avert catastrophe. Angelo discovers by chance in a magazine that Ninette was really an elegant Lebanese woman named Natalia Narakat who had been married to an assassinated political leader, who looked quite a bit like Angelo which is what attracted her to him in the first place. In the interview she states that the meaning of life is contained in the word "in sha Allah"-- "as God wills"—there is no rationality, no way to predict the future, just a series of events that are all interlocking but completely incomprehensible when viewed above from human eyes. Angelo is deeply moved and abandons his quest to formulate life in mathematical terms.

The French nuns who quartered the Italian troops are raped and murdered by Shi'ite militiamen, who desecrate their church. The novel ends with the Italians departing after striking a deal with a Shi'ite cleric for their safety in exchange for supplies. The Shi'ite promise to give the alcohol and pork to Christian Lebanese, but instead they destroy it. In the final scene Angelo looks across the prow of the boat and sees Rashid's motorboat speeding towards the Italian convoy.

== Themes ==
Boltzmann's equation for entropy is heavily featured in the book, seen as a mathematical formula for the seemingly irrational chaos enfolding in Beirut. Mathematics are also heavily discussed throughout the book. In the end they are discredited by a single word-- "In sha Allah"--"As God Wills" which Ninette states is the very essence of our complex and irrational lives.

The characters of Bilal and Captain Ghassan represent the division of Lebanon. Bilal is a poor, semi-literate Shi'ite street sweeper who has eight children, whereas Ghassan is a wealthy Christian medical student turned officer with two children. Bilal fights for the creation of an Islamic state, whereas Ghassan was drawn into the conflict after the murder of his father by Muslim extremists who then razed his family's seaside villa. Ghassan eventually kills Bilal.

The irrationality of the conflict in Lebanon is expounded upon. Change and the impact of seemingly unimportant events also feature heavily in the story. For example, Italian soldiers purchasing an inflatable sex doll drastically alters the course of events.

Religion also features prominently in the novel. Many of the soldiers draw comfort from their beliefs, and the soft, peaceful Christianity of the Italians is juxtaposed against the "Olympian" Christianity of the Lebanese, who pray to the Virgin of Junieh that they might slay many enemies. Islam is attacked somewhat in the novel, as Mohammed is portrayed as abusive to women.

== Quotes ==
"Maybe he couldn't bear the dejection of having proved a fact that even newborns divine, the invincibility of death, and out of consistency he surrendered to it before his time. Or maybe he concluded that, besides constituting the inevitable goal of every thing and every creature, Death is a relief: a repose. And out of impatience, or out of exhaustion, he ran up to it. Could I imitate him? Well, though I can't deny that sometimes Death offers repose or relief, though what we think and desire today doesn't usually correspond to what we'll think or desire tomorrow because every tomorrow is a trap of ugly surprises, my answer is no. I don't think I could run up to Death for impatience or exhaustion. Unless... No, no... I'll never yield, I'll never bend, to its invincibility. I'm too certain that Life is the measure of all, the mainspring of all, the goal of all. And I hate Death too much. I hate it as much as I hate solitude, suffering, pain and the word goodbye.."
