= A Man =

A Man may refer to:

- A Man (Fallaci novel), a 1979 biographical novel by Oriana Fallaci
- A Man (Hirano novel), a 2018 novel by Keiichiro Hirano
- A Man (film), a 2022 Japanese film, based on the Hirano novel
- A Man, pen name of Horace Walpole, English politician and writer
