= Eddie Adams Workshop =

Annual photojournalism workshop in New York

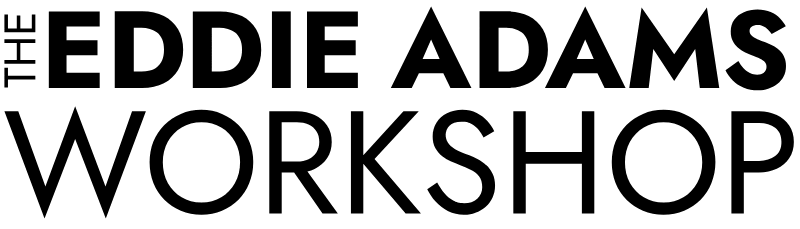
- Nickname: Barnstorm
- Formation: 1988
- Founder: Eddie Adams; Alyssa Adams
- Type: Photojournalism workshop
- Headquarters: Jeffersonville, New York, U.S.
- Executive director: Alyssa Adams
- Website: eddieadamsworkshop.org

The Eddie Adams Workshop, also known as Barnstorm, is a tuition-free photojournalism workshop held each October in Jeffersonville, New York. It was founded in 1988 by Pulitzer Prize winning photographer Eddie Adams and his wife, Alyssa Adams, and has continued annually since his death in 2004. Each year, 100 emerging photographers are selected based on the strength of their portfolios to spend four days working alongside prominent photographers and picture editors.

In 2012, Time wrote that many consider it the premier photojournalism workshop in the United States. By its 30th anniversary in 2017, close to 3,000 photographers had attended. In 2018, a Columbia Journalism Review investigation into sexual harassment in photojournalism reported that women said the workshop had ignored complaints of harassment; the workshop subsequently adopted a code of conduct and other reforms.

== History ==
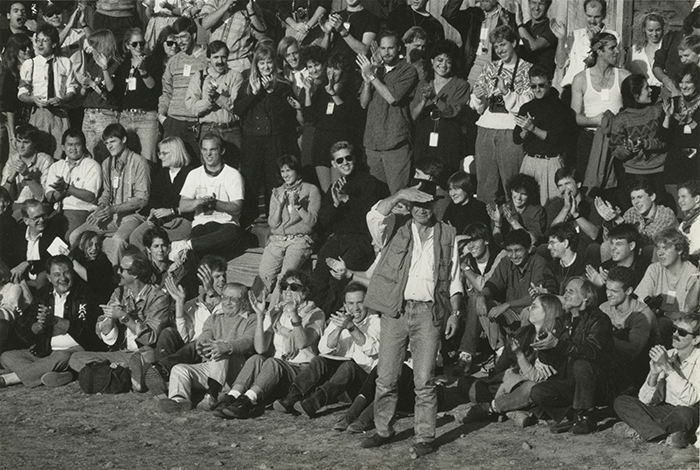
Adams, students, and staff in 1988

Adams conceived of the workshop after attending dozens of photography seminars during his career, imagining a "foto farm" where leading photographers could share their work with talented young photographers chosen on merit rather than their ability to pay. For the first workshop in 1988, held over Columbus Day weekend at his farm in upstate New York, he invited Nikon, Kodak and a dozen publications as partners, and received more than 1,000 student applications. The program was designed to be inspiration-based rather than instructional, with professionals donating their time and admission based on portfolio quality.

Photographer Gordon Parks served as the workshop's honorary chairman, and early faculty and speakers included Joe Rosenthal, Carl Mydans, Cornell Capa, Nick Ut, John H. White and Adams himself. The workshop's volunteer staff, known as the "Black Team", was formally organized in 1992. The first all-digital team, led by White, was formed in 1995, and by 2004 all teams were shooting digitally.

After Adams died in 2004, the workshop continued under the direction of Alyssa Adams, its co-founder and executive director. The New York Times marked the workshop's 25th anniversary in 2012 and covered it again on its 30th anniversary in 2017, when The Washington Post also published reflections from nine alumni.

== Format ==
The workshop takes place over four days each October at the farm in Jeffersonville, in the Catskill Mountains of Sullivan County. One hundred early-career photographers are divided into ten teams of ten, each led by a photographer, an editor and a producer who assign and edit their work over the weekend. In addition to shooting assignments, students attend presentations by industry figures and receive late-night portfolio reviews from editors, and on the final evening each team presents its images to the workshop community. Exceptional student work is recognized with awards that include assignments, grants and equipment.

The all-volunteer faculty has included photographers and editors from The New York Times, National Geographic, the Associated Press, Getty Images, The Washington Post, ESPN and Reuters. The workshop is free to attend and is supported by corporate sponsors, with Nikon providing chief support during its first three decades.

== Alumni ==
Workshop alumni have gone on to prominent careers in photojournalism. According to the Dolph Briscoe Center for American History, which houses Adams's photographic archive, the workshop's graduates include twelve Pulitzer Prize winners. Alumni profiled by The Washington Post on the workshop's 30th anniversary included Andrea Bruce, Stephanie Sinclair, Erika Larsen, Jahi Chikwendiu, Adrees Latif, David Furst, John Moore, Preston Gannaway and Clarence Williams. Many alumni return to the workshop in later years as team leaders, editors and producers.

== Sexual harassment allegations and response ==
In July 2018, a special report by Kristen Chick in the Columbia Journalism Review on sexual harassment in photojournalism reported that women interviewed said the Eddie Adams Workshop had ignored complaints of harassment, and described how workshops and portfolio reviews for young photographers had been exploited by older, established members of the industry. Photo District News noted that an earlier open letter by photographers Daniel Sircar and Justin Cook had called on the workshop to "lead by example" in preventing harassment, and reported that organizers had instituted a code of conduct before the 2017 workshop but told CJR they had not yet established a procedure for handling harassment complaints. NPR reported in September 2018 that the workshop had responded to the investigation by implementing a code of conduct. The workshop later added a reporting and review process for violence, harassment and discrimination, harassment training for onsite staff, and changes to the program schedule.
