= Letter to a Child Never Born =

1975 novel by Oriana Fallaci

- First US edition
- Author: Oriana Fallaci
- Original title: Lettera a un bambino mai nato
- Translator: John Shepley
- Language: Italian
- Publisher: Rizzoli (Italy); Simon and Schuster (US); Arlington Books (UK)
- Publication date: 1975 (Italian)
- Publication place: Italy
- English publication date: 1976 (English)
- Media type: Print (Book)
- Pages: 114
- ISBN: 0-671-22374-7
- OCLC: 2493634
- Dewey Decimal: 858/.9/1407
- LC Class: PZ4.F192 Le PQ4866.A4

Letter to a Child Never Born (Italian: Lettera a un bambino mai nato, 1975) is a novel by Italian author and journalist Oriana Fallaci. It is written as a letter by a young professional woman (presumably Fallaci herself) to the fetus she carries in utero; it details the woman's struggle to choose between a career she loves and an unexpected pregnancy, explaining how life works with examples of her childhood, and warning him/her about the unfairness of the world. The English translation was first published in 1976.

The book sold four million copies worldwide.
