= The Force of Reason =

2004 book by Oriana Fallaci

- Author: Oriana Fallaci
- Original title: La forza della ragione
- Language: Italian
- Genre: Non-fiction
- Published: 5 April 2004
- Publisher: Rizzoli
- Publication place: Italy
- Pages: 307

The Force of Reason (La forza della ragione) is a 2004 book by Oriana Fallaci. The book is a follow-up to The Rage and the Pride, aimed at her public critics, accusations of racism, and the lawsuits and death-threats launched against her. The book became a bestseller, selling 800,000 copies in Italy alone.

== Content ==
In the book, Fallaci states that Islam "presents a threat to the very existence of Western civilization, of conscience, of toleration, of liberalism–a message which is summed up in an epigram she quotes from the 18th century philosophe Diderot: “Islam is the enemy of Reason.”" She also compares herself to the enlightened Florentine scholar, Mastro Cecco, who in 1327 ran afoul of the local authorities and was then turned over to the Inquisition whereafter he was "tortured, and asked to recant his ideas, but because he cannot declare false what he believes to be true, he is condemned to be burnt alive in the public square, along with all his books and writings."

She notes that the modern inquisitors "have devised subtle and insidious ways to go after the soul. With the help of newspapers, TV, public schools, colleges, and universities, they have developed a diabolical technique in which it is no longer necessary to engage in debate with those who disagree with their own party-line; it is enough simply to destroy the public character of their opponents, either by outright slander, or by insinuations of insanity. Or, worse, to intimidate them into obsequious silence with the threat of criminal charges, and even with the threat of death itself."

About Islam, Fallaci is not most concerned about terrorism, but "the cultural war, the demographic war, the religious war waged by stealing a country from its citizens…the war waged through immigration, fertility, presumed pluriculturalism," as well as "the refusal of European leaders to recognize what is at stake in this war, and their complicity in exempting Muslim immigrants from the first duty any immigrant has to his new homeland, namely, the duty to fit into his new culture, and to play by its rules."

== Reception ==
A legal case was initiated against Fallaci in Italy by Adel Smith, president of the Muslim Union of Italy, on grounds that the book contained expressions that were "unequivocally offensive to Islam".

In a review for National Review, Lee Harris wrote that "one is bound to come away with a troubling sense of the fragility, if not the immense vulnerability of reason." He writes that as in The Rage and the Pride, Fallaci has "one searing message to bring us, and she delivers it with breath-taking disregard for political correctness," and concludes that "ultimately, if reason has any force, it is due to the examples of men and women, like Mastro Cecco and Oriana Fallaci, who have given force to reason through their own uncompromising commitment to it."

In a more critical review, Ira Stoll, writing for The New York Sun, claims that Fallaci "strains the good will of even the most sympathetic reader." According to Stoll, "The more serious problem is the sweeping nature of her condemnation of Islam and Muslims. She faults them for the fact that "they breed like rats"; for requiring their meat to be slaughtered in a "barbaric" manner she says is similar to kosher butchery; for having their own schools, hospitals, and cemeteries; for immigrating; and for wanting accommodation of their religious holidays and Sabbath in schools and workplaces."

The book describes in detail the Eurabia theory associated with Bat Ye'or, and has been considered one of Fallaci's books in the "Eurabia genre".
