= Adel Smith =

Italian Muslim activist and controversial figure (1960–2014)

Adel Smith (March 9, 1960 – August 22, 2014), born Emilio Smith in Alexandria, Egypt, was an Italian Muslim known for his radical stances and often accused of fundamentalism. He was the son of a Naples-born Italian architect of Scottish descent and an Egyptian woman. Smith relocated to Italy as a child and later made a living as a translator for Arabic-speaking tourists in Rome. Raised as a Catholic, he eventually converted to Islam. He later relocated to Albania, where he worked as a printer, before coming back to Italy and settling in the village of Ofena.

Adel Smith founded the Union of Italian Muslims (Unione dei musulmani d'Italia), claiming it to be the most representative Italian Muslim association. Critics of Smith, however, contend that his association numbers very few members. He came to preeminence in the Italian media when he requested that a crucifix be removed from Ofena's elementary school, where his son was a student. He was subsequently a regular guest on Italian media venues, where he vehemently attacked Western civilization and Christianity. In 2001, he founded the Italian Islamic Party (Partito Islamico Italiano).

He attracted more media attention by demanding that crucifixes in public places (e.g., schools, hospitals, and government offices) be removed, and throwing a crucifix out of the window of his mother's hospital room after authorities refused to remove it. The Italian Council of State, with the sentence number 556 of 13 February 2006, upheld the display of the crucifix in government-sponsored spaces. Smith was subsequently charged with defaming the Catholic religion in 2006 and sentenced to eight months in prison.

He attempted to sue author Oriana Fallaci in April 2004, saying that her book The Force of Reason was offensive to Islam.

Mainstream Italian Muslim organizations expressed discomfort over the fact that Smith was treated by the Italian media as if he had been a genuine Muslim leader.

In 2011 he was sentenced to five years in prison for fraud and forgery of checks.

Smith died on August 22, 2014, at the age of 54 in L'Aquila.
