= Nothing, and So Be It =

1972 book

Nothing, and So Be It Nothing and amen
- Front cover page of the book.
- Author: Oriana Fallaci
- Language: English
- Publisher: Michael Joseph
- Publication date: 1969
- Publication place: United States
- Pages: 322
- ISBN: 978-0718109509

Nothing, and So Be It (Italian: Niente e così sia) is a first-hand account book by Italian journalist Oriana Fallaci about a year as a war correspondent in Saigon, Vietnam, between 1967 and 1968. It was first published in Italian in 1969. Fallaci based the book on the testimony of several American soldiers who participated in the Mỹ Lai massacre and the reports of some of the survivors. She received the Bancarella Prize (1970) for the book.

== Author ==
Oriana Fallaci was an Italian journalist and author. A partisan during World War II, she had a long and successful journalistic career. Fallaci became famous worldwide for her coverage of war and revolution, and her "long, aggressive and revealing interviews" with many world leaders during the 1960s, 1970s, and 1980s. Her book Interview with History contains interviews with Indira Gandhi, Golda Meir, Yasser Arafat, Zulfikar Ali Bhutto, Willy Brandt, Shah of Iran Mohammad Reza Pahlavi, and Henry Kissinger, South Vietnamese President Nguyễn Văn Thiệu, and North Vietnamese General Võ Nguyên Giáp during the Vietnam War. The interview with Kissinger was published in Playboy.

== Content ==
The book in diary format is the story of one year of the author's life as a war correspondent for L'Europeo in Saigon, Vietnam, between 1967 and 1968 with the photographer Gianfranco Moroldo. This book was created as reflection on her little sister's question, "What is life?". Fallaci based the book on interviews with some protagonists of the war, soldiers of the National Liberation Front, and soldiers of the United States Army soldiers; reports of two diaries of two North Vietnamese soldiers, one unknown and the other Le Vanh Minh, both dead. The book begins with the testimony of some American soldiers who participated in the Mỹ Lai massacre and the testimony of some of the survivors.

== Awards ==
In 1970, Fallaci was awarded the Bancarella Prize for Niente e così sia.

== Translation ==
In 1972, the book was translated into English and published by Michael Joseph under the name Nothing and amen, and by Doubleday under the name Nothing, and So Be It.

The book was translated into Persian by Lili Golestan and published by Amir Kabir Publishers.

== See also ==
- Vietnam War
- United States war crimes
