= Alyssa Adams =

American writer

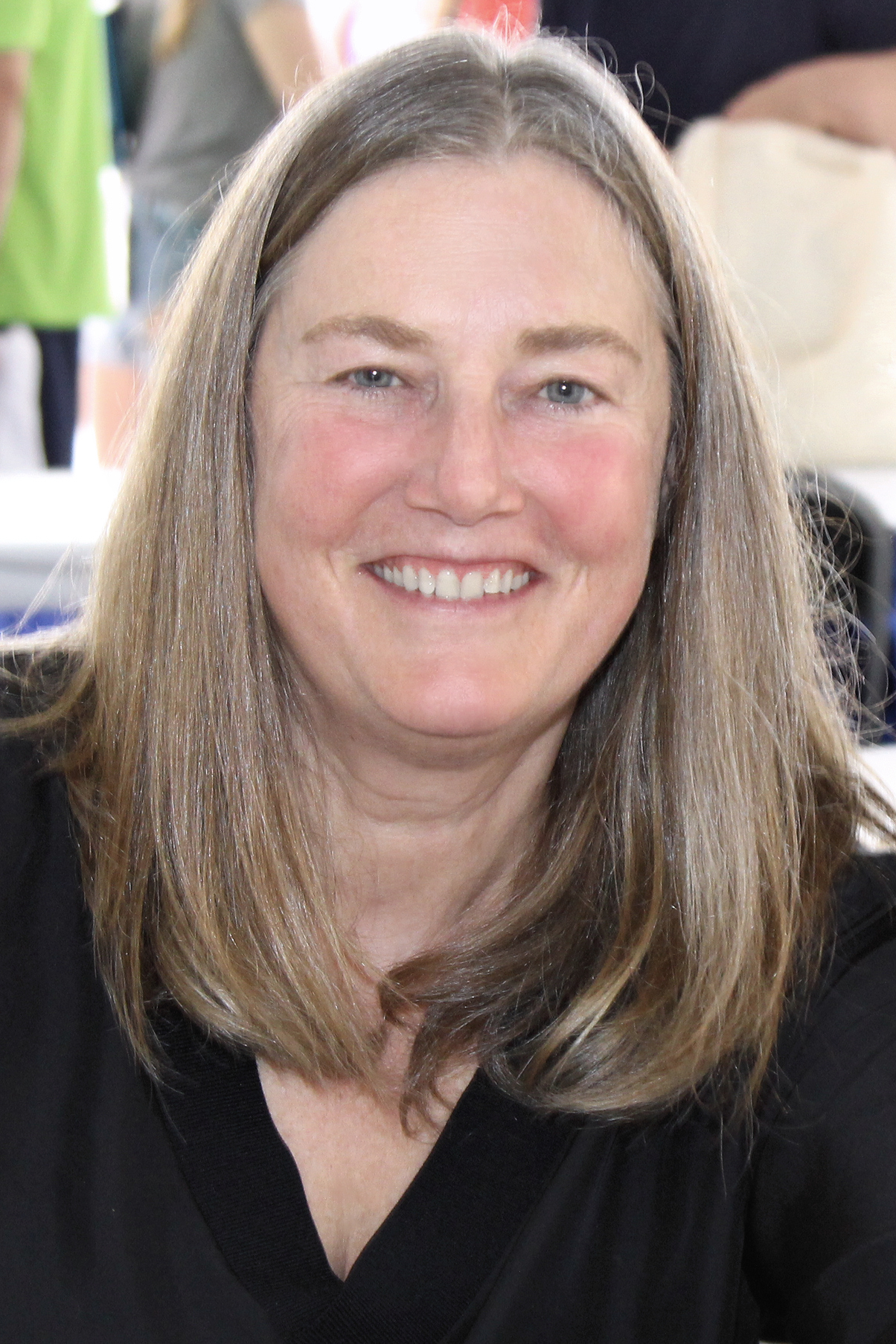
- Adams at the 2017 Texas Book Festival
- Born: Alyssa Adkins
- Occupations: Photo Editor and Author
- Known for: Co-founder of The Eddie Adams Workshop
- Spouse: Eddie Adams (m. 1989; died 2004)
- Children: one son

Alyssa Adams (née Adkins) is the co-founder of the Eddie Adams Workshop, author, editor and a photo editor of TV Guide.

== Career ==
Alyssa Adams is the co-founder and executive director of the Eddie Adams Workshop. She and her husband, photographer Eddie Adams, founded the workshop in 1988. The Eddie Adams Workshop is a four-day-long, free workshop located in Jeffersonville, New York for 100 photography professionals who are chosen based on their previous work and portfolios.

Adams is an author and editor. She wrote the text for a book based on her husband's career, titled Eddie Adams: Vietnam, written in 2008. The book mainly focuses on his photographs from the Vietnam War and the awards and outcomes that followed those photos.

She is the Deputy Photo Editor of TV Guide, and the director of operations at Bathhouse Studios, a photo rental space in New York City founded in 2004.

Adams was a graphic designer for Carbone Smolan Agency and the director of photography at Miramax Films.

== Publications ==
- Eddie Adams: Vietnam. New York City: Umbrage, 2008. Written and edited by Alyssa Adams. ISBN 978-1884167966. A monograph of Eddie Adams' work from Vietnam.
