= Erika Larsen =

American writer

- Born: Washington, D.C
- Education: Rochester Institute of Technology
- Occupation: Storyteller

Erika Larsen (born 1976) is a transdisciplinary storyteller and photographer who is known for her intimate essays about cultures that maintain strong connections with nature. She immerses readers in cultures through her visual storytelling.

== Life ==
Erika Larsen grew up in Washington, D.C. Her father was one of the designers of the Hubble Space Telescope. Strongly moved by the Hubble images, Larsen picked a technical university to hone her photography skills, and become a storyteller in the process.

Between 1994 and 1999, Larsen received a B.F.A in Photographic Illustration and a M.F.A. in Computer Graphics and Film/Video from the Rochester Institute of Technology in New York. She began working professionally as a magazine photographer in 2000, specializing in human-interest stories.

== Work ==
Erika Larsen's work uses photography, video and writing to learn about cultures. She seeks to explore our human connection to the natural world, as these are expressed through culturally unique elements, including ritual, spirituality, language, adornments and customs, and family and world views.

One of Larsen's specific interest areas, hunting, took her to the Scandinavian Arctic in 2007. This led to her first National Geographic assignment. While working on her four-year photography project among the Sámi, Erika chose to live as a "beaga," a housekeeper for the reindeer herding family of Nils Peder and Ingrid Gaup while photographing in Norway and Sweden. The Sámi people, who live in the Arctic region of northern Scandinavia and Russia. From that intimate vantage point, she was able to immerse herself in the culture, language, and land of the northern Sámi. Her first monograph (a detailed written study of a specialized subject or aspect of it), "Samí: Walking With A Reindeer," was released in 2013.

Larsen traveled to many locations in the United States to learn about the significance of the horse in Native American tribes – culturally, spiritually, and economically. Her photographs were featured in the March 2014 issue of National Geographic.

In 2018, Erika Larsen took part in a National Geographic traveling exhibition and publication titled "Women of Vision," commemorating the 125th anniversary of the magazine. A tribute to the spirit and ambition of these forward-thinking and distinguished female photographers and underscores the momentous work they have done to bring narratives from all over the world to the pages of National Geographic and into the homes of millions of people. The exhibition underscores National Geographic's history of documenting the world through photography and its ongoing commitment to supporting photographers as important and innovative storytellers who can make a difference with their work.

She was a National Geographic Society Fellow exploring the landscape of the Americas in relation to the animals and natural resources which are interpreting our current environment.

== Awards ==
- 2008: Fulbright Fellowship
- 2008: World Press Award
- New Jersey State Arts Council Fellowship
