= The Rage and the Pride =

2001 book by Oriana Fallaci

- Author: Oriana Fallaci
- Original title: La Rabbia e l'orgoglio
- Language: Italian
- Genre: Non-fiction
- Published: 2001
- Publisher: Rizzoli
- Publication place: Italy
- Pages: 187
- ISBN: 0-8478-2504-3

The Rage and the Pride (La Rabbia e l'orgoglio) is a book released by Oriana Fallaci in 2001. The book accuses the West of being blind to the true threat of Islam, and was written in New York City in the weeks following the September 11 attacks. The controversial book became a bestseller, selling over one million copies in Italy and 500,000 in the rest of Europe, becoming number one on non-fiction bestseller lists in France and Germany.

== Content ==
In the book, Fallaci likens Islam to a "mountain which in one thousand and four hundred years has not moved, has not risen from the abyss of its blindness, has not opened its doors to the conquests of civilization, has never wanted to know about freedom and democracy and progress. In short, has not changed."

Fallaci translated both the French and the English versions herself.

== Reception ==
In France, the Movement Against Racism and for Friendship Between People tried to get the book banned, but the request was rejected in court. In Italy, a booklet titled "Islam Punishes Oriana Fallaci", written by the president of the Italian Islamic Party, called for Muslims to "go and die with Fallaci." Fallaci consequently sued the author for slander and instigation to murder.

Christopher Caldwell described the book in Commentary magazine as "a philippic against Islamist terrorism and the cowardly Western elites who have permitted to blossom in their midst," that "for all her book's flaws, Fallaci is far more often right than wrong," and that "there can be no question that Fallaci is correct to say that some of the most extreme Islamist figures live in the West."

George Jonas, writing for UPI agreed with Caldwell, but criticised Fallaci's equation of Islamism with Islam. Jonas however wrote that Fallaci "is on solid grounds when she talks about Western elites. It's hard to disagree with her, for instance, that the statist bureaucracy emerging from Brussels and calling itself the European Union "is not Europe. It is the suicide of Europe."" He concluded that "when people of good taste and good judgment are afraid to speak up, they abandon the field to people of greater courage, if less taste and judgment. Enter Ms. Fallaci."

Fallaci herself attributed the success of her book to having put the finger on the nerve of Muslim immigration, "which grows and grows without inserting itself in our way of life, without accepting our way of life and, on the contrary, trying to impose on us its way of life," claiming that "people in Europe are so exasperated by the arrogance of most of these ‘invaders’ and being blackmailed with the unfair term ‘racist’ when they protest, that there was a kind of thirst for a book like this."

The book has retrospectively been considered one of Fallaci's books in the "Eurabia genre", being followed-up by The Force of Reason.
