= Interview with History =

Book by Italian journalist Oriana Fallaci (1973)

- First edition
- Author: Oriana Fallaci
- Original title: Intervista con la storia
- Translator: John Shepley
- Language: Italian
- Genre: Interviews
- Published: 1973
- Publication place: Italy
- Media type: Print (Hardback & Paperback)
- Pages: 376
- ISBN: 0-395-25223-7

Interview with History (Intervista con la storia in Italian) is a book of interviews by the Italian journalist and author Oriana Fallaci (1929–2006), one of the most controversial interviewers of her time.

Interviews with fourteen world leaders appeared in the book in order:

- Henry Kissinger
- Ngyen Van Thieu
- General Giap
- Golda Meir
- Yasser Arafat
- Hussein of Jordan
- Indira Gandhi
- Ali Bhutto
- Willy Brandt
- Pietro Nenni
- Mohammed Riza Pahlavi
- Helder Camara
- Archbishop Makarios
- Alexandros Panagoulis

== Publishing history ==
- Intervista con la storia, Milan: Rizzoli, 1973; reprinted Milan: Rizzoli, 1974 (Biblioteca Universale Rizzoli).
- Interview With History, New York: Liveright Publishing Corporation, 1976, translated from the Italian into English by John Shepley; first British edition: London: Michael Joseph, 1976; reprinted Boston: Houghton Mifflin Company, 1977, ISBN 0-395-25223-7.
- Expanded and revised Italian edition: Intervista con la storia nuova edizione ampliata e riveduta, Milano: Biblioteca Universale Rizzoli, 1985.
