= Eddie Adams (photographer) =

American photographer (1933–2004)

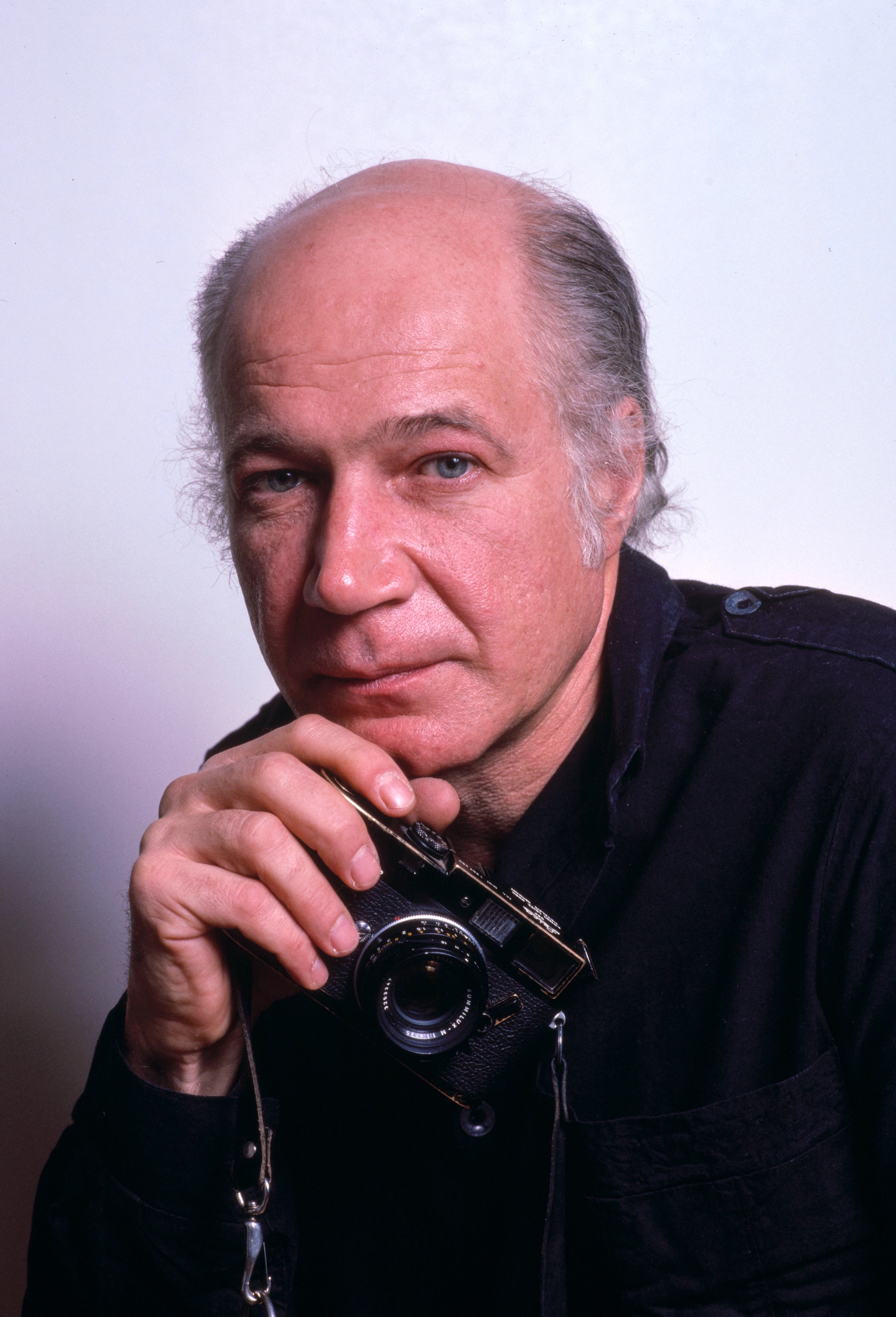
- Adams in 1985
- Born: Edward Thomas Adams; June 12, 1933; New Kensington, Pennsylvania, U.S.
- Died: September 19, 2004 (aged 71); New York City, U.S.
- Occupation: Photo journalist
- Spouses: Ann Fedorchak (divorced) Alyssa Adkins (m. 1989)
- Children: 4
- Awards: Pulitzer Prize for Spot News Photography (1969)

Edward Thomas Adams (June 12, 1933 – September 19, 2004) was an American photographer and photojournalist noted for portraits of celebrities and politicians and for coverage of 13 wars. He is best known for his photograph of the execution of Nguyễn Văn Lém, a Viet Cong prisoner of war, for which he won the Pulitzer Prize for Spot News Photography in 1969. Adams was a longtime resident of Bogota, New Jersey.

== Early life ==
Edward Thomas Adams was born on June 12, 1933, in New Kensington, Pennsylvania.

== Career ==
=== Early ===
Adams joined the United States Marine Corps in 1951, during the Korean War as a combat photographer. One of his assignments was to photograph the entire Demilitarized Zone from end to end immediately following the war. This took him more than a month to complete.

=== Pulitzer Prize–winning photograph ===
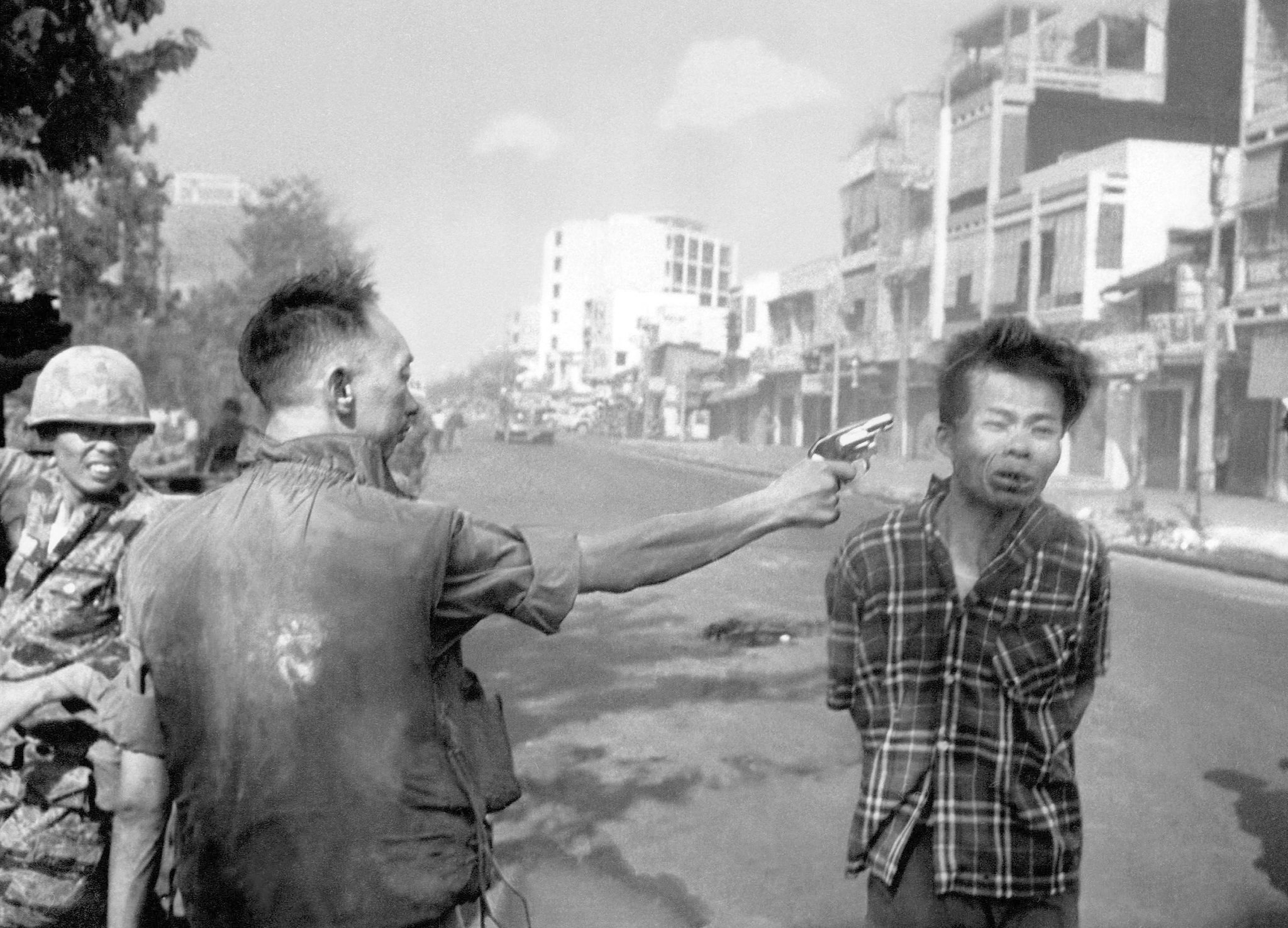
Adams' photograph of Nguyễn Ngọc Loan executing Nguyễn Văn Lém on February 1, 1968

It was while covering the Vietnam War for the Associated Press that he took his best-known photograph—that of police chief General Nguyễn Ngọc Loan, summarily executing Nguyễn Văn Lém, a Vietcong prisoner of war. This occurred on a Saigon street on February 1, 1968, during the early part of the Tet Offensive.

Adams won the 1969 Pulitzer Prize for Spot News Photography and a World Press Photo award for the photograph. Writer and critic David D. Perlmutter states that "no film footage did as much damage as AP photographer Eddie Adams's 35mm shot taken on a Saigon street ... When people talk or write about [the Tet Offensive] at least a sentence is devoted (often with an illustration) to the Eddie Adams picture".

Anticipating the effect of Adams's photograph, an attempt at balance was sought by editors at The New York Times. In his memoirs, John G. Morris recalls that assistant managing editor Theodore M. Bernstein "determined that the brutality manifested by America's ally be put into perspective, agreed to run the Adams picture large, but offset with a picture of a child slain by Vietcong, which conveniently came through from AP at about the same time." Adams' picture, however, retained a more lasting infamy. Max Hastings, writing in 2018, accused Lém of murdering Colonel Nguyen Tuân, his wife, six children, and 80-year-old mother; he also wrote that American historian Ed Moise "is convinced that the entire story of Lém murdering the Tuân family is a post-war invention" and that "The truth will never be known".

In Regarding the Pain of Others (2003), Susan Sontag was disturbed by what she saw as Loan's staging of the execution in the street for journalists' photographs. She wrote that "he would not have carried out the summary execution there had they [journalists] not been available to witness it" and positioned himself in profile view with the prisoner facing the cameras. However, Donald Winslow of The New York Times quoted Adams as having described the image as a "reflex picture" and "wasn't certain of what he'd photographed until the film was developed". Furthermore, Winslow noted that Adams "wanted me to understand that 'Saigon Execution' was not his most important picture and that he did not want his obituary to begin, 'Eddie Adams, the photographer best known for his iconic Vietnam photograph "Saigon Execution"'".

Adams would later lament the effect of the photo. On Loan and his photograph, Adams wrote in Time in 1998:

Two people died in that photograph: the recipient of the bullet and General Nguyen Ngoc Loan. The general killed the Viet Cong; I killed the general with my camera. Still photographs are the most powerful weapons in the world. People believe them; but photographs do lie, even without manipulation. They are only half-truths. ... What the photograph didn't say was, "What would you do if you were the general at that time and place on that hot day, and you caught the so-called bad guy after he blew away one, two or three American people?". ... This picture really messed up his life. He never blamed me. He told me if I hadn't taken the picture, someone else would have, but I've felt bad for him and his family for a long time. ... I sent flowers when I heard that he had died and wrote, "I'm sorry. There are tears in my eyes."

Loan later relocated to the United States, and in 1978, there was an unsuccessful attempt to rescind his permanent residence status (green card). Adams advocated for Loan when the U.S. government sought to deport him based on the photograph, and apologized in person to Loan and his family for the irreparable damage it did to his honor while he was alive. When Loan died, Adams praised him as a "hero" of a "just cause". On the television show War Stories with Oliver North Adams referred to Loan as "a goddamned hero!"

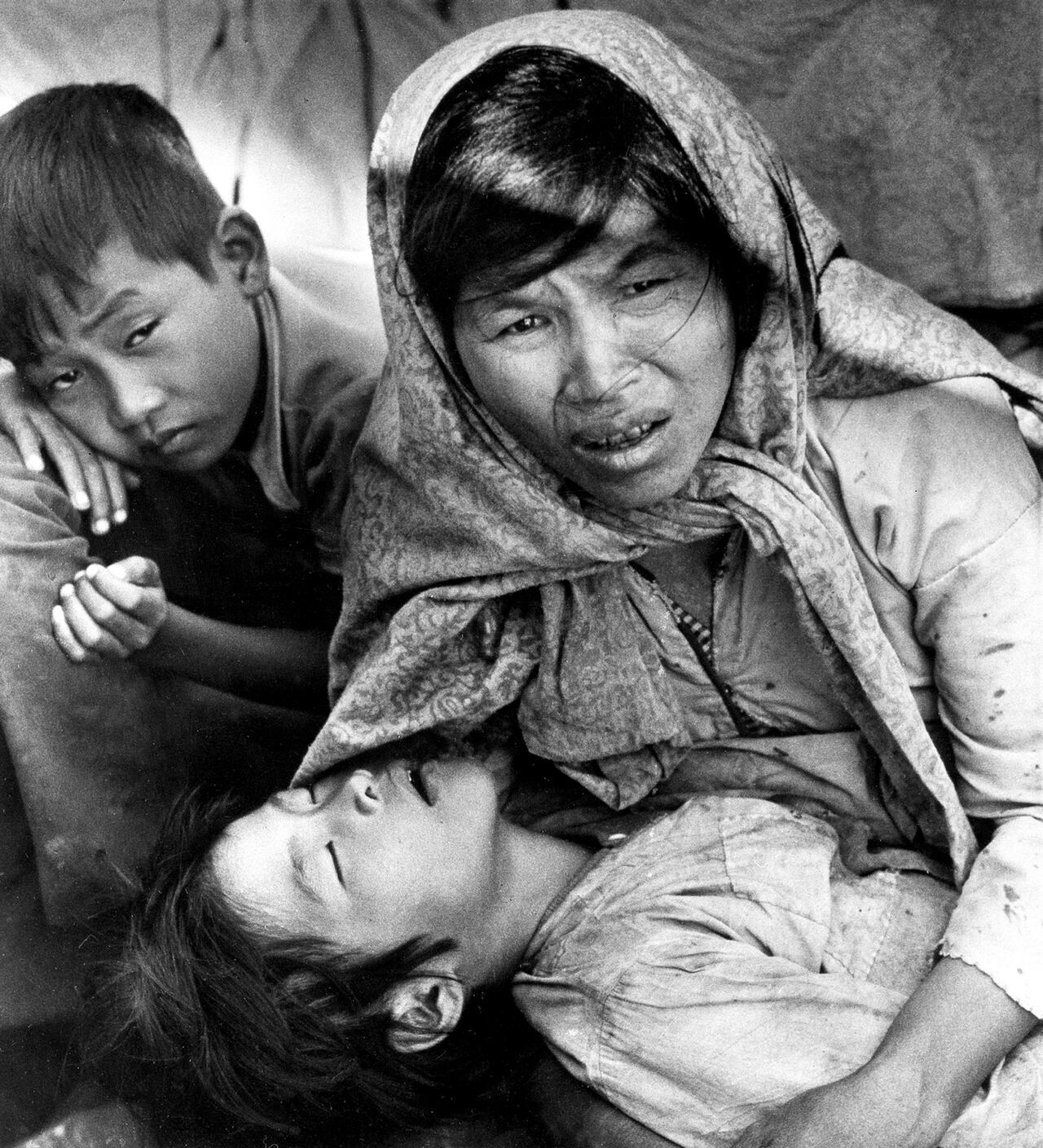
An image from "Boat of No Smiles", listed by Time as one of the most important photographs

He once said, "I would have rather been known more for the series of photographs I shot of 48 Vietnamese refugees who managed to sail to Thailand in a 30-foot boat, only to be towed back to the open seas by Thai marines." The photographs, and accompanying reports, helped persuade then President Jimmy Carter to grant asylum to the nearly 200,000 Vietnamese boat people. He won the Robert Capa Gold Medal from the Overseas Press Club in 1977 for this series of photographs in his photo-essay, "Boat of No Smiles" (published by AP). Adams remarked, "It did some good and nobody got hurt".

On October 22, 2009, Swann Galleries auctioned a print of Adams' photo of Loan and Lém. Printed during the 1980s, it had been a gift to Adams's son. It sold for $43,200.

The sole survivor of Lém's alleged killing of Tuan's family was Huan Nguyen; aged nine at the time, he was shot twice during the attack that killed his family and stayed with his mother for two hours as she bled to death. In 2019, he became the highest ranking Vietnamese American officer in the U.S. military when he was promoted to the rank of rear admiral in the United States Navy.

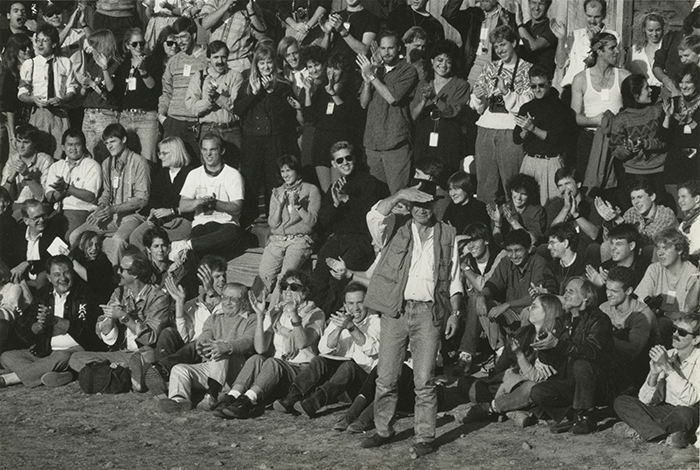
Adams at his workshop in 1988

=== Eddie Adams Workshop ===
In 1988, Adams and his wife, Alyssa Adams, founded the Eddie Adams Workshop, also known as Barnstorm, an annual tuition-free photojournalism workshop held each October at his farm in Jeffersonville, New York. Each year, 100 emerging photographers are selected on the strength of their portfolios to spend four days working with prominent photographers and picture editors. The workshop has continued annually since Adams's death in 2004; by its thirtieth year in 2017, close to 3,000 photographers had attended.

=== Awards ===
Along with the Pulitzer, Adams received more than 500 awards, including the George Polk Award for News Photography in 1968, 1977 and 1978, World Press Photo awards on 14 occasions, and numerous awards from the National Press Photographers Association, Sigma Delta Chi, Overseas Press Club, and many other organizations.

== Personal life ==
Adams was first married to Ann Fedorchak, with whom he had one son and two daughters. After the couple divorced, he married Alyssa Adkins in 1989; they had one son.

On September 19, 2004, Adams died in New York City at age 71 from complications of amyotrophic lateral sclerosis (ALS).

In 2009, his widow donated his photographic archive to the University of Texas at Austin.

== Publications ==
- Eddie Adams: Vietnam. New York City: Umbrage, 2008. Written and edited by Alyssa Adams. ISBN 978-1884167966.
- Eddie Adams: Bigger than the Frame. Austin, TX: University of Texas Press, 2017. By Eddie Adams. ISBN 978-1-4773-1185-1. With a foreword by Don Carleton, a preface by Alyssa Adams, and an essay by Anne Wilkes Tucker.

== Film about Adams ==
- An Unlikely Weapon (2009) – documentary feature directed by Susan Morgan Cooper and Tarik Burnett and narrated by Kiefer Sutherland.
