= James S. Robbins =

American journalist

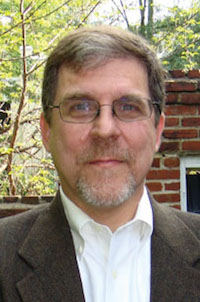
- Born: 1962 (age 63–64)
- Education: University of Cincinnati; Tufts University

James S. Robbins (born 1962) is an American commentary writer for USA Today and Senior Fellow for National Security Affairs on the American Foreign Policy Council. He is the former Senior Editorial Writer for Foreign Affairs at the Washington Times, an author, political commentator and professor, with a focus on national security and foreign and military affairs. He also served as special assistant in the Office of the Secretary of Defense.

His books include The Real Custer: from Boy General to Tragic Hero (2014), Native Americans: Patriotism, Exceptionalism and the New American Identity (2013), This Time We Win: Revisiting the Tet Offensive (2010) and Last in Their Class: Custer, Pickett and the Goats of West Point (2006). He is also a political commentator and contributing editor for National Review Online.

== Early life and education ==
Robbins was born in 1962. He earned bachelor's and master's degrees in political science from the University of Cincinnati. He received a Master of Arts in Law and Diplomacy (M.A.L.D.) and Ph.D. from The Fletcher School of Law and Diplomacy at Tufts University in Medford, Massachusetts.

== Career ==
Robbins taught at The Fletcher School, Boston University, Marine Corps University, National Defense University, and other schools. Robbins served in the federal government for ten years, including as special assistant to the Undersecretary of Defense for Policy in the Office of the Secretary of Defense in the George W. Bush administration.

In 2001, Robbins was a professor of International Relations at the National Defense University.

In 2007, Robbins was appointed Director of the Intelligence Community Center at Trinity Washington University. In 2008, he was selected as Program Chair of the Master of Arts in International Security Studies at Trinity Washington.

In 2009, Robbins was appointed Senior Editorial Writer for Foreign Affairs at the Washington Times, where he worked until November 2012.

From April to August 2013, Robbins served as Deputy Editor of Rare, a conservative web site that is part of the Cox Media Group.

In 2013 Robbins joined the USA Today board of contributors and is a US News contributor as well.

In addition to writing three books, he has written frequent articles for the National Review, the Washington Times, and a variety of other publications, including The Wall Street Journal, USA Today, The Baltimore Sun, and The Boston Herald. He is a frequent commentator on national and international television and radio.

Robbins is Senior Fellow in National Security Affairs at the American Foreign Policy Council. He serves on the Advisory Board of the National Civil War Museum.

== Books ==
- Erasing America: Losing our future by destroying our past. Regnery History. 2020. ISBN 9781684511679.
- The Real Custer: from Boy General to Tragic Hero. Regnery History. 2014. ISBN 9781621572367. OCLC 881162657.
- Native Americans: Patriotism, Exceptionalism and the New American Identity. Encounter Books. 2013. ISBN 9781594036101. OCLC 744288922.
- This Time We Win: Revisiting the Tet Offensive. Encounter Books. 2010. ISBN 9781594032295. OCLC 473655738.
- Last in Their Class: Custer, Pickett and the Goats of West Point. Encounter Books. 2006. ISBN 1594031428. OCLC 62895798.

== Articles ==
- “Afghanistan: Back To Basics,” in The Journal of International Security Affairs no. 15, Fall 2008, pp. 79–88.
- “Custer: The Goat at West Point and at War,” in Custer and His Times: Book Five, John P. Hart (ed), LaGrange Park, IL: Little Big Horn Associates (2008).
- “Dangerous Deterrence,” in Taking on Tehran: Strategies for Confronting the Islamic Republic, Ilan Berman (ed), Washington: Rowman & Littlefield (2007).
- “Insurgent Seizure of an Urban Area: Grozny, 1996,” in Countering Terrorism and Insurgency in the 21st Century: International Perspectives, Volume III, James J.F. Forest (ed), McGraw Hill (2006).
- “Battlefronts in the War of Ideas,” in Countering Terrorism and Insurgency in the 21st Century: International Perspectives, Volume I, James J.F. Forest (ed), McGraw Hill (2006).
- “Iraq,” in Flashpoints in the War on Terrorism, Derek Reveron (ed), New York: Routledge Publishers (2006).
- “Contemporary Operational-Level War Fighting” – a review of Nicholas E. Reynolds, Basrah, Baghdad, and Beyond: The U.S. Marine Corps in the Second Iraq War, Annapolis, Md.: Naval Institute Press, 2005, in the Naval War College Review, Spring 2006, Vol. 59, No. 2, pp. 157–161.
- “Soft Targets: Hard Choices,” in Homeland Security: Protecting America’s Targets, James J.F. Forest (ed), Westport, CT: Praeger Security International (2006).
- "Al-Qaeda Versus Democracy," Journal of International Security Affairs No. 9 (Fall 2005).
- “Terrorism, the Media, and Homeland Security,” in Homeland Security: Controlling the New Security Environment, Howard, Moore and Forest (eds), Guilford, CT: McGraw Hill Publishers (2005).
- “Defeating Networked Terrorism,” in Defeating Terrorism: Shaping the New Security Environment, Howard and Sawyer (eds.), Guilford, CT: McGraw Hill Publishers (2004).
- “Central Command: Tip of the Spear” in America’s Viceroys: The Military and U.S. Foreign Policy, Derek Reveron (ed.), New York: Palgrave Macmillan Publishers (2004).
- “Bin Laden’s War,” in Terrorism and Counterterrorism: Understanding the New Security Environment, Howard and Sawyer (eds.), Guilford, CT: McGraw Hill Publishers (2003).

== Legacy and honors ==
- Robbins is the recipient of the 2010 Maryland-Delaware-D.C. Press Association first place award for editorial writing.
- In 2011, he was awarded the Washington Times Excellence in Achievement award.
- In 2007, he was awarded the Chairman of the Joint Chiefs of Staff Joint Meritorious Civilian Service Award.
- In 2001, he was awarded the U.S. Department of State, Secretary’s Open Forum Distinguished Public Service Award.
