= A Man (Fallaci novel) =

1979 novel by Oriana Fallaci

- 1st edition front cover
- Author: Oriana Fallaci
- Original title: Un Uomo
- Language: Italian
- Genre: Biographical novel
- Published: 1979 (Italian); 1981 Pocket Books (English)
- Publication place: Italy
- Media type: Print (Hardback & Paperback)
- ISBN: 978-0-671-43487-8
- OCLC: 7919983

A Man (1979) (Italian: Un Uomo) (Greek: Ένας Άνδρας, transliteration: Enas Andras) is a biographical novel written by Oriana Fallaci chronicling her romantic relationship with the resistance fighter Alexandros Panagoulis, who attempted to assassinate the Greek dictator George Papadopoulos, leader of the Greek junta known as the Regime of the Colonels. Fallaci uses the novel to put forth her view that Panagoulis was assassinated by a conspiracy of junta sympathizers, a view shared by many Greeks.

== Plot summary ==
The story begins with the attempt by the young engineering student, Alekos Panagoulis, to kill the dictator of Greece, Geōrgios Papadopoulos. Despite numerous precautions, the assassination attempt fails and Alekos is captured, tortured and then sentenced to death. In the months to follow, the sentence is postponed several times and finally never carried out as the case had taken on media interest in Greece and abroad, and the killing of Alekos would result in serious damage to the regime's image.

Panagoulis secretly continued to be tortured by the junta's torturers but never bows to the will of his jailers or abets the dictatorship. He tries several times to escape from Boiati prison but all attempts fail. In his last two years of imprisonment, he is imprisoned in a specially-built cell called "The Tomb" precisely because of its shape and size. Exposed to the elements, forced into a limited space and periodically subjected to torture, after years of imprisonment and ill-treatment Panagoulis is set free. A few days later he meets Fallaci, who arrived to interview him. From that meeting, their love story would last until his death.

Released from prison, Panagoulis is disputed by both the right and left, but he realizes that the current democracy is fake and understands that the parliament is subjugated (albeit indirectly) by the power of the military dictatorship now represented by a new colonel. During this first period, he plans subversion against the new government, but he clashes with the silence and ignorance of the people and activists who slowly begin to forget him.

In the following months, the two, guarded by the secret services, manage to escape to Italy. There, they seek help from Italian and European politicians in a vain attempt to overthrow the Greek dictator. In Italy, the love between Panagoulis and Fallaci matures, snf she becomes pregnant but loses the child in a quarrel with him. The love story alternates between joy and estrangement between the two.

Some time later Panagoulis realizes that from abroad he has no power to change the situation in Greece and therefore decides to return to his homeland. Once back, Panagoulis tries to found his own political party but his initiative fails and joins an existing political party. Since he does not want to side with the right that is in government and directly controlled by the dictatorship nor with the left that wants to indoctrinate him to align his ideas with those of the party, he decides to join the weaker faction: the Centre Union – New Forces. With this party, he succeeds in being elected deputy. Here too, however, he cannot remain within the rigid logic of the structure and in practice becomes his own independent splinter faction. It is in this period that he is able to take possession of numerous documents of the Greek secret services and puts himself in open hostility with the present ruler of the new dictatorship: the defense minister Evangelos Averoff. Panagoulis releases secret documents but is subsequently killed in a traffic accident caused by two hitmen driving two different cars.

In the months immediately following Panagoulis' death, the Greek government does not support the evidence of the murder and declares the event only a tragic accident. In doing so, the Greek government ignores the Italian expert reports carried out on the Panagoulis car (which shows clear signs of ramming and rear-end collisions), ignores the accounts of the witnesses and archives all evidence. To discredit the publication of the secret documents, the government publishes its own revised version of the same, omitting the most compromising documents and publishing only the most harmless.

== Reviews ==
The work has had mixed reviews. Some readers find the harsh polemic repetitive and disturbing. Fallaci is said to have been angry at Ms. magazine for not reviewing the work and this enhanced her reputation as an anti-feminist.

== Adaptation ==
Between the 1980s and 1990s, several attempts to produce a film adaptation of the work fell through due to opposition from Fallaci. In 2021, the author's nephew, Edoardo Perazzi—heir to and holder of the copyrights to Fallaci's works—announced that a television series based on the novel was in development, to be produced by an American production company in the original English language.

== Quotes ==
"Don't help me then, hand me over to the police, what's the use anyway--"
"Of suffering, fighting? It allows us to live, my boy. A man who gives in doesn't live, he survives."
