= Alexandros Panagoulis =

Greek politician and poet (1939–1976)

- Αλέξανδρος Παναγούλης
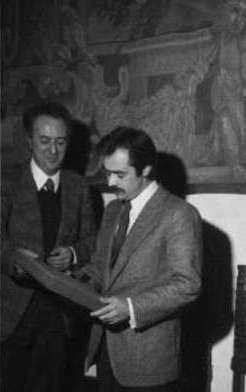
- Panagoulis in Florence (1973), with (to his right) Luigi Tassinari, president of the Province of Florence

Member of the Hellenic Parliament for Athens B
- In office 9 December 1974 – 1 May 1976

Personal details
- Born: 2 July 1939 Glyfada, South Athens, Greece
- Died: 1 May 1976 (aged 36) Athens, Greece
- Party: Centre Union
- Domestic partner: Oriana Fallaci (1973–1976)
- Profession: politician, poet

Alexandros Panagoulis (Greek: Αλέξανδρος Παναγούλης; 2 July 1939 – 1 May 1976) was a Greek politician and poet. He took an active role in the fight against the Regime of the Colonels (1967–1974) in Greece. He became famous for his attempt to assassinate dictator Georgios Papadopoulos on 13 August 1968, but also for the torture to which he was subjected during his detention. After the restoration of democracy, he was elected to the Greek parliament as a member of the Centre Union (E.K.).

== Biography ==
=== Family, childhood and education ===
Alexandros Panagoulis was born in the Glyfada neighbourhood of Athens. He was the second son of Vassilios Panagoulis, an officer in the Greek Army, and his wife Athena, and the brother of Georgios Panagoulis, also a Greek Army officer and victim of the Colonels' regime, and Efstathios, who became a politician. His father was from Divri (Lampeia) in Elis (Western Peloponnese) while his mother was from the Ionian island of Lefkada. Panagoulis spent part of his childhood during the Axis occupation of Greece in the Second World War on this island.

He studied at the National Technical University of Athens in the School of Electrical Engineering.

=== Politics ===
From his teenage years, Alexandros Panagoulis was inspired by democratic values. He joined the youth organisation of the Centre Union party (E.K.), known as O.N.E.K., under the leadership of Georgios Papandreou. The organisation later became known as Hellenic Democratic Youth (E.DI.N.). After the fall of the Colonels' regime and the restoration of parliamentary rule, Panagoulis became the Secretary-General of E.DI.N., on 3 September 1974.

=== Resistance to the dictatorship ===
Alexandros Panagoulis participated actively in the fight against the Regime of the Colonels. He deserted from the Greek military because of his democratic convictions and founded the organization National Resistance. He went into self-exile in Cyprus in order to develop a plan of action. He returned to Greece where, with the help of his collaborators, he organized the 13 August 1968 assassination attempt against Georgios Papadopoulos, close to Varkiza. The attempt failed and Panagoulis was arrested. In an interview held after his liberation, Italian journalist Oriana Fallaci quoted Panagoulis as saying: I didn’t want to kill a man. I’m not capable of killing a man. I wanted to kill a tyrant. He also stated that he had no regrets about his attempt to kill Papadopoulos as "he destroyed the legal government – he abolished the liberties of the people".

Panagoulis was put on trial by the Military Court on 3 November 1968, condemned to death with other members of National Resistance on 17 November 1968, and subsequently transported to the island of Aegina for the sentence to be carried out. As a result of political pressure from the international community, the junta refrained from executing him and instead incarcerated him at the Bogiati (Boyati) Military Prison near Athens on 25 November 1968.

Panagoulis refused to cooperate with the junta, and was subjected to physical and psychological torture. He escaped from prison on 5 June 1969. He was soon re-arrested and sent temporarily to the camp of Goudi. He was eventually placed in solitary confinement at Bogiati, from which he unsuccessfully attempted to escape on several occasions.

He reportedly refused amnesty offers from the junta. In August 1973, after four and a half years in jail, he benefited from a general amnesty that the military regime granted to all political prisoners during a failed attempt by Papadopoulos to liberalize his regime. Panagoulis went into self-exile in Florence, Italy, in order to continue the resistance. There he was hosted by Oriana Fallaci, his companion who was to become his biographer.

=== Restoration of democracy ===
After the restoration of democracy during the Metapolitefsi, Panagoulis was elected as Member of Parliament for the Center Union - New Forces party in the November 1974 elections. He made also a series of allegations against mainstream politicians who he said had openly or secretly collaborated with the junta. He eventually resigned from his party, after disputes with the leadership, but remained in the parliament as an independent deputy. He stood by his allegations, which he made openly against the then Minister of National Defence, Evangelos Averoff, and others. He reportedly received political pressure and threats against his life in order to persuade him to tone down his allegations.

=== Death ===
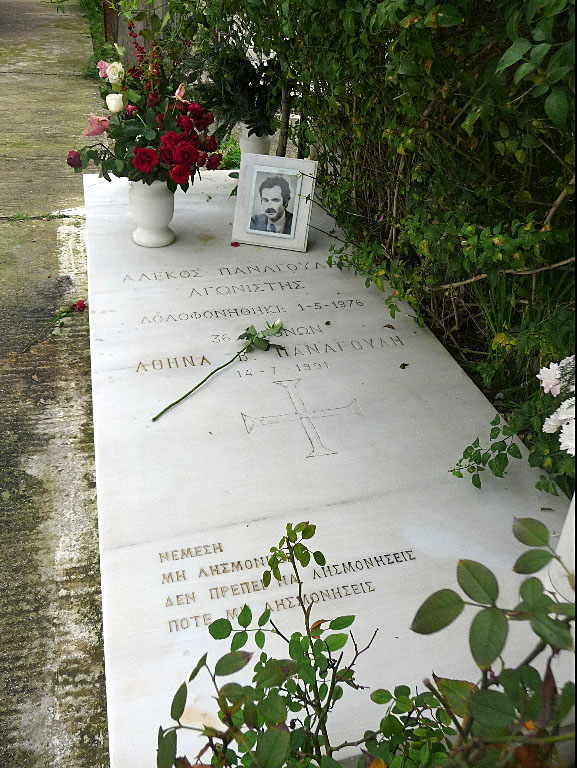
Grave of Alexandros (Alekos) Panagoulis; First Cemetery of Athens.

Panagoulis was killed on 1 May 1976 at the age of 36 under suspicious circumstances in a car accident on Vouliagmenis Avenue in Athens. A speeding car driven by a Corinthian named Stefas diverted Panagoulis' car and forced it to crash. The crash killed Panagoulis almost instantaneously. Albeit the judicial investigation prompted by the Panagoulis family ruled out an assassination attempt, witnesses at the scene declared that Panagoulis car swerved due to the car in front abruptly braking in a dangerous maneuver.

This event occurred two days before he was purportedly going to make public files of the junta's military police, allegedly revealing several ties within the junta and government officials. Files that, however, were never materialized.

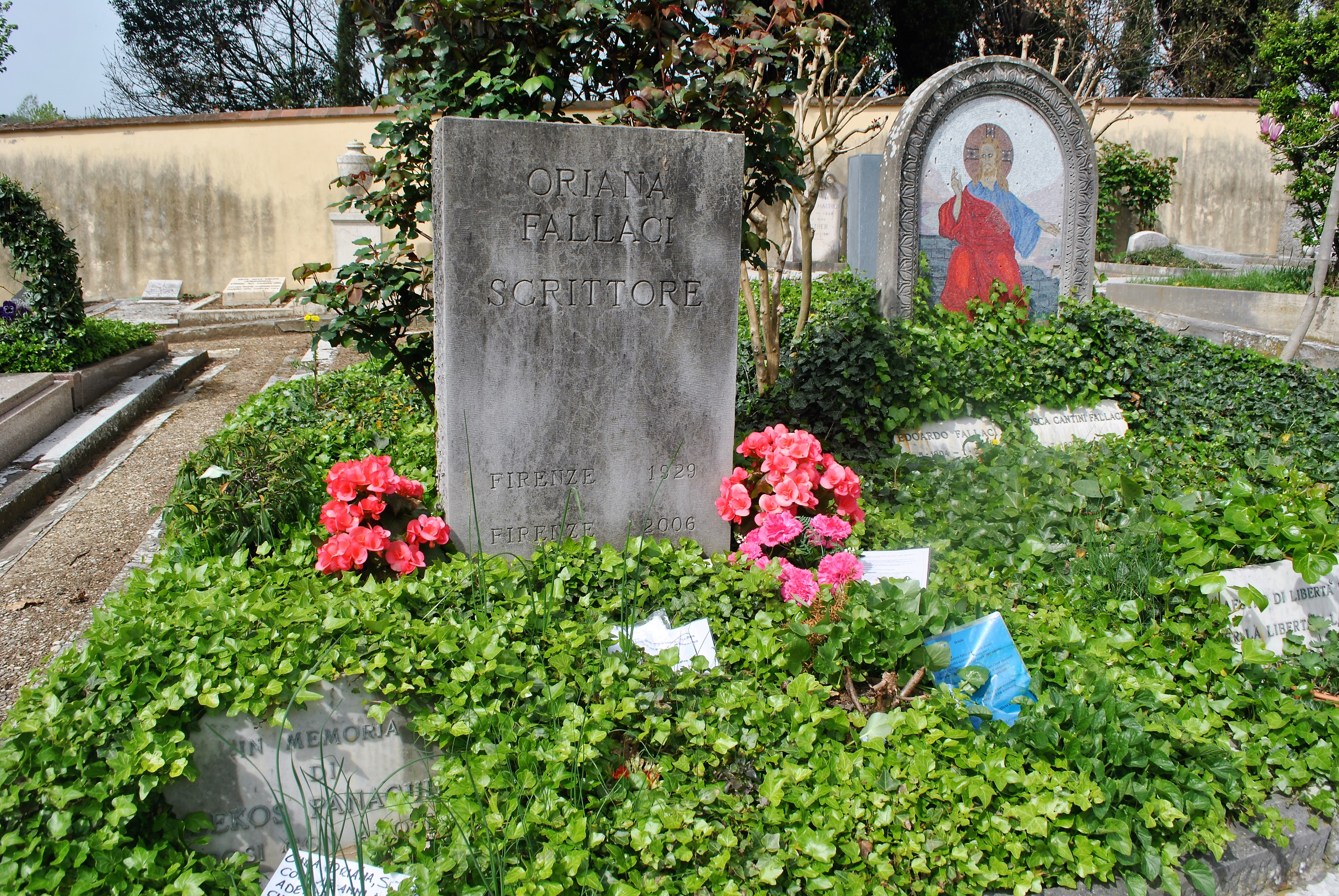
Cimitero degli Allori, Oriana Fallaci and memorial to Panagoulis

A memorial to Panagoulis is near Oriana Fallaci's tomb at Cimitero degli Allori, Florence.

== Poetic work ==
Alexandros Panagoulis was brutally tortured during his incarceration by the junta. Many believe that he maintained his faculties thanks to his will, determination to defend his beliefs, as well as his keen sense of humour. While imprisoned at Bogiati, Panagoulis is said to have written his poetry on the walls of his cell or on small papers, often using his own blood as ink (as told in the poem "The Paint"). Many of his poems have not survived. However, he managed to smuggle some to friends while in prison, or to recall and rewrite them later. While in prison his first collection in Italian titled Altri seguiranno: poesie e documenti dal carcere di Boyati (Others will Follow: Poetry and Documents of the Prison of Boyati) was published in Palermo in 1972 with an introduction of the Italian politician Ferruccio Parri and the Italian film director and intellectual Pier Paolo Pasolini. For this collection Panagoulis was awarded the Viareggio International Prize of Poetry (Premio Viareggio Internazionale) the following year. After his liberation he published his second collection in Milan under the title Vi scrivo da un carcere in Grecia (I write you from a prison in Greece) with an introduction by Pasolini. He had previously published several collections in Greek, including The Paint (I Bogia).

=== Poems ===
Promise
The teardrops which you will see
flowing from our eyes
you should never believe
signs of despair.
They are only promise
promise for Fight.

(Military Prisons of Bogiati, February 1972)

Vi scrivo da un carcere in Grecia, 1974

My Address
A match as a pen
Blood on the floor as ink
The forgotten gauze cover as paper
But what should I write?
I might just manage my address
This ink is strange; it clots
I write you from a prison
in Greece

(Military Prisons of Bogiati, 5 June 1971 – After beating)

Vi scrivo da un carcere in Grecia, 1974.

The Paint

I gave life to the walls
a voice I gave them
more friendly so that would become my company
and the guards asked
to know where they could find the paint

The walls of the cell
kept the secret
and the mercenaries searched everywhere
but paint they could not find

Because they did not think for one moment
that they should search into my veins

Vi scrivo da un carcere in Grecia, 1974

== Legacy ==
Alexandros Panagoulis on trial by the junta.

To most Greeks, Alexandros Panagoulis's attempted "tyrannicide" rendered him a symbol of freedom, democracy, human rights, and civil and political freedoms. He constitutes a rare instance of an attempted assassin being elevated to the status of hero of democracy due to his political ethos.

Greece issued a postage stamp in his honour (1996) and a prepaid telephone card (1996). However, the Greek state after the fall of the Colonels did not honor him for a long time. For instance, his actions are not mentioned in school textbooks, with very few exceptions. There is still growing suspicion regarding this, given that a minority of active current politicians in Greece are allegedly linked to the Colonels' regime and do not wish to promote Panagoulis' deeds. The Greek Ministry of Culture (under the minister Evangelos Venizelos) refused to contribute €1,500 in order to facilitate the translated publication of Panagoulis' poems. This has changed during the last years: by 2008, 22 streets in Athens and its suburbs are named after him and a metro station in Athens (Agios Dimitrios, which is close to the place of his death) was renamed to carry his name (Metro Station in Greek).

=== Film, music, and literature ===
The life and work of Alexandros Panagoulis attracted the interest of a number of artists.

Renowned composer Mikis Theodorakis, also persecuted by the junta, set some of his poems to music. Panagoulis collaborated with composer Ennio Morricone on the 1974 album Non Devi Dimenticare, which featured Panagoulis' poetry and was partly narrated by him (LP RCA PL31238, 1979).

Panagoulis was the subject of Panagulis Vive (Panagoulis Lives), a 1980 220-minute, four-part Italian RAI mini-series directed and co-written by Giuseppe Ferrara (IMDB entry). He also participated in a 45-minute 1973 documentary Altri Seguiranno (Others will follow), with photography-montage by Silvano Agosti. The German filmmaker Ebbo Demant broadcast a 1976 documentary "Eine Rose ist eine Rose ist eine Rose. Ein Mord ist ein Mord ist ein Mord." There is also Der Fall Panagoulis, a film by German Public TV channel ARD.

Panagoulis became the object of study of several researchers. One of the results was Un Uomo (A Man), by Oriana Fallaci. In 2024, The biographical novel ORIANA: A Novel of Oriana Fallaci was published by author Anastasia Rubis and is based on the true story of Fallaci and Panagoulis' relationship.

== Bibliography ==
- Langlois, Denis, Panagoulis, le sang de la Grèce (= The blood of the Greeks), Paris: François Maspero, 1969 ("Cahiers libres" series, no 161); new supplmentary edition, Caudebec-en-Caux: SCUP, 2018 (in French)
- Panagoulis, Alexandros, Poiemata, Athens: Ekdoseis 8 1/2 and Paris (63, Avenue Parmentier: M. Vassilikos, 1971 (in Greek)
- Panagoulis, Alexandros, Altri seguiranno: poesie e documenti dal carcere di Boyati (= And others will follow: poetry and documents from the prison of Boyati), Palermo: Flaccovio, 1972 (in Italian)
- Panagoulis, Alexandros, Mes' apo phylakē sas graphō stēn Ellada, Athens: Ekdoseis Papazēsē, ca. 1975 (in Greek)
- Fallaci, Oriana, Intervista con la storia, Milan: Rizzoli, 1973; English translation (John Shepley, tr.): Interview with History, New York: Liveright Publishing Corporation, 1976; London: Michael Joseph, 1976; Boston: Houghton Mifflin Company, 1977.
- Panagoulis, Alexandros, et al. (Collectif Change), Police Fiction: gouverner, étant une fiction, Paris: Seghers/Laffont, 1973 (Change series, No 15)
- Panagoulis, Alexandros, Vi scrivo da un carcere in Grecia (= I write to you from a prison in Greece), Milan, Rizzoli, 1974; reprinted as: Alexandros Panagulis, Vi scrivo da un carcere in Grecia : memorie di un partigiano contro la dittatura dei Colonnelli (I write to you from a prison in Greece: memoirs of a partisan against the dictorship of the Colonels), Milano: Pgreco, 2017 (in Italian)
- Fallaci, Oriana, Un Uomo: Romanzo (A Man), Milan: Rizzoli, 1979 (in Italian); English translation (William Weaver, tr.): A Man, New York: Simon & Schuster, 1980.
- Giovanni Pattavina, Alekos Panagulis: il rivoluzionario don Chisciotte di Oriana Fallaci : saggio politico-letterario, Edizioni Italiani di Letteratura e Scienze, 1984 (in Italian)
- Giannēs Bultepsēs, Hē agnōstē tragōdia tu Aleku Panagulē, Athens: Isokratēs, 1984 (in Greek)
- Mardas, Constantinos, Αλέξανδρος Παναγούλης – Πρόβες Θανάτου (= Alexandros Panagoulis – Rehearsal of Death), Athens, 1997. (in Greek)
- Panagoulis, Alexandros, Τα ποιήματα (= The Poems), Athens, Παπαζήση (= Papazisi), no date but c. 2000 (in Greek)
- Panagoulis, Alexandros, 'Collected Poems', Athens, Papazissis Publishers, 2002 (in English)
- Alexandros Panagoulēs and Gian Paolo Serino, USA & Getta: Fallaci e Panagulis, storia di un amore al tritolo, Reggio Emilia: Aliberti, 2006 (in Italian)
- Alexandros Panagoulēs: prōtagōnistēs kai vardos tēs antistasēs, Athens: Ekdotikos Organismos Livanē, 2008 (in Greek)
- Langlois, Denis (2017), Alekos Panagoulis / Αλέκος Παναγούλης, Athens, Papazissis Publishers, preface by Stathis Panagoulis. (in Greek)
- Denis Langlois, Nektaria Thomadakē and Stella Charitopoulou, Alekos Panagoulēs, to haima tēs Helladas (= The blood of the Greeks), Athens: Ekdoseis Papazēsē, 2017 (in Greek)

== See also ==
- Amalia Fleming
