= Oriana Fallaci =

Italian journalist and author (1929–2006)

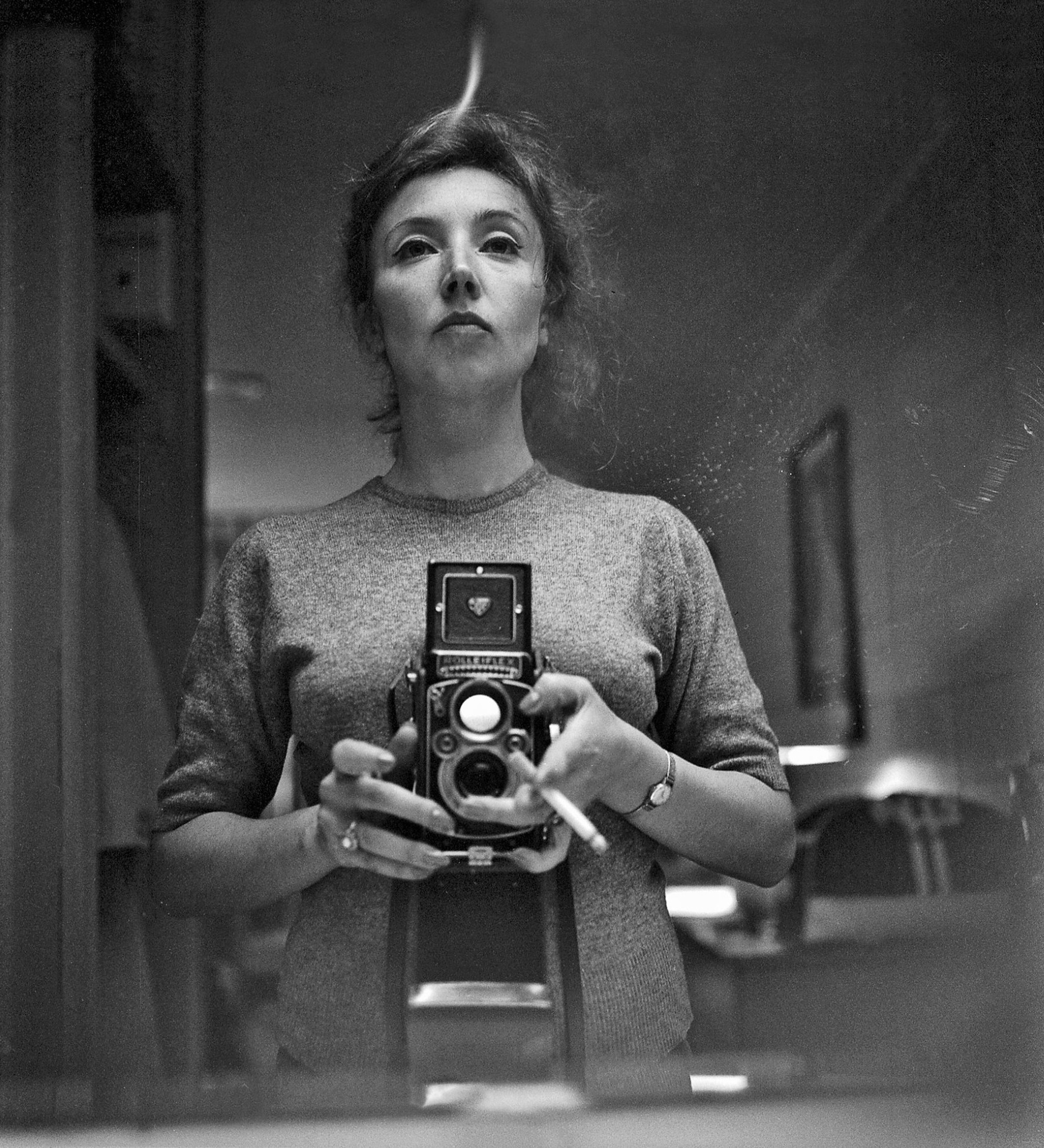
- Fallaci in 1960
- Born: 29 June 1929; Florence, Italy
- Died: 15 September 2006 (aged 77); Florence, Italy
- Resting place: Cimitero degli Allori, Florence
- Occupations: Journalist; author; interviewer

Oriana Fallaci (Italian: [oˈrjaːna falˈlaːtʃi]; 29 June 1929 – 15 September 2006) was an Italian journalist and author. As a teenager she joined the Italian resistance movement during World War II, and later had a long and successful journalistic career. Fallaci became famous worldwide for her coverage of war and revolution, and her "long, aggressive and revealing interviews" with many world leaders during the 1960s, 1970s, and 1980s. She received various prizes for her work as a journalist and later wrote a number of best selling books.

Fallaci's book Interview with History contains interviews with Indira Gandhi, Golda Meir, Yasser Arafat, Zulfikar Ali Bhutto, Willy Brandt, Shah of Iran Mohammad Reza Pahlavi, Ruhollah Khomeini, Henry Kissinger, South Vietnamese president Nguyễn Văn Thiệu, and North Vietnamese general Võ Nguyên Giáp during the Vietnam War. The interview with Kissinger was published in The New Republic. Kissinger later wrote that it was "the single most disastrous conversation I have ever had with any member of the press".

She grew up during WWII in Italy and much of her career was focused on reporting from war zones, with the associated dangers. In 1968 Mexican soldiers shot her three times, and left her for dead. But she continued to go and report from zones of conflict. After retirement in New York, following the September 11th terrorist attacks in 2001, she wrote some articles and books critical of Islam that gained popular support but also led to accusations of Islamophobia.

== Early life ==
Fallaci was born in Florence, Italy, on 29 June 1929. Her father Edoardo Fallaci, a cabinet maker in Florence, was a political activist struggling to put an end to the dictatorship of Italian fascist leader Benito Mussolini. In 1944 he was arrested and tortured at the so called Villa Triste (the sad villa) in Florence.

During World War II she joined the Italian anti-fascist resistance movement Giustizia e Libertà. At age 12 she became a clandestine carrier of both messages and munitions across the river Arno in Florence, given that all bridges (except Ponte vecchio) on the river had been destroyed by the Germans and a teenager was not seen as a suspect. She also assisted her father in helping people escape from the Nazis. She later received a certificate for valour from the Italian army.

Her views on power were formed during those early years, and in a 1976 retrospective collection of her works, she remarked:

Whether it comes from a despotic sovereign or an elected president, from a murderous general or a beloved leader, I see power as an inhuman and hateful phenomenon ... I have always looked on disobedience toward the oppressive as the only way to use the miracle of having been born.

And she felt that speaking against oppression and injustice was not a choice, but an obligation:

There are moments in life when keeping silent becomes a fault, and speaking an obligation. A civic duty, a moral challenge, a categorical imperative from which we cannot escape.

== Career ==
=== Beginning as a journalist ===
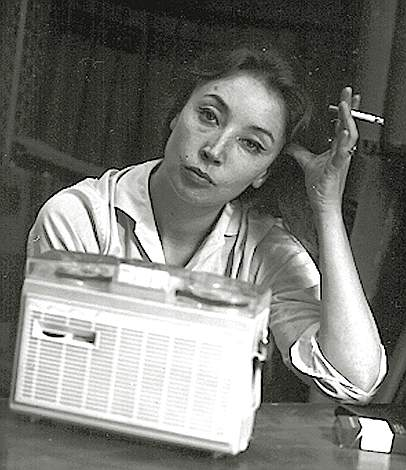
A young Oriana with her tape recorder

After attaining her secondary school diploma, Fallaci briefly attended the University of Florence where she studied medicine and chemistry. She later transferred to literature but did not finish her studies. She began writing as a means of supporting herself during her studies, not expecting that it would become her lifelong endeavor. But her uncle Bruno Fallaci, himself a journalist, suggested that she should pursue a career in journalism.

She later became a special correspondent for the Italian paper Il mattino dell'Italia centrale in 1946. Beginning in 1967, she worked as a war correspondent covering the Vietnam War, the Indo-Pakistani War, the Middle East, and in South America.

=== 1960s ===
For many years, Fallaci was a special correspondent for the political magazine L'Europeo, and wrote for a number of leading newspapers and the magazine Epoca.

In Mexico City, during the 1968 Tlatelolco massacre following student demonstrations, Fallaci was shot three times by Mexican soldiers, twice in the back, dragged downstairs by her hair, and left for dead. She was driven to the morgue but unexpectedly regained consciousness. Her eyewitness account became important evidence disproving the Mexican government's denials that a massacre had taken place.

In the 1960s she began conducting interviews, first with people in the world of literature and cinema (published in book form in 1963 as Gli antipatici) and later with world leaders (published in the 1973 book Intervista con la storia), which have led some to describe her as "during the 1970s and 80s the most famous – and feared – interviewer in the world".

=== 1970s ===
In the early 1970s, Fallaci had a relationship with the subject of one of her interviews, Alexandros Panagoulis, who had been a solitary figure in the Greek resistance against the military dictatorship known as the Regime of the Colonels. Panagoulis had been captured, heavily tortured and imprisoned for his unsuccessful assassination attempt on dictator and former Hellenic Army colonel Georgios Papadopoulos. Panagoulis died in 1976, under controversial circumstances, in a road accident. Fallaci maintained that Panagoulis' "accident" had been arranged by remnants of the Greek military junta despite the transition to a democracy, and her novel A Man was inspired by his life.

During her 1972 interview with Henry Kissinger, she made him admit that the Vietnam War was a "useless war". He then compared himself to "the cowboy who leads the wagon train by riding ahead alone on his horse". Kissinger later claimed that it was "the single most disastrous conversation I have ever had with any member of the press". In 1973, she interviewed Mohammad Reza Pahlavi, the Shah of Iran. She later stated, "He considers women simply as graceful ornaments, incapable of thinking like a man, and then strives to give them complete equality of rights and duties". After interviewing the Bangladeshi statesman Sheikh Mujibur Rahman, she described him as "One of the most stupid men I've ever met in my life, maybe the most stupid".

During her 1979 interview with Ayatollah Khomeini, she addressed him as a "tyrant", and managed to unveil herself from the chador:

OF: I still have to ask you a lot of things. About the "chador", for example, which I was obliged to wear to come and interview you, and which you impose on Iranian women.... I am not only referring to the dress, but to what it represents, I mean the apartheid Iranian women have been forced into after the revolution. They cannot study at the university with men, they cannot work with men, they cannot swim in the sea or in a swimming-pool with men. They have to do everything separately, wearing their "chador". By the way, how can you swim wearing a "chador"?

AK: None of this concerns you, our customs do not concern you. If you don't like the Islamic dress, you are not obliged to wear it, since it is for young women and respectable ladies.

OF: Very kind (of you). Since you tell me that, I'm going to immediately rid myself of this stupid medieval rag. There!

=== 1980s ===
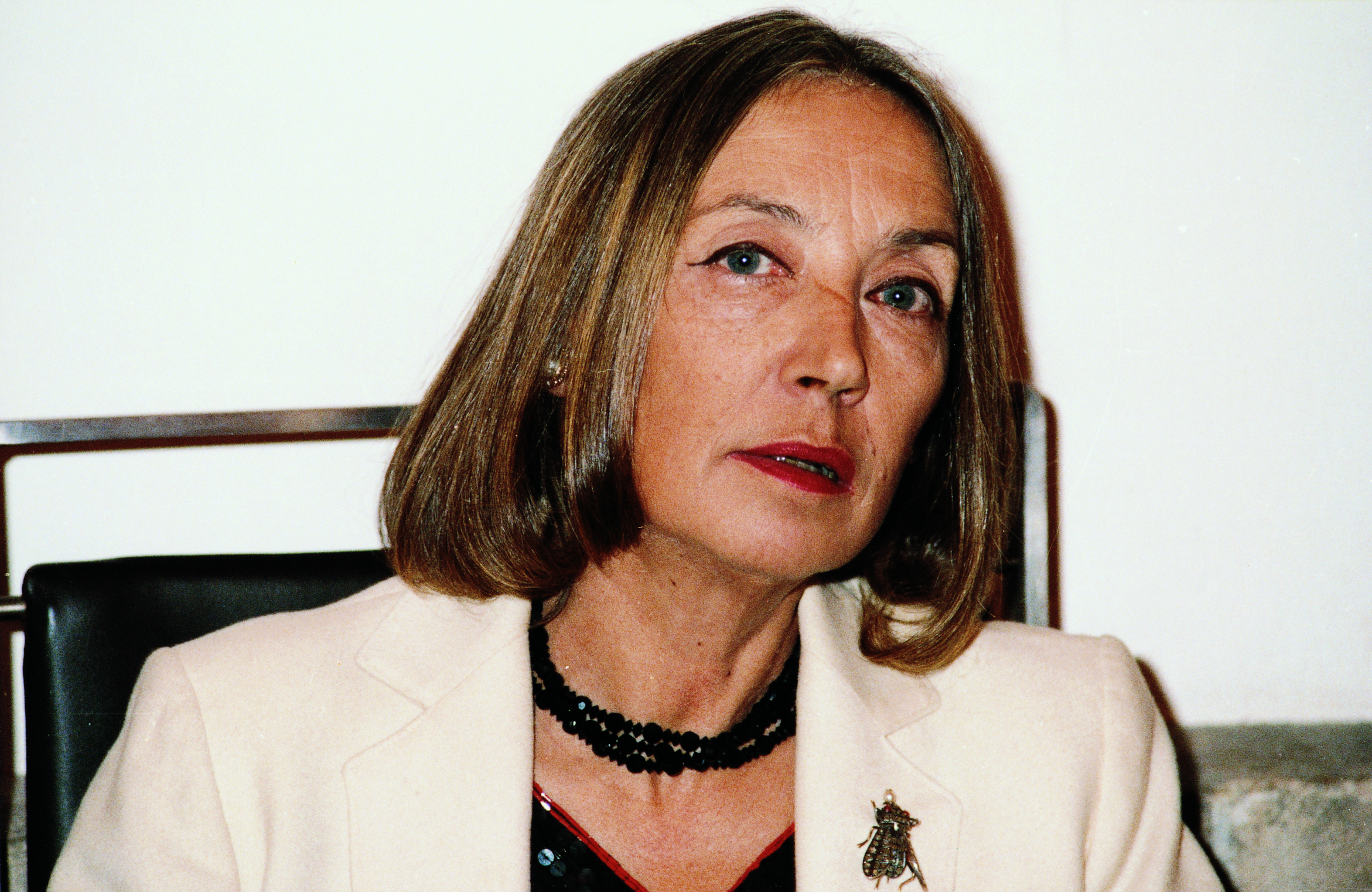
Oriana Fallaci in 1987

In 1980 Fallaci interviewed Deng Xiaoping. Michael Rank described this interview as the "most revealing ever of any Chinese leader by any western journalist", during which Deng spoke about Mao "extraordinarily frankly by Chinese standards" whereas most Western interviews with Chinese leaders have been "bland and dull".

=== Retirement ===
Living in New York City and in a house she owned in Tuscany, Fallaci lectured at the University of Chicago, Yale University, Harvard University and Columbia University.

=== After 9/11 ===
After the terrorist attacks of 11 September 2001, Fallaci wrote three books critical of Islamic extremists and Islam in general, and in both writing and interviews warned that Europe was "too tolerant of Muslims". The first book was The Rage and the Pride (initially a four-page article in Corriere della Sera, the major national newspaper in Italy). In this book, she calls for the destruction of what is now called Islam.

She wrote that the "sons of Allah breed like rats", and in a Wall Street Journal interview in 2005, she said that Europe was no longer Europe but "Eurabia". The Rage and the Pride and The Force of Reason both became bestsellers, the former selling over one million copies in Italy and 500,000 in the rest of Europe, and are considered part of the "Eurabia genre". Her third book in the same vein, Oriana Fallaci intervista sé stessa – L'Apocalisse ("The Apocalypse"), sold some two million copies globally, the three books together selling four million copies in Italy.

== Personal views, relationships and death ==
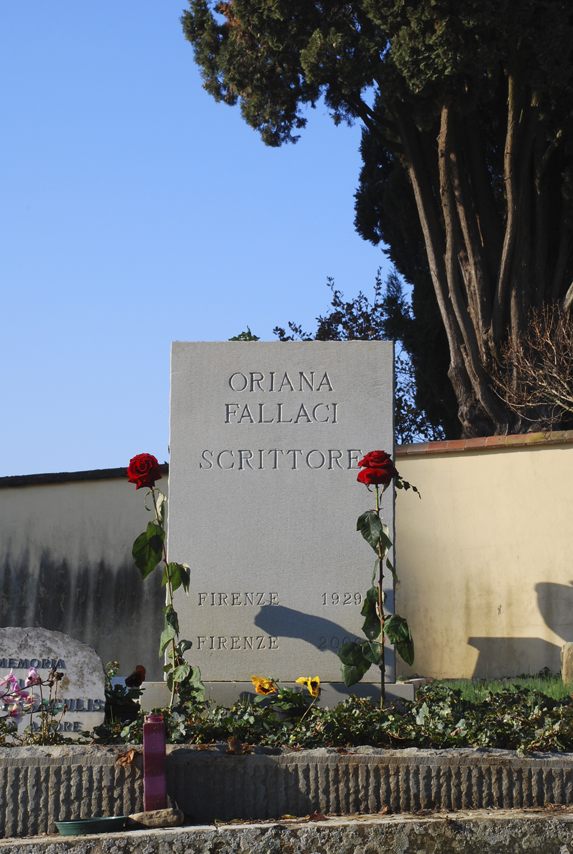
Cimitero degli Allori, Oriana Fallaci's grave with a stone memorial to Alexandros Panagoulis on the left.

As a teenager during WWII Fallaci supported the Italian resistance, and took pride in her physical courage despite her small stature. Cristina De Stefano wrote that, in Bangladesh, Fallaci separated from the other journalists and took a small boat to Dhaka and arrived alone to witness the dictator's troops killing prisoners and burying them in common graves.

Fallaci lived with Alexandros Panagoulis in Florence from 1973 until his death in 1976. Fallaci wrote A Man, a book inspired by his life and claimed that his death was not an accident but had been arranged.

Fallaci had stated that during her life she had only three friends who were women: Ingrid Bergman, Anna Magnani and Maria Callas, all of whom had initially sought her friendship. Fallaci had strong views about the mistreatment of women, and spoke out against the Taliban and the status of women in Afghanistan.

In The Force of Reason, she described herself as a "Christian atheist". Fallaci was a vocal critic of Islam, especially after the Iranian Revolution and the September 11 attacks in 2001. When rumours of the construction of an Islamic centre in the city of Siena intensified, Fallaci told The New Yorker she would "blow it up with the help of her friends".

In 2005, she read an interview with Rino Fisichella in Corriere della Sera and contacted him. Over time they grew close and he introduced her to Pope Benedict XVI. He said that she had grown to doubt her atheism, but her strong character continued to question the authority of the Church. He was with her during her last days and arranged her funeral.

Fallaci died on 15 September 2006, in her native Florence, from cancer. She was buried in the Cimitero Evangelico degli Allori in the southern suburb of Florence, Galluzzo, alongside her family members and a stone memorial dedicated to Panagoulis.

== Legacy ==
Fallaci interviewed prominent figures such as Deng Xiaoping, Andreas Papandreou, Haile Selassie, Lech Wałęsa and Muammar Gaddafi.

As of 2018, streets and squares have been renamed after her in Pisa, Arezzo, and Genoa. A public garden is dedicated to her in Sesto San Giovanni, an industrial town close to Milan.

In July 2019, the lower chamber of the Italian Parliament approved the creation of low-denomination treasury bills that could also be used as a de facto parallel currency to the euro. According to the plan's main proponent, the League's MP Claudio Borghi, the 20-euro bill should bear a picture of Fallaci.

An Italian television series was created about her life, titled Miss Fallaci (2024).

In 2024, a biographical novel, Oriana: A Novel of Oriana Fallaci, was published by author Anastasia Rubis based on the true story of Fallaci's career and personal life.

Fallaci is referenced as an inspiration for the journalist in the film Close-Up directed by Abbas Kiarostami.

== Support and awards ==
=== Support ===
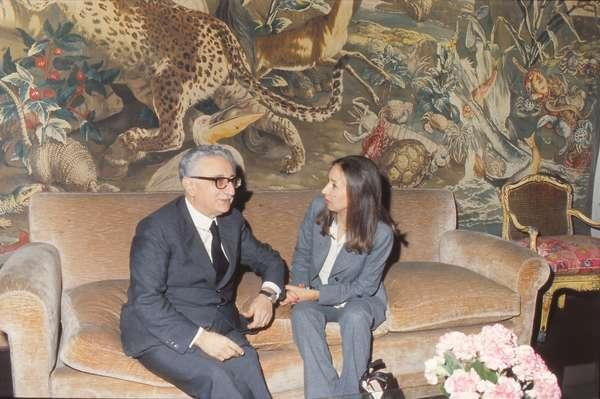
Fallaci with Giovanni Leone, the president of Italy in 1973

Antonio Socci, a Catholic journalist, admired Fallaci, and wrote "Oriana Fallaci is not only a great journalist: for me she is 'the' journalism." He stated that Fallaci's work would remain the best school of journalism for long and a "vaccine against all idiots, variously placed in the hierarchies of power".

Although Fallaci was an atheist, she respected and was received by Pope Benedict XVI. Along with Msgr Fisichella, who was close to her, she went to Castel Gandolfo to visit the pope. She respected the pope for his advice that Europe should go back to its roots and resist change. She met the pope alone. She gave him a copy of one of her books and he gave her some of his writings.

Sylvia Poggioli, a reporter for National Public Radio stated that she had followed Fallaci's writings for long, and considered Fallaci a pioneer for a later generation of women journalists. Poggioli asked Fallaci why all those world leaders had agreed to talk to her, and Fallaci giggled and said: "They all looked at this small little woman and thought they could manipulate me at will."

Australian journalist David Leser wrote that Fallaci was internationally known and admired for her impassioned approach and her fearless style of dealing with subjects. He said that she had been a personal hero to him for much of his career, and that she often inspired other journalists to follow her style or actions. As an example he mentioned that upon entering Vietnam Fallaci was given a standard form to fill, and in response to the question "where should your body be sent if you are killed in action?" she wrote: The White House. Many other journalists then started using the same response. As for another Australian journalist, Jonathan Swan, told the same about her, that she was his hero for her fearlessness.

In 2011 the "Oriana Fallaci Award" for young journalists was established in Tuscani, in her memory.

=== Awards ===
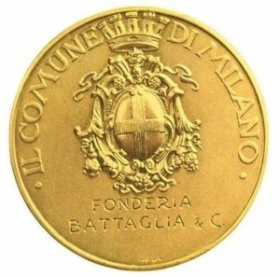
The Ambrogino d'oro medal

Fallaci twice received the St. Vincent Prize for journalism (1967, 1971). She also received the Bancarella Prize (1970) for Nothing, and So Be It and the Viareggio Prize (1979), for A Man. Later, she received the Prix Antibes, 1993, for Inshallah. She received a D.Litt. from Columbia College (Chicago).

On 30 November 2005, in New York City, Fallaci received the Annie Taylor Award for courage from the Center for the Study of Popular Culture. She was honoured for the "heroism and the values" that rendered her "a symbol of the fight against Islamic fascism and a knight of the freedom of humankind". The Annie Taylor Award is annually awarded to people who have demonstrated unusual courage in adverse conditions and great danger. David Horowitz, founder of the center, described Fallaci as "a General in the fight for freedom". On 8 December 2005, Fallaci was awarded the Ambrogino d'oro (Golden Ambrogino), the highest recognition of the city of Milan. She also received the Jan Karski Eagle Award.

Acting on a proposal by the Minister of Education Letizia Moratti, on 14 December 2005, the president of the Italian Republic, Carlo Azeglio Ciampi, awarded Fallaci a gold medal for her cultural contributions (Benemerita della Cultura). The state of her health prevented her from attending the ceremony. She wrote in a speech: "This gold medal moves me because it gratifies my efforts as writer and journalist, my front line engagement to defend our culture, love for my country and for freedom. My current well-known health situation prevents me from travelling and receiving in person this gift that for me, a woman not used to medals and not too keen on trophies, has an intense ethical and moral significance."

On 12 February 2006, the president of Tuscany, Riccardo Nencini, who for long had been a friend of Fallaci, awarded her a gold medal from the Council of Tuscany. Nencini reported that the prize was awarded as Fallaci was a beacon of Tuscan culture in the world. During the award ceremony, held in New York City on 21 February 2006, the writer talked about her attempt to create a caricature of Mohammed, following the polemic relating to similar caricatures that had appeared in French and Dutch newspapers. She declared: "I will draw Mohammed with his 9 wives, including the little baby he married when 70 years old, the 16 concubines, and a female camel wearing a Burqa. So far my pencil stopped at the image of the camel, but my next attempt will surely be better."

She received the America Award of the Italy–USA Foundation in 2010 (in memoriam).

== Controversies ==
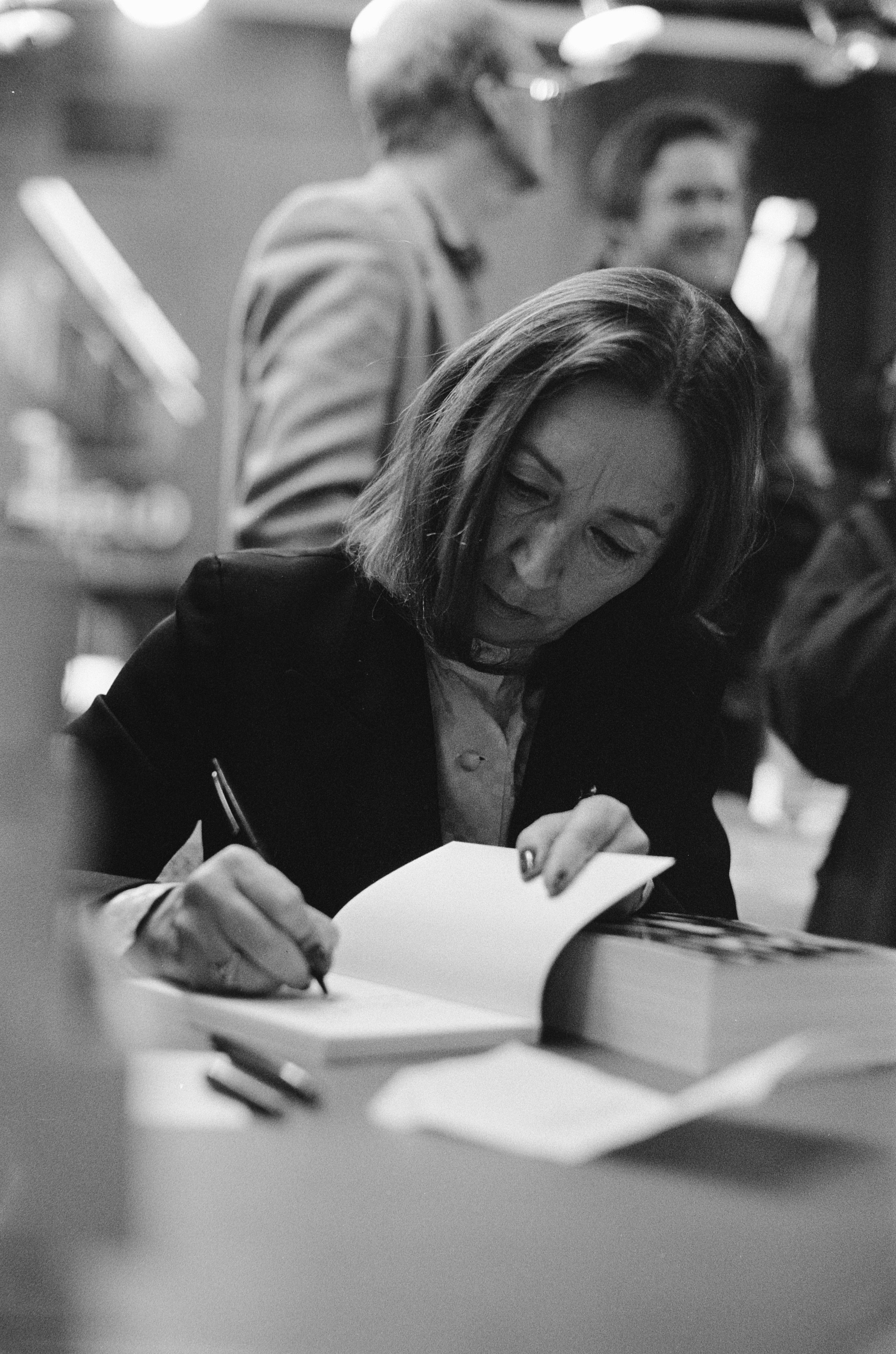
Fallaci signing her book in Amsterdam, 1980

Fallaci received much public attention for her controversial writings and statements on Islam and European Muslims. She claimed that Muslims were colonizing Europe through immigration and high fertility rates, in line with the Eurabia concept. Fallaci received criticism as well as support in Italy, where her books have sold millions of copies. During the first year of its release her Inshallah book had 45 printings and sold 700,000 copies in Italy. The Force of Reason sold 800,000 copies in Italy.

At the first European Social Forum, which was held in Florence in November 2002, Fallaci invited the people of Florence to cease commercial operations and stay home. Furthermore, she compared the ESF to the Nazi occupation of Florence. Protest organizers declared, "We have done it for Oriana, because she hasn't spoken in public for the last 12 years and hasn't been laughing in the last 50".

In 2002, in Switzerland, the Islamic Center and the Somal Association of Geneva, SOS Racisme of Lausanne, along with a private citizen, sued Fallaci for the allegedly racist content of The Rage and the Pride. In November 2002, a Swiss judge issued an arrest warrant for violations of articles 261 and 261 bis of the Swiss criminal code and requested that the Italian government either prosecute or extradite her. Italian Minister of Justice Roberto Castelli rejected the request on the grounds that the Constitution of Italy protects freedom of speech.

In May 2005, Adel Smith, president of the Union of Italian Muslims, launched a lawsuit against Fallaci charging that "some of the things she said in her book The Force of Reason are offensive to Islam". Smith's attorney cited 18 phrases, most notably a reference to Islam as "a pool that never purifies". Consequently, an Italian judge ordered Fallaci to stand trial in Bergamo on charges of "defaming Islam". The preliminary trial began on 12 June, and on 25 June, Judge Beatrice Siccardi decided that Fallaci should indeed stand trial beginning on 18 December. Fallaci accused the judge of having disregarded the fact that Smith had called for her murder and defamed Christianity.

In France, some Arab-Muslim and anti-defamation organisations such as MRAP and Ligue des Droits de l'Homme launched lawsuits against Oriana Fallaci, charging that The Rage and the Pride and The Force of Reason were "offensive to Islam" and "racist". Her lawyer, Gilles William Goldnadel, president of the France-Israel Organization, was also Alexandre del Valle's lawyer during similar lawsuits against del Valle.

On 3 June 2005, Fallaci published on the front page of the Corriere della Sera a highly controversial article titled "Noi Cannibali e i figli di Medea" ("We cannibals and Medea's offspring"), urging women not to vote for a public referendum about artificial insemination that was held on 12 and 13 June 2006.

In her 2004 book Oriana Fallaci intervista sé stessa – L'Apocalisse, Fallaci expressed her opposition to same-sex marriage, arguing that it "subvert[s] the biological concept of family" and calling it "a fashionable whim, a form of exhibitionism", and also against parenting by same-sex couples, declaring it a "distorted view of life". She also asserted the existence of a "gay lobby", through which "the homosexuals themselves are discriminating against others".

In the June 2006 issue of Reason, American libertarian writer Cathy Young wrote: "Oriana Fallaci's 2002 book The Rage and the Pride makes hardly any distinction between radical Islamic terrorists and Somali street vendors who supposedly urinate on the corners of Italy's great cities." Christopher Hitchens, writing in The Atlantic, called the book "a sort of primer in how not to write about Islam", describing it as "replete with an obsessive interest in excrement, disease, sexual mania, and insect-like reproduction, insofar as these apply to Muslims in general and to Muslim immigrants in Europe in particular".

== Bibliography ==
- I sette peccati di Hollywood, (The Seven Sins of Hollywood), preface by Orson Welles), Milan: Longanesi, 1958; Best BUR, 2014 (digital edition).
- Il sesso inutile, viaggio intorno alla donna, Rizzoli, Milan, 1961; Best BUR, 2014 (digital edition); English translation (Pamela Swinglehurst, tr.): The Useless Sex: Voyage around the Woman, New York: Horizon Press, 1964.
- Penelope alla guerra, Milan: Rizzoli, 1962; Best BUR, 2014 (digital edition); English translation, Penelope at War, London: Michael Joseph, 1966, Pamela Swinglehurst, tr.
- Gli antipatici, Milan: Rizzoli, 1963; Best BUR, 2014 (digital edition); English translation (Pamela Swinglehurst, tr.): Limelighters, London: Michael Joseph, 1967, and The Egotists: Sixteen Surprising Interviews, Chicago: Regnery, 1968. Interviews with Norman Mailer, Sean Connery, Ingrid Bergman, Nguyễn Cao Kỳ, H. Rap Brown, Geraldine Chaplin, Hugh Hefner, Federico Fellini, Sammy Davis Jr., Anna Magnani, Jeanne Moreau, Dean Martin, Duchess of Alba, Alfred Hitchcock, Mary Hemingway, and El Cordobés.
- Se il Sole muore, Milan: Rizzoli, 1965; Best BUR, 2010 (digital edition); English translation (Pamela Swinglehurst, tr.): If the Sun Dies: New York, Atheneum Books, 1966, and London: Collins, 1967. About the US space program.
- Niente, e cosí sia, Milan: Rizzoli, 1969; Best BUR, 2010 (digital edition); English translation (Isabel Quigly, tr.): Nothing, And So Be It: A Personal Search for Meaning in War, New York: Doubleday, 1972, and Nothing and Amen, London: Michael Joseph, 1972. A report on the Vietnam War based on personal experiences.
- Quel giorno sulla Luna, Milan: Rizzoli, 1972; Best BUR, 2010 (digital edition).
- Intervista con la storia, Milan: Rizzoli, 1974; Best BR, 2008 (digital edition); English translation (John Shepley, tr.): Interview with History, New York: Liveright Publishing Corporation, 1976; London: Michael Joseph, 1976; Boston: Houghton Mifflin Company, 1977. A collection of interviews with sixteen political figures.
- Lettera a un bambino mai nato, Milan: Rizzoli, 1975; Best BUR, 2014 (digital edition); English translation (John Shepley, tr.): Letter to a Child Never Born, New York: Simon & Schuster, 1976, and London: Arlington Books, 1976. A dialogue between a mother and her eventually miscarried child.
- Un uomo: Romanzo, Milan: Rizzoli, 1979; Best BUR, 2010 (digital edition); English translation (William Weaver, tr.): A Man, New York: Simon & Schuster, 1980. A novel about Alexandros Panagoulis, a Greek revolutionary hero who fights alone and to the death for freedom and truth.
- Insciallah, Milan: Rizzoli, 1990; Best BUR, 2014 (digital edition); English translation (by Oriana Fallaci, working from a translation by James Marcus): Inshallah, New York: Doubleday, 1992, and London: Chatto & Windus, 1992. A fictional account of Italian troops stationed in Lebanon in 1983.
- La Rabbia e l'orgoglio Milan: Rizzoli, 2001; English translation: The Rage and the Pride, New York: Rizzoli, 2002. ISBN 0-8478-2504-3. A post-11 September manifesto.
- La Forza della ragione, Milan: Rizzoli, 2004; Best BUR, 2014 (digital edition); English translation: The Force of Reason, New York: Rizzoli International, 2004. ISBN 0-8478-2753-4. A sequel to La Rabbia e l'orgoglio (The Rage and the Pride).
- Oriana Fallaci intervista Oriana Fallaci, Milan: Corriere della Sera, August 2004; not translated into English. Fallaci interviews herself on the subject of "Eurabia" and "Islamofascism".
- Oriana Fallaci intervista sé stessa – L'Apocalisse, Milan: Rizzoli, 2004. An update (in Italian) of the interview with herself. A new, long epilogue is added.
- Un cappello pieno di ciliegie, Milan: Rizzoli, 2008; BURbig, 2010 (digital edition); not translated into English. A novel about her ancestors, published two years after her death. Fallaci worked on it for ten years, until the 11 September attacks and her books inspired by them.
- Intervista con il mito, Milan: Rizzoli, 2010; Best BUR, 2010 (digital edition).
- Le radici dell'odio: La mia verità sull'Islam, Milan: Rizzoli Vintage, 2015; BUR Rizzoli, 2016 (digital edition).

== See also ==
- Robert Spencer
- Steven Emerson
- Daniel Pipes
- Bat Ye'or
- Alexandre del Valle
- Tiziano Terzani
