= Mary Gillies =

English children's author

- Born: 16 June 1800; City of London, England
- Died: 20 July 1870 (aged 70); Hampstead, England
- Occupation: Author

Mary Gillies (16 June 1800 – 20 July 1870) was a British children's author, and sister of the artist Margaret Gillies.

== Early life ==
Mary Gillies was born in London on 16 June 1800, the eldest daughter of William Gillies, a Scottish merchant in Throgmorton Street, London, and his wife Charlotte Hester Bonnor, daughter of Thomas Bonnor. William's business ran into difficulties and after Charlotte's death in 1811, Mary and her younger sister Margaret (1803–1887), were placed under the care of their uncle and aunt, the prominent Unitarians Lord and Lady Gillies, who educated them and introduced them into Edinburgh society. During their time in Edinburgh, the two girls were introduced to Thomas Southwood Smith, the new preacher to the Unitarian congregation at Skinners' Hall, Canongate, who was to play a large part in their later lives.

== Career ==
In the early 1820s, Mary and her sister returned to London to live with their father. Margaret pursued a successful career as a portraitist, exhibiting regularly at the Royal Academy, and whose subjects included the writers Charles Dickens and Richard Hengist Horne, as well as feminist figures Mary Leman Grimstone and Mary Howitt. Mary turned to literature and lived with Richard Hengist Horne for several years, sharing houses in Upper Montagu Street, 5 Fortess Terrace, Kentish Town (later renamed 40 Fortess Road) and Hillside, Fitzroy Park Highgate, with her sister and Thomas Southwood Smith. This cohabitation of two unmarried women with their partners, one of whom was himself married, was calmly accepted by some but shocked many who ostracised them. In Highgate, amongst their friends and neighbours were the Quaker writers William Howitt and his wife Mary. It was the latter who arranged the visit to Hillside of the children's writer Hans Christian Andersen during his trip to England in 1847.

Mary Gillies's first book for children, The voyage of the Constance: A tale of the Polar Seas, was published in 1860. Four books followed over the next three years, with illustrations by Myles Birket Foster and Edward Henry Wehnert. Her final book, More Fun for our little Friends was published under the pseudonym 'Harriet Myrtle', so it is possible that her, and her sister's, reputation may have been thought by her publisher to have affected sales of her earlier books adversely.

== Later life ==
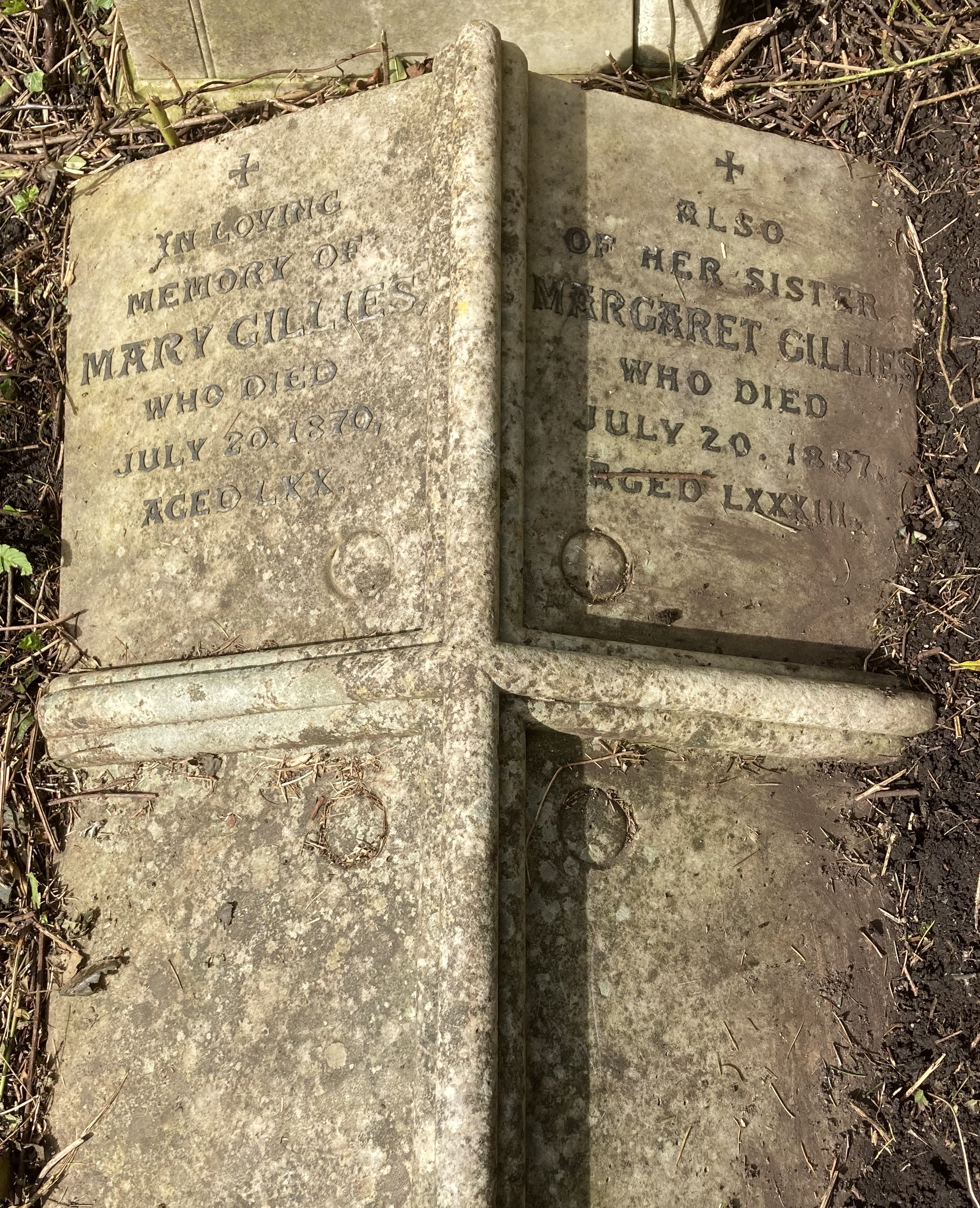
Grave of Mary Gillies in Highgate Cemetery

Mary's final move, in the early 1860s, was to 25 Church Row, Hampstead, where she lived with Margaret, and for some years, Charles Lewes, the son of George Lewes, and his wife Gertrude, Southwood Smith's granddaughter. Mary and Margaret worshipped at the Rosslyn Hill Unitarian Chapel.

Mary died on 20 July 1870 and is buried in the dissenters' section of the western side of Highgate Cemetery. In the grave she is interred with an 1866 stillborn baby of Charles & Gertrude Lewes and also with Catherine, the widow of Richard Hengist Horne, who died in 1893. In the adjoining grave rests Caroline Southwood Hill (buried on 3 January 1903), Southwood Smith's daughter and mother of the social reformers Miranda Hill and Octavia Hill, the latter of whom jointly founded the National Trust. Margaret died in Crockham Hill, Kent, in 1887 and, although not buried with Mary in Highgate, is memorialised on Mary's grave.

== Works ==
- The voyage of the Constance: A tale of the Polar Seas (1860)
- My little Lizzie (1861)
- The Carewes: A Tale of the Civil Wars (W. Kent & Co, 1861), illustrated by Myles Birket Foster
- Great Fun for our little friends (1862), illustrated by Edward Henry Wehnert
- More Fun for our little Friends (1863), under the pseudonym Harriet Myrtle, illustrated by Edward Henry Wehnert
