= Margaret Gillies =

Scottish painter

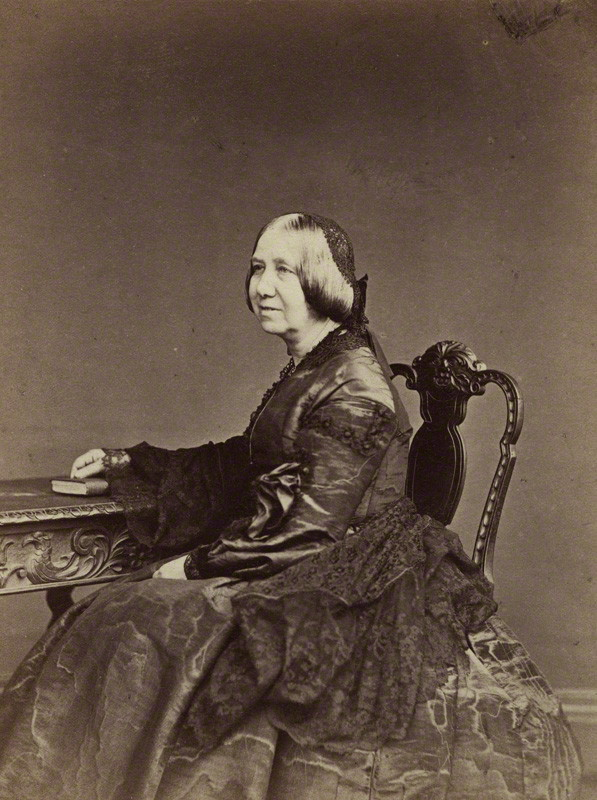
- Margaret Gillies, 1864 photograph
- Born: 7 August 1803; London, England
- Died: 20 July 1887 (aged 83); Crockham Hill, Kent
- Known for: Painting
- Partner: Thomas Southwood Smith

Margaret Gillies (7 August 1803 – 20 July 1887) was a London-born Scottish miniaturist and watercolourist.

== Biography ==
Gillies was the second daughter of William Gillies, a Scottish merchant in Throgmorton Street, London, and his wife Charlotte Hester Bonnor (died 1811), daughter of Thomas Bonnor. Having lost their mother when Margaret was eight years old, and their father having met with business reverses, she and her older sister, Mary (1800–1870), were placed under the care of their uncle, Adam Gillies, Lord Gillies. They were educated by him, and then introduced to Edinburgh society.

Before she was twenty, Gillies decided to earn her own living, and returned with her sister to her father's home in London. Mary Gillies became an author, while Margaret took the direction of a professional artist. She received lessons in miniature-painting from Frederick Cruikshank, and gained a reputation for it. Cruikshank's style was based on that of Andrew Robertson.

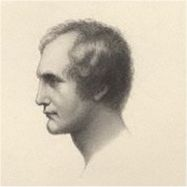
Southwood Smith, 1844 engraving by James Charles Armytage after a drawing by Margaret Gillies

In the early 1830s Thomas Southwood Smith, a physician, Unitarian and a pioneer in the improvement of the health of the poor, particularly in London, separated from his second wife, Mary, and went to live with Gillies and her sister Mary.

The 1841 census records Margarett Gillies as aged 35 living at Hortet's Terrace, St.Pancras with Thomas Smith aged 50, Gertrude Hill aged 3, Harriet Lebe 21 and Sarah Hargrove 15. Smith and Gillies lived together at Hillside, Fitzroy Park, Highgate from 1844. Smith, an ordained Unitarian minister, and Gillies associated with the group around the Monthly Repository, a Unitarian periodical; Mary Gillies was involved in editing it from 1836. Margaret Gillies illustrated in 1842 Smith's first report as a mines inspector, on a tour in Leicestershire and West Yorkshire.

Around 1850 Gillies' studio was at 36 Percy Street, where she briefly gave a home to the "auto-icon" of Jeremy Bentham, on whose cadaver Southwood Smith had conducted a highly controversial public dissection in 1832. She went in 1851 to Paris for a year, where she worked in the studios of Hendrik and Ary Scheffer, and on her return to England she exhibited some portraits in oils. She then concentrated on watercolour painting, typically choosing domestic, romantic, or sentimental subjects, for which she was best known. She joined the Society of Female Artists in 1856. In 1854, short of money, they had moved to The Pines, near Weybridge, but Gillies kept a studio in 6 Southampton Street, off Fitzroy Square, later renumbered 27 Conway Street. The 1861 census records Mary Gillies 60, authoress and Margaret Gillies 56, Artist in Water Colours, living at Heath House, Weybridge with Thomas S Smith, 72, physician and widower, his son Herman Smith 40, Wine merchant, his granddaughter Gertrude Hill 23, lady, and also a cook and servant. Thomas Southwood Smith died in Florence, Italy in 1861.

After Smith's death, Margaret and Mary Gillies lived for many years at 25 Church Row, Hampstead, and worshipped at the Unitarian Chapel, Rosslyn Hill. Living with her was Charles Lewes, son of George Lewes the lover of George Eliot, and his wife Gertrude, Southwood Smith's granddaughter. Mary died in 1870 and early in 1887 Margaret moved to Kent, to a house rented by Gertrude, The Warren, Crockham Hill, where she died later that year, on 20 July, of pleurisy, after a few days' illness. Among her pupils was Marian Emma Chase, and she gave early encouragement to Anna Mary Howitt and the portraitist Mary Field, wife of the architect Horace Field.

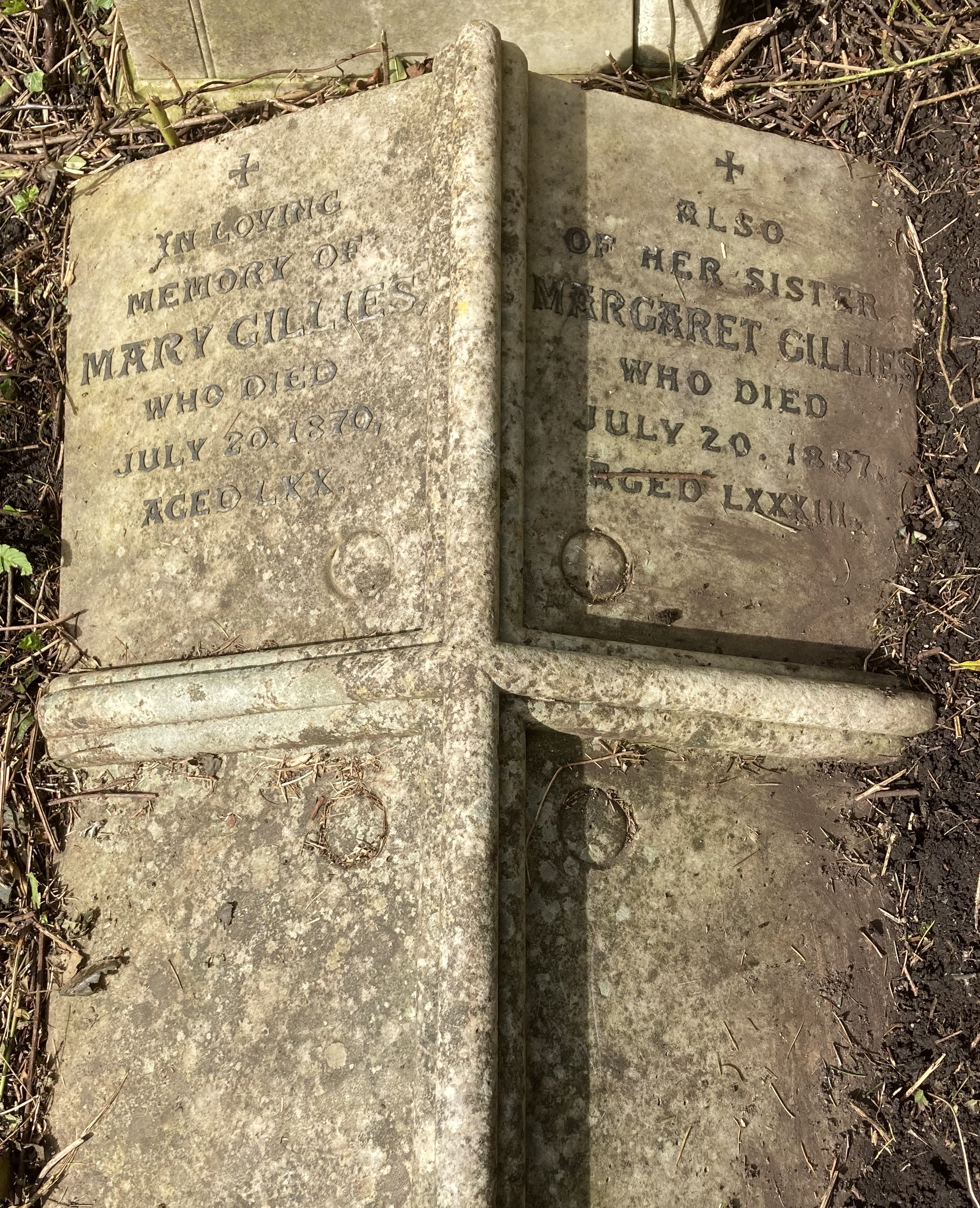
Grave of Mary Gillies in Highgate Cemetery

In 1866 Margaret bought a grave plot in the dissenters' section of the western side of Highgate Cemetery for a stillborn baby of Charles and Gertrude Lewes. Mary was later interred in this grave on 23 July 1870, as was Catherine, the widow of the poet and critic Richard Hengist Horne, on 6 September 1893. In the adjoining grave rests Caroline Southwood Hill (buried on 3 January 1903), Southwood Smith's daughter and mother of the social reformers Miranda Hill and Octavia Hill, the latter of whom jointly founded the National Trust. The ashes of Caroline's youngest daughter Florence was the last interment in December 1935. Although Margaret Gillies is memorialised on this grave she is buried elsewhere, presumably in Crockham Hill.

== Works ==
Before she was 24, Gillies was commissioned to paint a miniature of William Wordsworth, and stayed at Rydal Mount for several weeks. She has three oil paintings in British national collections—in Aberystwyth, Nottingham and the National Portrait Gallery. Pamela Gerrish Nunn wrote that she "combined an early-Victorian aesthetic with a mid-Victorian independence of mind".

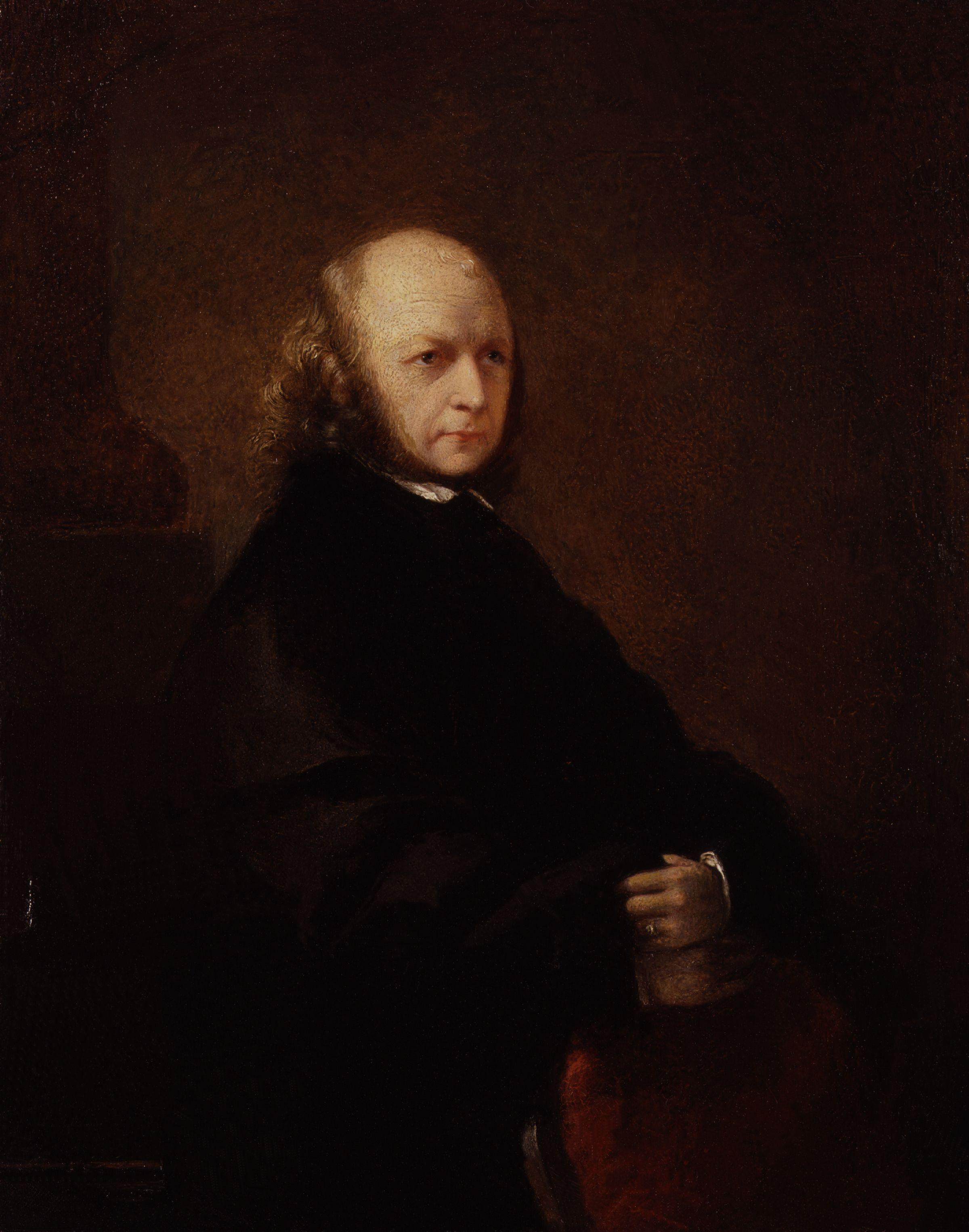
Richard Henry (or Hengist) Horne by Margaret Gillies, c. 1840

=== Portrait artist ===
During the 1830s and 1840s Gillies was a career portrait artist, and for many successive years contributed portraits to the exhibitions of the Royal Academy. Her subjects included feminist figures: Mary Leman Grimstone, Mary Howitt and her daughter Anna Mary Howitt, Harriet Martineau of the Monthly Repository group. She also painted the poet and critic Richard Hengist Horne and the novelist Anne Marsh-Caldwell.

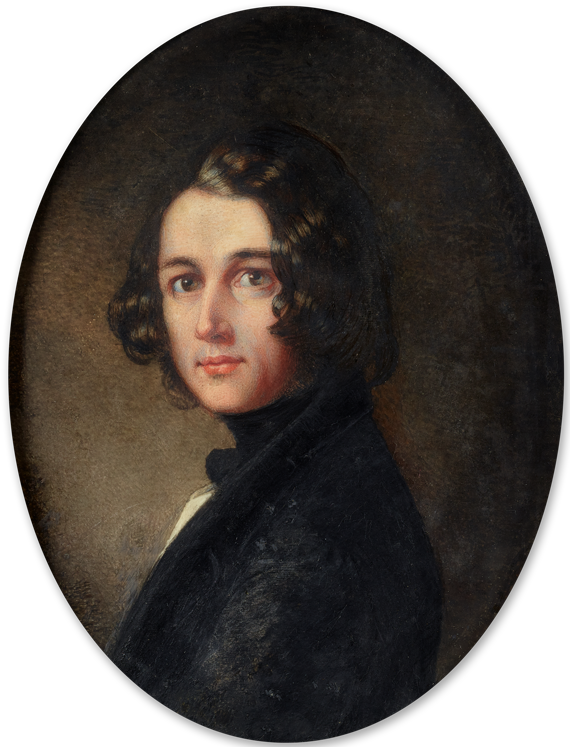
Charles Dickens, portrait by Margaret Gillies, 1843

Her portrait of Charles Dickens, painted during the period when he was writing A Christmas Carol, was in the Royal Academy of Arts' 1844 summer exhibition. After viewing it there, Elizabeth Barrett Browning said that it showed Dickens with "the dust and mud of humanity about him, notwithstanding those eagle eyes". A simplified form was used as the frontispiece of a book, A New Spirit of the Age, in the same year. The painting's location was unknown (from later in Gillies' lifetime, when she was unable to trace it) until it was rediscovered in Pietermaritzburg, South Africa, and acquired and restored by the art dealer Philip Mould in 2018.

=== Watercolourist ===
In 1852 Gillies was elected an associate of the Old Society of Painters in Water Colours, and was a contributor to its exhibitions for the rest of her life. Her exhibited works included:

- Past and Future, 1855, and The Heavens are telling, 1856, both of which were engraved
- Rosalind and Celia, 1857
- Una and the Red Cross Knight in the Cavern of Despair, An Eastern Mother, and Vivia Perpetua in Prison, 1858
- A Father and Daughter, 1859
- Imogen after the Departure of Posthumus, 1860
- Beyond, 1861
- The Wanderer, 1868
- Prospero and Miranda, 1874
- Cercando Pace, a drawing in three compartments, 1875
- The Pilgrimage, exhibited at the Royal Jubilee Exhibition at Manchester in 1887

Her last work was Christiana by the River of Life, exhibited in 1887.

== Notes ==
Attribution

This article incorporates text from a publication now in the public domain: Stephen, Leslie, ed. (1890). "Gillies, Margaret". Dictionary of National Biography. Vol. 21. London: Smith, Elder & Co.
