= How Six Made Their Way in the World =

German fairy tale

Folk tale
- Name: How Six Made Their Way in the World
- Also known as: How Six Men got on in the World; How Six Travelled through the World
- Aarne–Thompson grouping: ATU 513A
- Country: Germany
- Published in: Grimms' Fairy Tales

"How Six Made Their Way in the World" (German: Sechse kommen durch die ganze Welt, KHM 71) is a Grimms' fairy tale about an ex-soldier and his five companions with special abilities who through their feats obtain all of the king's wealth. It is classed as ATU type 513 A, or the "Six Go through the Whole World" type.

The Grimms' main version is the one of many collected from storyteller Dorothea Viehmann, localized in Zwehren; a version close to it known in Paderborn is also discussed in their notes.

"How Six Men got on in the World" (Hunt, 1884), "How Six Travelled through the World" (Wehnert, 1853) are among other English-translated title given for this tale. A lesser known translation was given as Fritz and his Friends.

== Plot ==
A soldier discharged from military duty receives only three coins for his service. (Note: "Heller" in the original text, Hunt (tr.) (1884) gives "three farthings", Zipes (2014), p. 136 "three pennies". A "few Hellers" would mean a small amount of money rather than any specifically denominated amount.) He vows that the king will one day hand over all his treasures. While traveling, the soldier meets five others with extraordinary abilities, and recruits them to become his servants. They are: a strong man who pulled six trees from the ground with his bare hands, a keen-eyed hunter who was taking aim at a fly on a twig two miles away, (Note: Original text:"zwei Meilen".) a man whose breath could turn seven windmills, a fast runner who had to remove one leg to slow himself down, (Note: Hunt indicates that the one leg that is "taken off" is "buckled.. on" when time to run. The original text uses the word abgeschnallt "unstrapped" in both instances, which Zipes's full translation gives as "unbuckled". Zipes in his commentary explains it in the opposite, saying that when the runner "unbuckles one leg" it makes him fly faster than a bird. The Paderborn variant belongs to the case where removal would make him faster (he has a cannon tied to one leg).) and a man who causes a terrible frost in the air unless he wears his hat crooked over one ear.

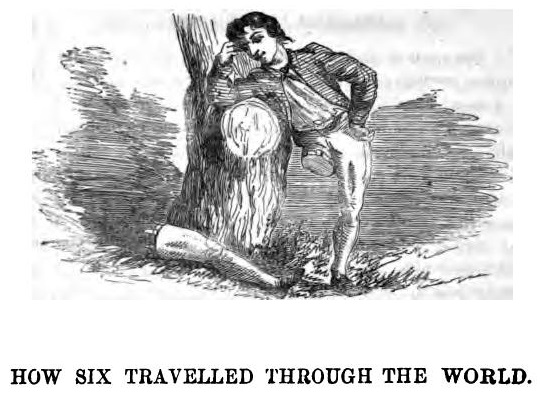
The Runner with his leg off. —E. H. Wehnert (1853)

The soldier and his servants go to town where the king has organized a footrace with his daughter: the reward for victory was her hand in marriage, and punishment for defeat was death. The contestant and the princess must carry a pitcher (de: Krug) of the same kind, draw water from a certain well and return. The soldier is granted permission to have his servant substitute for him in the race, and the fast runner completely outdistances the daughter immediately. But after he fills his pitcher, he feels weary halfway on his return, and takes a nap using a horse's skull as pillow (Note: The original reads Pferdeschädel and given as "horse's skull" by Zipes in the full translation, Zipes says it is a "rock" under his head in commentary.) This does not prevent him from oversleeping, and the daughter catches up with him and upsets his pitcher. The keen-eyed hunter witnesses this, and shoots the skull from under his head. The runner wakes, refills his pitcher and finishes the race well ahead of the princess.

The princess does not wish to marry a common ex-soldier, and the king decides not to honor the promise by plotting murder. He invites the six companions into an iron-floored room for a banquet, and orders a fire be stoked from underneath to roast them to death. But death is averted thanks to the ability of the frost-bringer, who straightens his hat.

The king, baffled that the men survived, bribes the soldier into renouncing marriage to his daughter. The soldier asks for as much gold as his servant can carry, and the strong man carries all the king's wealth in a huge bag, and they leave. The king angrily sends soldiers on horseback after them, but the man with the powerful breath power blows all the soldiers away. One sergeant is spared alive and sent back to tell the king what happened. Upon hearing the events the monarch decides to leave the soldier and his servants alone to live rich and happy for the rest of their lives.

== Parallels ==
The tale is classed as folktale type 513 A "Six Go through the Whole World" under the Aarne–Thompson classification system. To this type also belongs "The Six Servants" (KHM 134).

The story is very similar to other European folk tales and fairy tales about a man with very talented servants, such as "The Six Servants", "Long, Broad and Sharpsight", "The Fool of the World and the Flying Ship", "How the Hermit Helped to Win the King's Daughter", "The Clever Little Tailor". Rudolf Erich Raspe and Gottfried August Bürger interpolated an adaptation of the tale into his version of the Baron Munchausen stories.
