= Langnek =

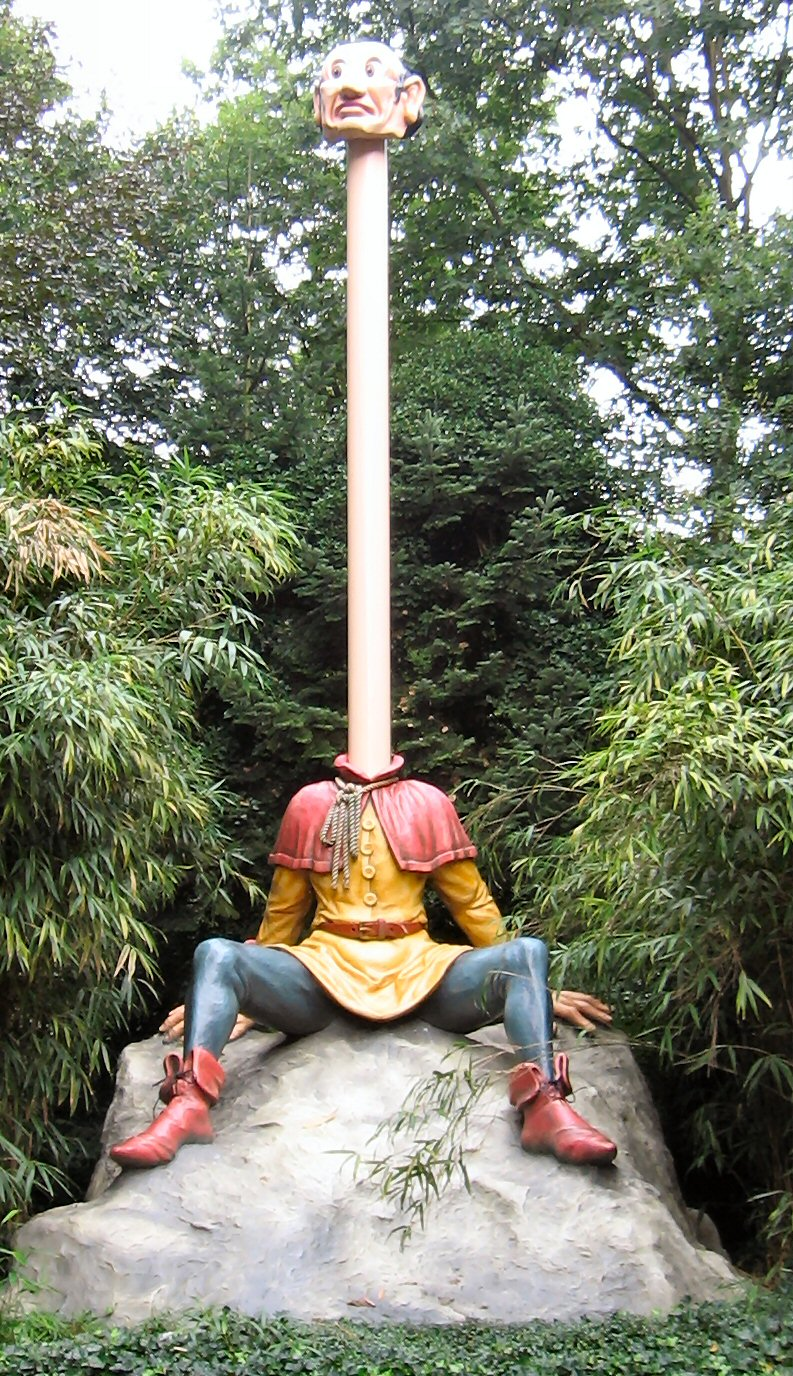
- Langnek in 2006

Efteling

Ride statistics
- Attraction type: Walkthrough
- Designer: Anton Pieck
- Theme: Fantasy

Langnek (Long Neck) is a depiction of the fairy tale The Six Servants in the Fairytale Forest at the Dutch amusement park Efteling. Langnek opened on 31 May 1952, along with the rest of the park. It is the third fairy tale along the route through the Fairy Tale Forest, located between The Gnome Village and Little Red Riding Hood.

Langnek has grown into the main iconic figure of the Efteling.

== Components ==
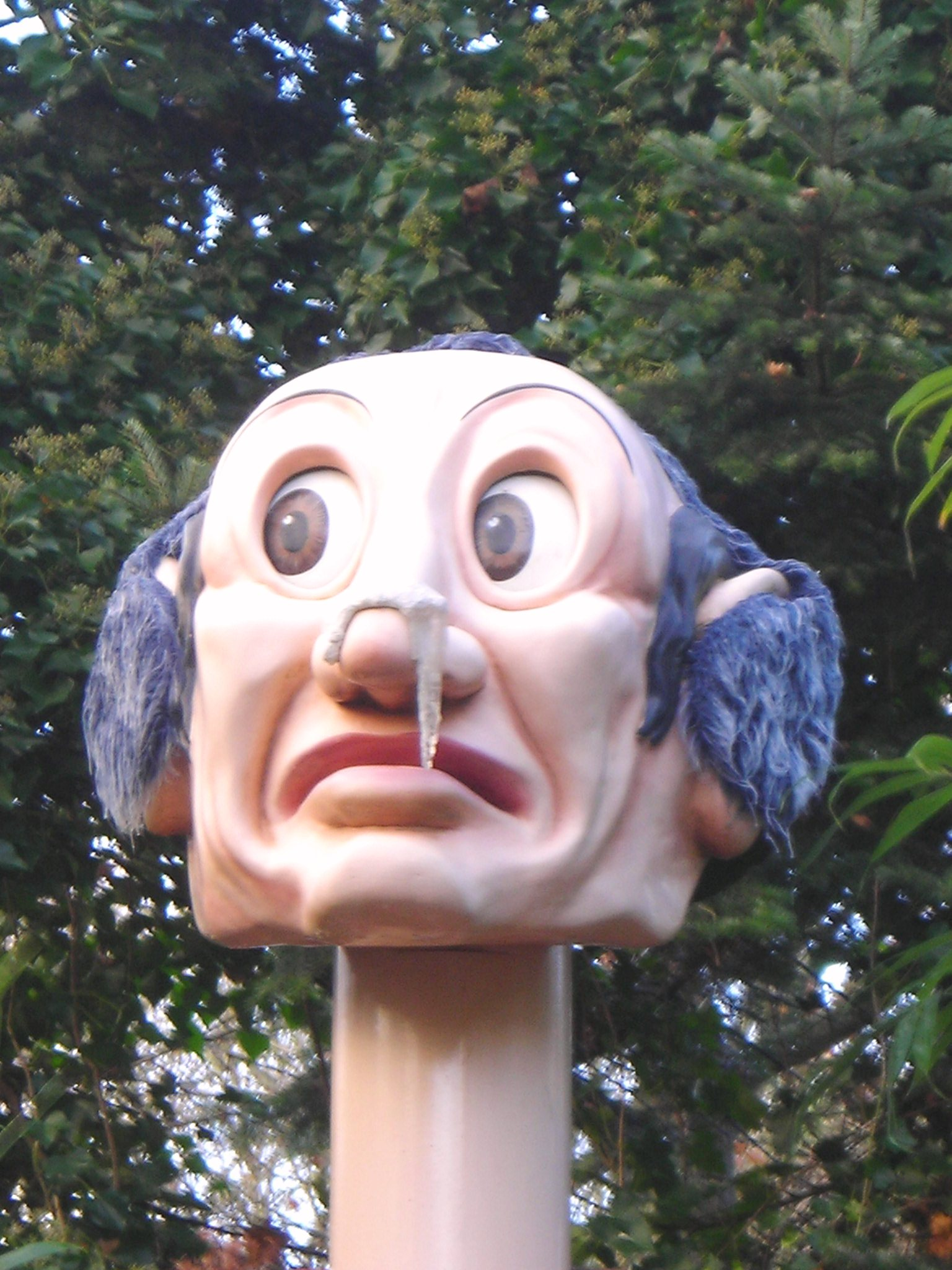
Langnek during the Winter Efteling

Langnek is designed as a giant sitting on a rock, stretching its 4.8-meter-long neck and looking around with its head and eyes. Langnek wears yellow upper clothing, green pants, a red cloak, and red shoes. In the background, the voice of Peter Reijnders can be heard narrating the fairy tale of The Six Servants, accompanied by the music piece "In The Moonlight" by Albert Ketèlbey. When Langnek's neck is retracted, it is located in a tube beneath the rock. A motor behind the rock moves the neck up or down.

During the Winter Efteling, Langnek is dressed in winter clothes like a scarf and earmuffs. Icicles also hang from its nose, with decorations changing every year.

Langnek has grown into an iconic figure at the park and is used for a wide variety of merchandise., and more. Langnek also appears in park theaters and on television in the series Fairy Tale Tree.

== History ==
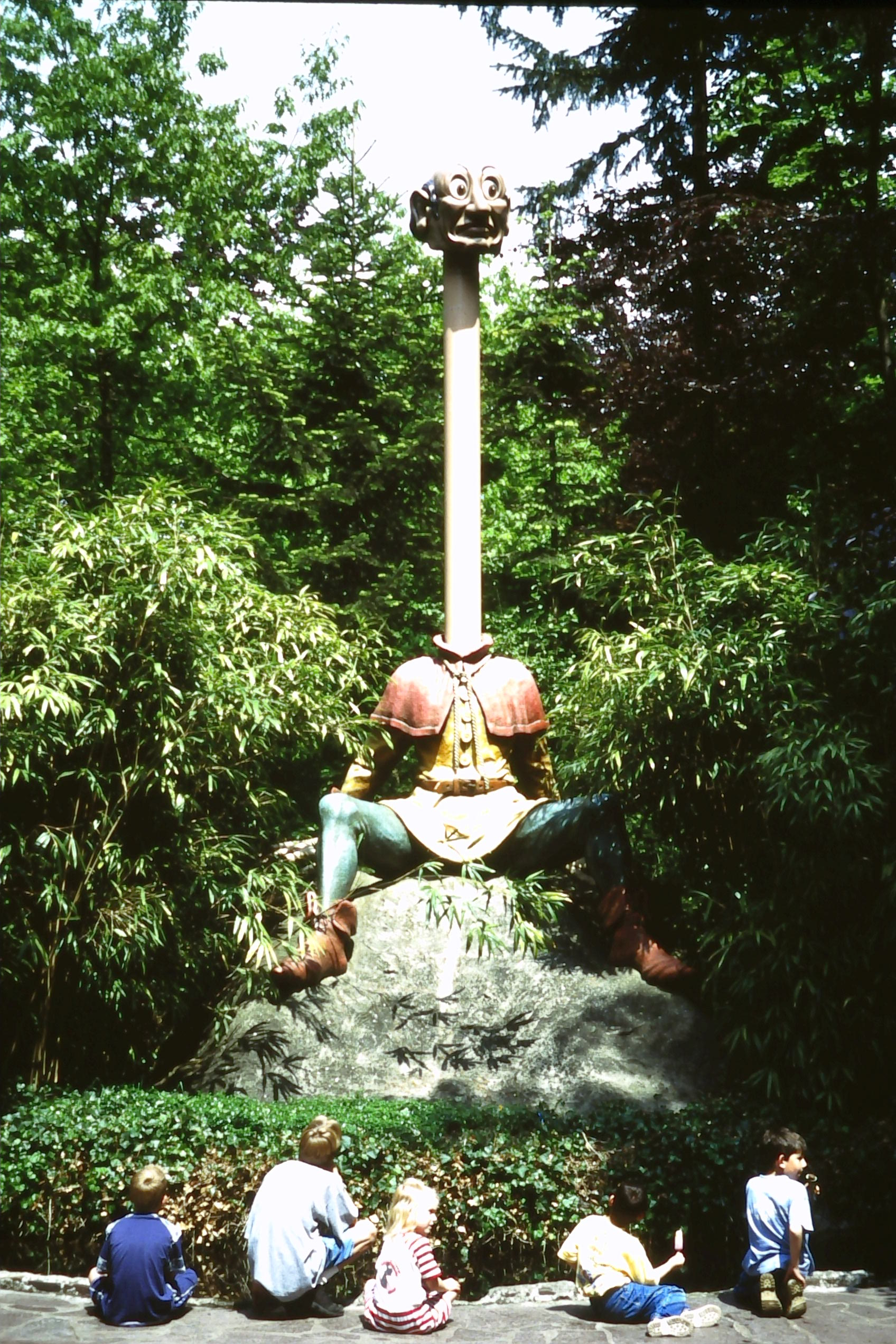
Langnek in the 1990s

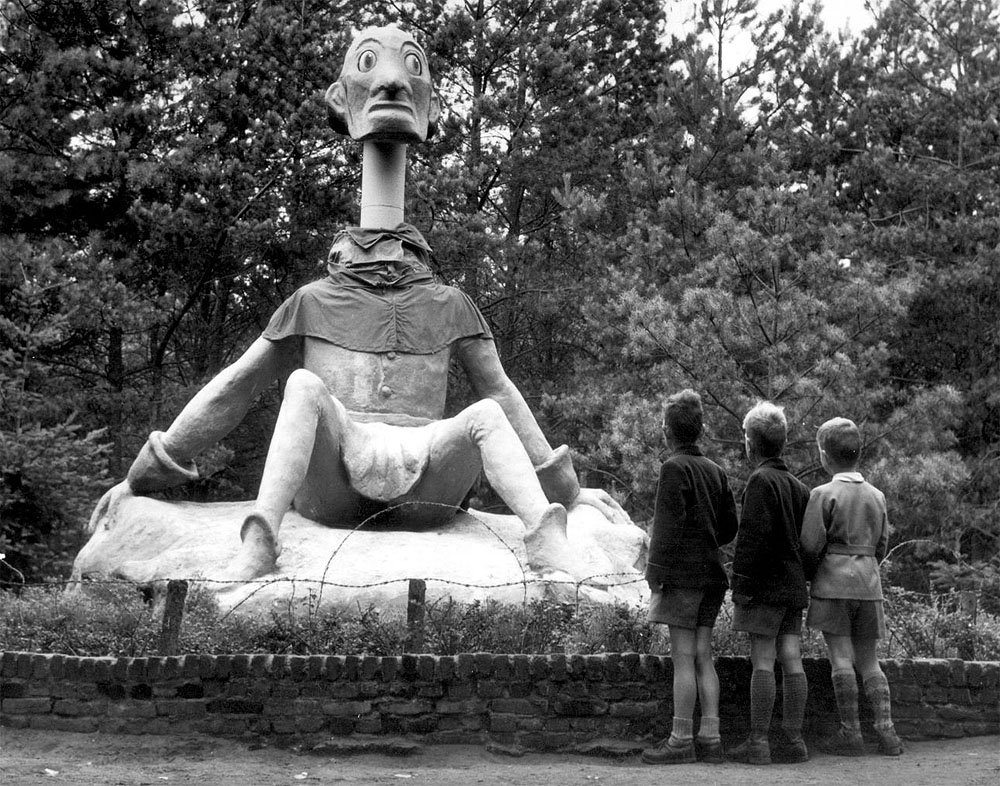
Langnek in 1955

Langnek is one of the first ten fairy tale attractions that opened the Fairy Tale Forest in 1952. In the early years, Langnek was also referred to as "Lange Jan" by the park. Two years later, in 1954, the character Kogeloog from The Six Servants was also placed in the Fairy Tale Forest. Kogeloog stood behind Langnek in the location where The Little Mermaid now stands. Kogeloog consisted of a static bust of a head with a wasp on its nose. In 1955, a pond was dug in front of the scene. In 1967, the gallery opposite Langnek, which was used as a shelter from rain, was transformed into a food service point named Kogeloog. At the same time, Wagon Gijs, one of the Holle Bolle Gijs characters, was introduced. It is the second-oldest Holle Bolle Gijs in Efteling. In February 1968, Langnek's head was stolen by unknown individuals. The original figure was designed by Anton Pieck. In the 1970s, several modifications were made to Langnek to make it appear more realistic. The 1970s version was designed by Ton van de Ven. In 2000, a fairy tale book was placed near Langnek that briefly describes the story of The Six Servants in four languages. Two years later, in 2002, the Kogeloog food service point closed, though the building remained. That same year, a scale model of Langnek and Wagon Gijs was added to Madurodam in The Hague. In April 2013, Langnek underwent a major maintenance overhaul. Since the first Winter Efteling, Langnek has been dressed in earmuffs every winter. In 2018, the earmuffs were replaced by a knitted hat made on 14 November at the Ice Palace. Due to the increasing number of visitors to Efteling, the Kogeloog food service point reopened in 2019. In 2022, Langnek celebrated its 70th anniversary, with a festive hat placed on it. In 2023, Langnek underwent a maintenance overhaul that lasted several weeks, during which the scene was repainted.
