= How the Hermit Helped to Win the King's Daughter =

Italian fairy tale

How the Hermit Helped to Win the King's Daughter is an Italian fairy tale, collected by Laura Gonzenbach in Sicilianische Märchen. Andrew Lang included it in The Pink Fairy Book.

== Synopsis ==
A rich man divided his property among his three sons when he died.

The king offered his daughter to whoever built a ship that traveled over both land and sea. The oldest son tried, and when old men came to beg for work, sent them all away. He spent all his money on it, and a squall destroyed it. The second son tried after him, but ended up the same.

The youngest thought to try as well, because he was not rich enough to support all three of them. He hired everyone, included a little old man with a white beard whom his brothers had rejected but whom he appointed as overseer. This old man was a holy hermit. When the ship was done, he told the youngest son to lay claim to the princess. The youngest son asked him to stay with him, and the hermit asked him for half of everything he got. The son agreed.

As they traveled, they came across a man putting fog in a sack, and at the hermit's suggestion, the son asked him to come with them, and so with a man tearing up trees, a man drinking a stream dry, a man shooting a quail in the Underworld, and a man whose steps bestrode an island.

The king did not want to give his daughter to a man of whom he knew nothing. He ordered the son to take a message to the Underworld and back in an hour. The long-legged man brought it, but fell asleep in the Underworld, so the man who could shoot shot him, waking him. The king then demanded a man who could drink half his cellar dry in a day; the man who drank the stream drank the whole cellar dry. The king agreed to the marriage, but promised only as much dowry as one man could carry, though it was unfit for a princess. The strong man, who had torn up trees, carried off every piece of treasure the king had. When the king chased them, the man let the fog from the sack, and they escaped.

The son divided the gold with the hermit, but the hermit pointed out that he had gotten the king's daughter, too. The son drew his sword to cut her in pieces, but the hermit stopped him, and gave him back all the treasure too, promising to come to his aid if ever he needed it.

== See also ==
- Baron Munchausen
- The Clever Little Tailor
- Fair Brow
- The Fool of the World and the Flying Ship
- The Griffin
- How Six Made Their Way in the World
- The King Of Lochlin's Three Daughters
- Long, Broad and Sharpsight
- The Six Servants
