= Adam Gillies, Lord Gillies =

Scottish judge

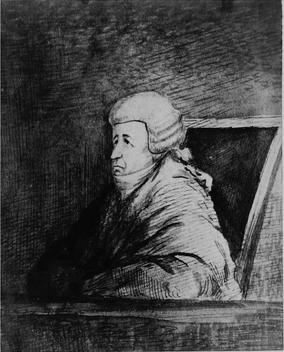
Adam Gillies, Lord Gillies by Robert Scott Moncrieff.

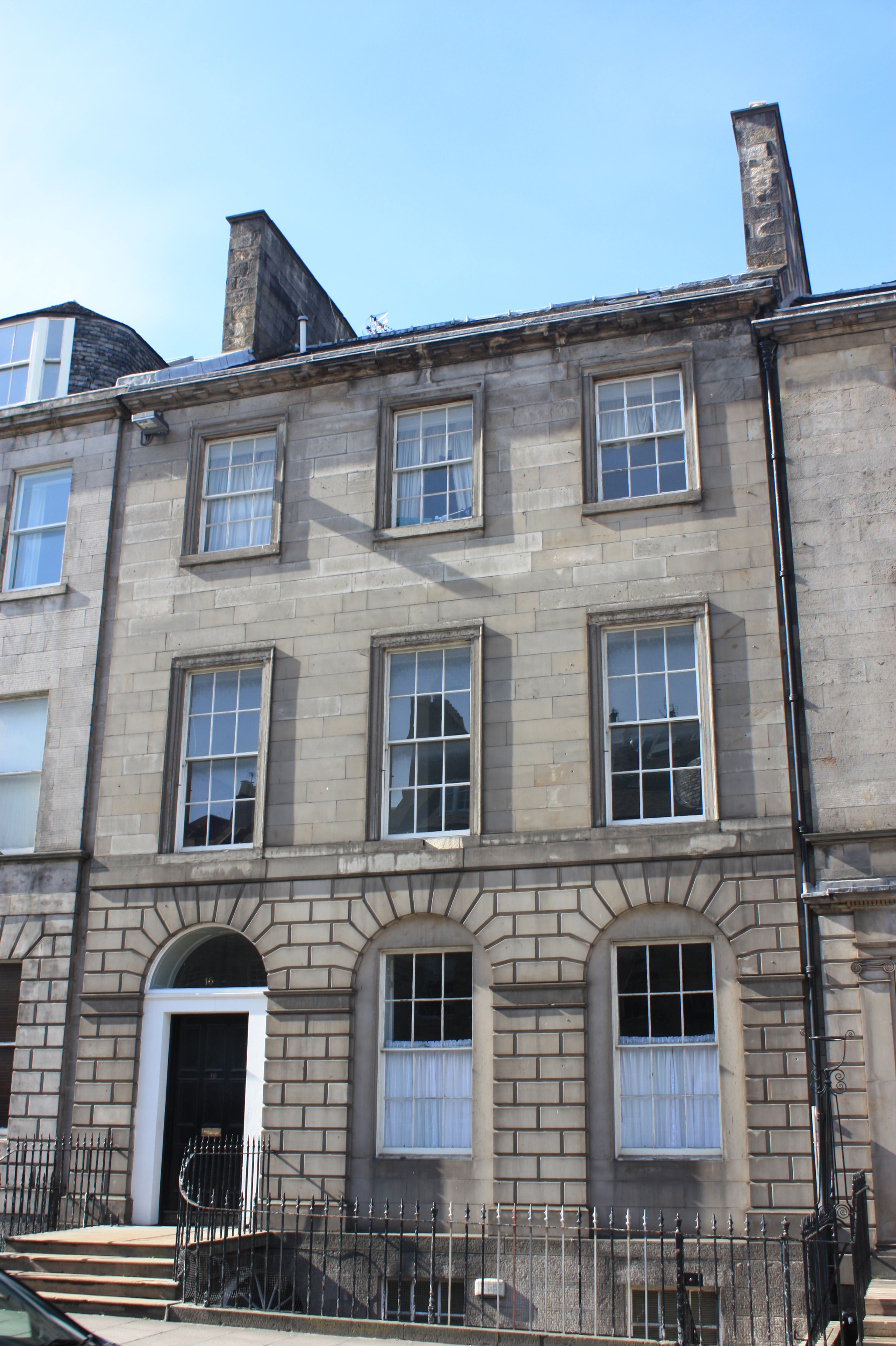
Lord Gillies' Edinburgh townhouse at 16 York Place

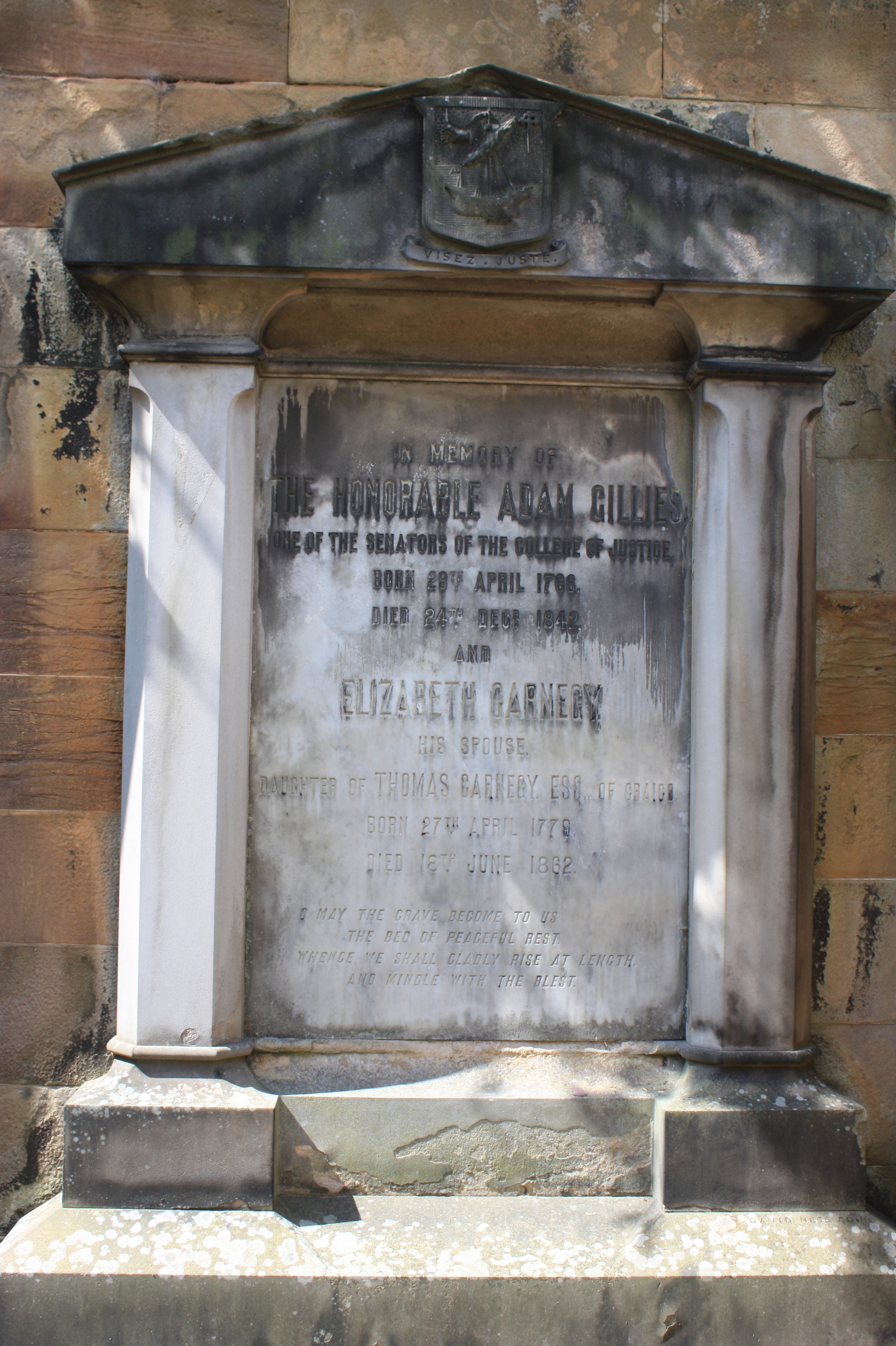
The grave of Adam Gillies, Greyfriars Kirkyard.

Adam Gillies, Lord Gillies (1760–1842) was a Scottish judge.

== Life ==
He was born in Brechin, Forfarshire on 29 April 1766, the son of Margaret (née Smith) and Robert Gillies of Little Keithock. Adam was the younger brother of historian John Gillies.

Gillies was admitted an advocate on 14 July 1787. From 1806, he was the sheriff-depute of Kincardineshire. From 1811 to 1842, he was a Senator of the College of Justice, based in Edinburgh. In the 1830s he is listed as living at 16 York Place in Edinburgh's New Town.

In the late 18th century he was a member of the Crochallan Fencibles, a club which met at Dawney's Tavern on Anchor Close in Edinburgh.

Gillies retired due to ill health in the summer of 1842. His position as Senator was filled by Alexander Wood, Lord Wood.

He died on 24 December 1842 at Leamington Spa.

His body was returned to Edinburgh and he was buried in a private vault in the now sealed south-west section of Greyfriars Kirkyard known as the Covenanter's Prison. His wife Elizabeth lies with him.

== Family ==
Gillies married Elizabeth Carnegy, daughter of Thomas Carnegy of Craigo and a Unitarian. From 1811 their nieces Margaret (1803-1887) and Mary Gillies (1800-1870), came to live with them from London. The girls were educated by Lord and Lady Gillies and introduced into Edinburgh society. During their time in Edinburgh the two girls were introduced to Thomas Southwood Smith, the powerful new preacher to the Unitarian congregation at Skinners' Hall, Canongate, who was to play a large part in their later lives.

His wife's sister Margaret married Malcolm Laing.

== See also ==
- List of historic Senators of the College of Justice
