= E. H. Wehnert =

English painter

Edward Henry Wehnert (1813–1868) was an English-born painter of landscape, genre and historical subjects, now best remembered for his illustrations in books and magazines.

== Life and work ==
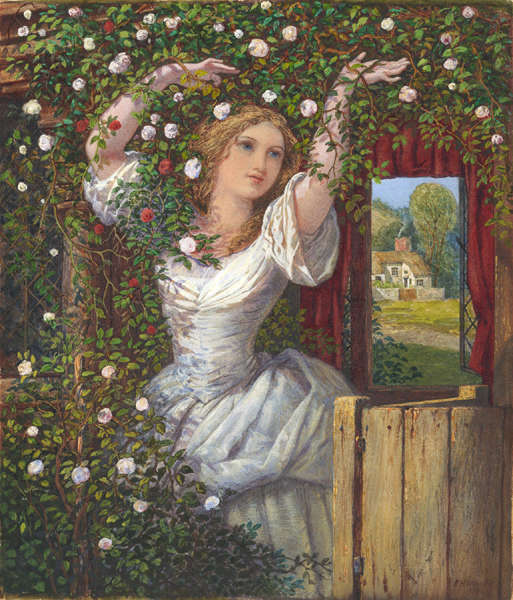
A watercolour by Wehnert showing Pre-Raphaelite influence, 1860

The artist was born in London of German parents in 1813 and christened at St Anne's Church, Soho, on 14 February. He was educated at Göttingen University and received his art training chiefly in Paris, where and in Jersey he resided from 1832 to 1837. While in Jersey he taught John Everett Millais, shortly before the youngster left to pursue his art education in London, and also painted some topographical views. Wehnert then returned to England himself after joining the recently founded New Society of Painters in Watercolours, to the exhibitions of which he was subsequently a constant contributor. Among these was “The Gardener’s Daughter” (1860), which was obviously influenced by the Pre-Raphaelite themes favoured by his former pupil, Millais, with whom he had kept in contact. Among his other close friends were the sculptor Alfred Stevens and the wood-engraver William James Linton.

His drawings were all of an historical character, among the best being "Luther reading his Sermon to some Friends", "The Death of Wickliffe" (1846), "George Fox preaching in a tavern" and "Caxton examining the first proof sheet from his press" (1850). Wehnert's large works, though excellently conceived and drawn, were unattractive in colour and did not readily find purchasers. He was more successful as a designer of book illustrations. Among the many for which he furnished the drawings were Grimm's Fairy Tales (1853); Keats's Eve of St. Agnes (1856); Coleridge's Ancient Mariner (1857); The Pilgrim's Progress (1858); Hans Christian Andersen's Fairy Tales (1861); Robinson Crusoe (1862); and Edgar Allan Poe's Poetical Works (1865).

Neighbours of his in Fortess Terrace, Kentish Town were the physician and sanitary reformer Thomas Southwood Smith, his partner, the artist Margaret Gillies and her sister, the children's writer Mary Gillies for whom he illustrated two books, Great Fun for our little friends (1862) and More Fun for our little Friends (1863).

Wehnert contributed to the Westminster Hall cartoon exhibition in 1845 an allegorical drawing of "Justice".

He died at Fortess Terrace, on 15 September 1868 and was buried on the eastern side of Highgate Cemetery. His grave (plot no.16238) is now unmarked.

There is a collection of his work at the Victoria & Albert Museum, for which he also designed a mosaic.

== Note ==
The bulk of the information here is taken from the article by Freeman Marius O'Donoghue in the Dictionary of National Biography, 1885–1900, Volume 60, a work in the public domain.
