= Octavia Hill Birthplace House =

Museum located in Wisbech in Cambridgeshire, England

Coordinates: 52.6646°N 0.1570°E

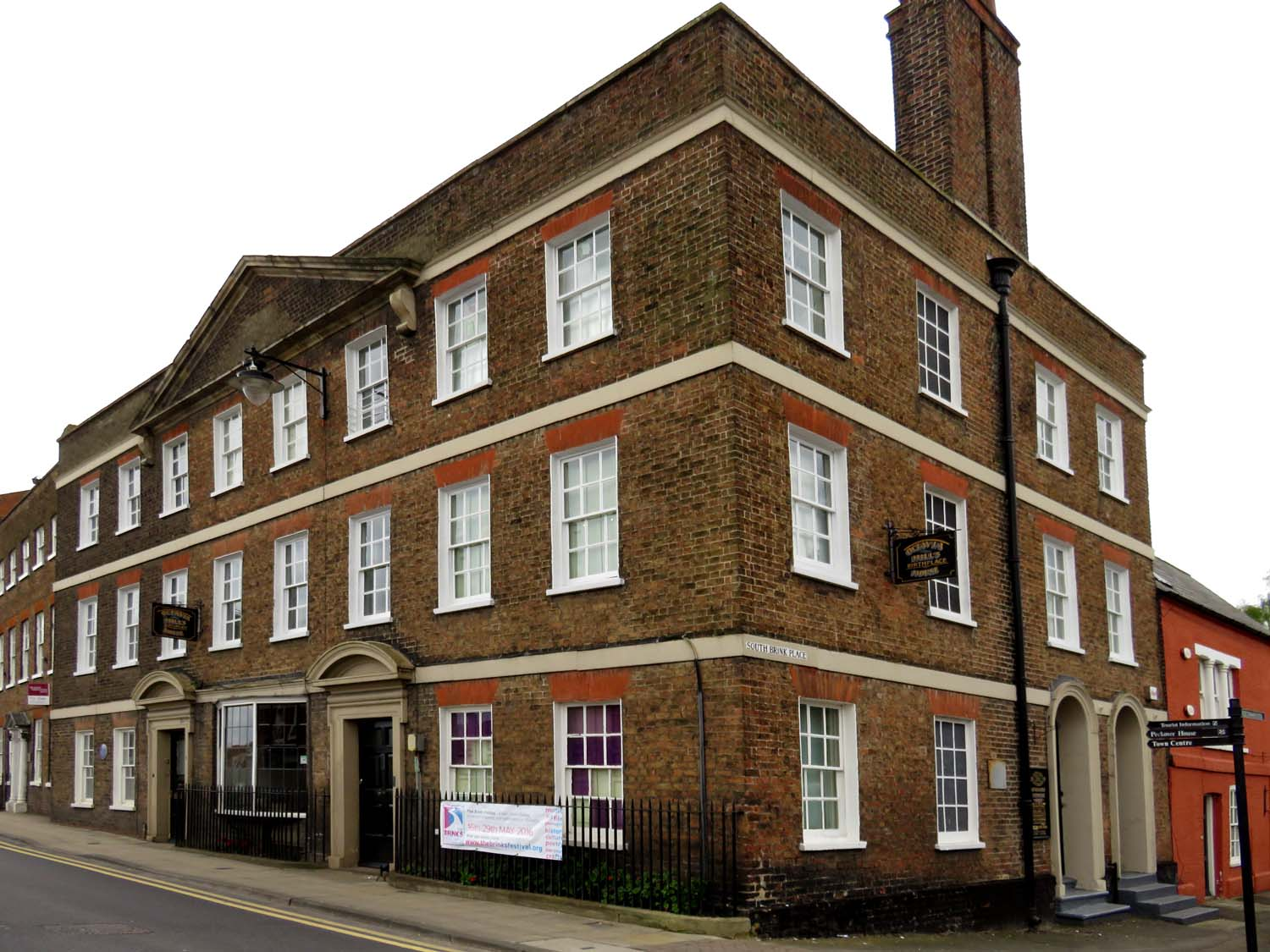
Octavia Hill's birthplace museum

Octavia Hill Birthplace House is a historic house museum located in South Brink, of Wisbech, Cambridgeshire England. It is an independent museum and a Grade II* listed building.

== History ==
The most well-known owner was the nonconformist James Hill (c.1800–1871), banker, corn merchant and a follower of Robert Owen, the social utopian. James Hill's third wife was the writer and educationalist Caroline Southwood Hill (1809–1902), daughter of Dr Thomas Southwood Smith.

Their daughter Octavia Hill, social reformer and co-founder of the National Trust, spent her infancy here, hence the name of the museum. The Octavia Hill Society was established in 1992 and one aim was to create a museum to collect, exhibit, preserve, interpret and document materials that reflect her work and to act as a focal centre for the Society in her birthplace town.

== The present building ==
After the Hill family moved out, the building was divided and sold, remaining divided until the museum reunited the parts. Peter Clayton MBE was instrumental in establishing this museum. There are two blue plaques on the building, one was placed when the museum was created and the second after the Army Cadet rooms were created.

The museum holds an extensive library of books connected with Hill and her family. There are also items both old and new celebrating her work.
