= Richard Henry Horne =

English poet and critic (1802–1884)

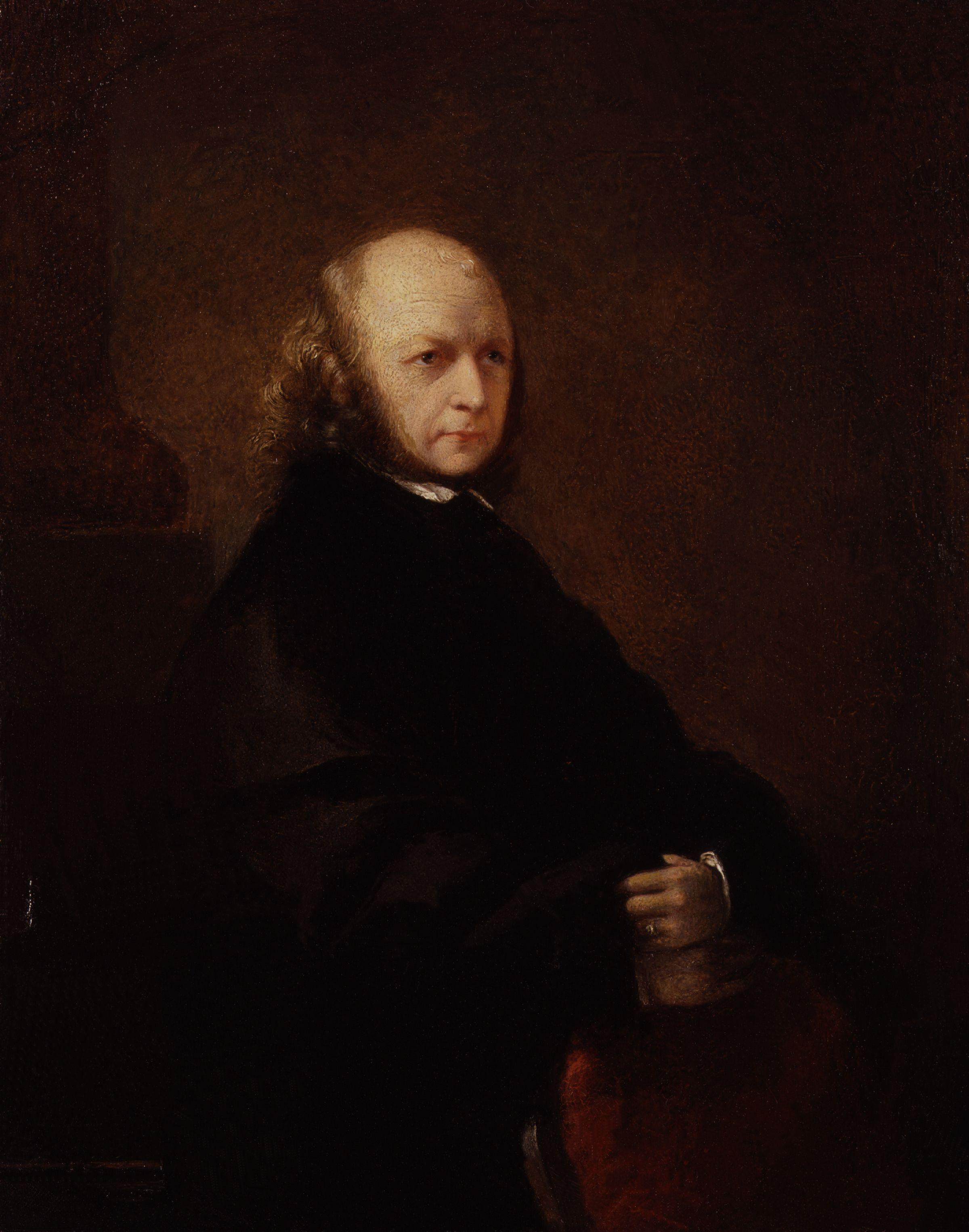
Richard Henry (or Hengist) Horne by Margaret Gillies, c. 1840

Richard Hengist Horne (born Richard Henry Horne) (31 December 1802 – 13 March 1884) was an English poet and critic most famous for his poem Orion.

== Early life ==
On New Year's Eve of 1802, Horne was born at Edmonton, London, son of James Horne, a quarter-master in the 61st Regiment. The family moved to Guernsey, where James was stationed, until James' death on 16 April 1810. Horne was raised at the home of his rich paternal grandmother. In 1825 he went as a midshipman in the Libertad to fight for Mexican independence, was taken prisoner, and joined the Mexican navy.

== Early career ==
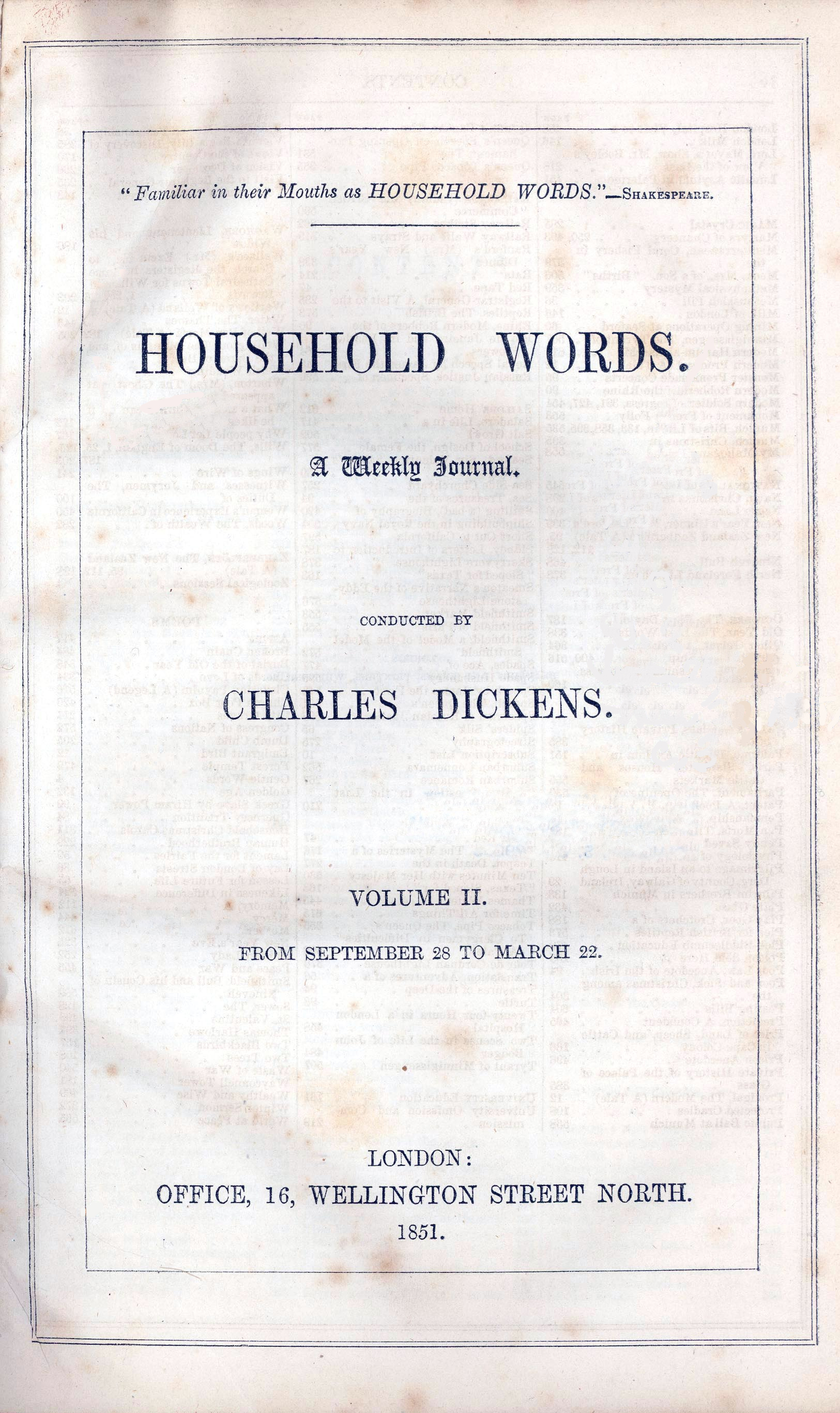
Horne was employed by Charles Dickens as "sub-editor" of Household Words in 1849

Horne became a journalist, and from 1836 to 1837 edited the Monthly Repository. In 1837 he published two tragedies, Cosmo de' Medici and The Death of Marlowe.

In the early 1840s, Horne did work for the Royal Commission of Inquiry into Children's Employment which investigated the conditions of child labourers working in coal mines. He compiled the Commission's 1842 report, the publication of which led to the passage of the Mines and Collieries Act, which banned children from being employed in mines, that same year.

For many years Horne lived with the writer Mary Gillies, sharing houses in Upper Montagu Street, 5 Fortess Terrace, (later renamed 40 Fortess Road) Kentish Town and Hillside, Fitzroy Park Highgate, with her sister, the artist Margaret Gillies and her partner, the physician and reformer Thomas Southwood Smith. This cohabitation of two unmarried women with their partners, one of whom was himself married, was calmly accepted by some but shocked many who ostracised them.

In 1847 Horne married Catherine Foggo (daughter of David Foggo) and they lived at Beaumont Cottage, Adelaide Road, Hampstead but their marriage was not a happy one. Catherine died in 1893 and shares a grave in Highgate Cemetery with Mary Gillies.

In December 1849 Horne's acquaintance Charles Dickens gave him a position as a sub-editor on his new weekly magazine Household Words at a salary of "five guineas a week". In 1852 with Horne's marriage failing and being discontented with his work on Household Words, he decided to emigrate to Australia.

== Australia ==
In June 1852 Horne migrated to the Colony of Victoria in Australia, travelling as a passenger on the same ship as William Howitt and arriving in Melbourne in September. With assistance from Captain Archibald Chisholm (husband of Caroline Chisholm, a contributor to Household Words), he was given a position as commander of a gold escort. It was later reported that on the first trip of the escort under Horne's command they returned to Melbourne with "two tons weight of gold". The escort was robbed in 1853 and Horne wrote to The Argus with his recollections of George Melville, the bushranger convicted of the crime and hanged.

In 1854 he was a Goldfields Commissioner at the Waranga goldrush (during the Victorian gold rush) and named the township of Rushworth. During his time there he also reached a peaceful settlement with over 4,000 gold miners who had rioted over the payment of their mining license fee and, in his memoirs, stated that he believed this action, in light of the events at the Eureka Stockade a few months later, was never adequately recognised.

During his time at Rushworth, as part of a "foolhardy business transaction", Horne had invested in blocks of land at nearby Murchison on the Goulburn River. But as "the village grew slowly" he was eager to "promote any venture which might bring prosperity to the district" and joined with his friend, Rushworth storekeeper Ludovic Marie in establishing a vineyard on the river near Nagambie. The two set up a public company, the Goulburn Vineyard Proprietary, with Marie as manager and Horne as honorary secretary. A third partner "died mysteriously in the Melbourne scrub" but the venture lasted and still exists as the Tahbilk winery. The venture didn't compensate Horne for the money he had lost in an early public float but he later claimed "he was the father of the Australian wine industry".

In 1856, he was an unsuccessful candidate for the Victorian Electoral district of Rodney. In his platform of policies was an ambitious proposal for an irrigation system, which was realised with the construction of the Waranga Basin in the 1900s.

He lost the position "as a consequence of departmental changes" and was promised another "by successive Governments" however this did not eventuate. He "wasted three years and upwards, in fruitless expectation", and, with his capital tied up in Goulburn River investments, he applied to the Royal Literary Fund, of London, where he "was at once recognised, and a handsome assistance transmitted to him by return mail".

Along with such literary figures as Henry Kendall, Adam Lindsay Gordon, George Gordon McCrae and Marcus Clarke he was a member of the Yorick Club where members met and discussed literature.

Horne was the founding President of Melbourne's Garrick Club in the 1850s and at a charitable theatrical fundraiser in 1855 "kindly consented to sing a Spanish Romansa and Serence" between the two short plays.

== London and later life ==
In 1860 Horne was again unemployed. A later memoria of Horne notes that after his return from Australia he settled in "poor quarters in Marylebone" and "ill at ease in London" his health suffered. This included "a melancholy increase in weight" that resulted in "V-shaped additions" having to be added to his trousers to accommodate his girth. However, courtesy of his physician, Dr. Bird, of Welbeck Street, his health returned and one day two ladies entering the Doctor's practice "were startled to see an old gentleman sliding headfirst down the banisters. This was Mr. Horne celebrating his return to health."

== Legacy and influence ==
Horne possessed extraordinary versatility, but, except in the case of Orion, he never attained to a very high degree of distinction. That poem, indeed, has much of the quality of fine poetry; it is earnest, vivid and alive with spirit. But Horne early drove his talent too hard, and continued to write when he had little left to say. In criticism he had insight and quickness. He was one of the first to appreciate Keats and Tennyson, and he gave valuable encouragement to Mrs. Browning when she was still Miss Elizabeth Barrett.

Hornes's epic poem, Orion was reprinted by the Scholartis Press in 1928.

He has been the subject of two biographies:

- Always morning: the life of Richard Henry "Orion" Horne by Cyril Pearl (1960)
- The farthing poet: a biography of Richard Hengist Horne, 1802–84; a lesser literary lion by Ann Blainey (1968)
