= Long, Broad and Sharpsight =

Bohemian fairy tale

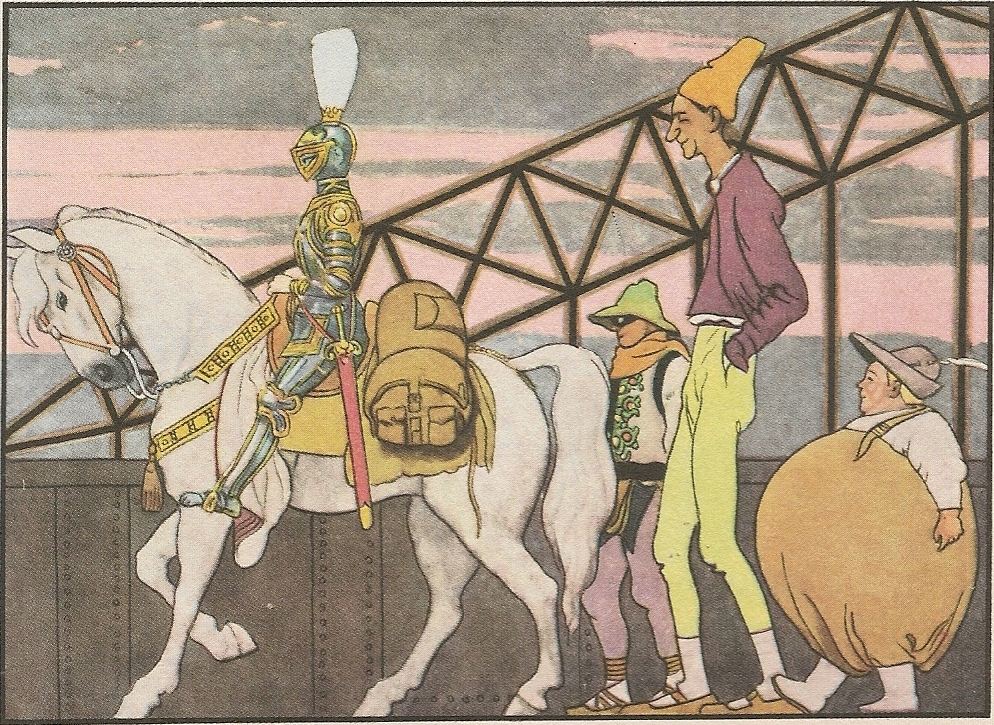
Three companions with the prince on horseback: Sharpsight, Long and Broad (Artuš Scheiner, 1925)

Long, Broad and Sharpsight or Long, Broad, and Quickeye is a Bohemian fairy tale, collected and published by Karel Jaromír Erben in 1865 in Sto prostonarodních pohádek a pověstí slovanských and also by Louis Léger in Contes Populaires Slaves (1882).

== Synopsis ==
An aging king tells his one son that he wishes to see him married before he dies. The son replies that he does not know a suitable bride, so the king sends him to a tower room that has not been opened in years. There he finds windows showing beautiful women, and a curtain over one window. He pulls away the curtain and falls in love with the woman he sees there. He tells his father, who tells him he should have left that window curtained, because the woman is the prisoner of an evil sorcerer, in an iron castle, but the prince has given his word and must try to rescue her.

On the way, he meets a man who wants to be taken into his service; his name is Long, and he can extend himself, and shows it by taking down a nest from a tall tree. The prince lets him come along. He also meets Broad, who can make himself grow until he is as large as a mountain, and Sharpsight, who keeps his eyes bandaged because he can see through the bandage, and without it his gaze would set things afire, or break them into pieces. The prince takes them into his service as well.

They reach the iron castle, and as soon as they are inside, the gates close. They find many men, turned to stone, and food laid out. As nobody is there, they eat the food. The sorcerer appears with the woman and tells them they can have the princess if they could keep her from escaping for three nights. The prince tries to talk to her, but she does not answer. As the trio falls asleep, she vanishes, but Sharpsight spots her; she has turned into an acorn on an oak tree. Long brings her back. The wizard is furious. The next day, she becomes a precious stone on a mountain, but again Sharpsight sees her, and Long brings her back. The wizard is furious again. The third night, she becomes a golden ring on a shell in the sea. Long brings Broad with him, and Broad, making himself broad, drinks up the sea, while Long gets the ring. On the way back, however, he cannot carry Broad, but drops him. All the water comes out, and Broad barely manages to avoid drowning, but they eventually make it back.

The sorcerer turns into a crow, and all the people turned to stone comes back to life. The prince takes the woman home and marries her. Long, Broad, and Sharpsight leave his service and go on to seek their fortune.

== Translations and versions ==
Slavicist Louis Léger translated the tale as Long, Large et Clairvoyant, in his Contes Populaires Slaves, and indicated its origin as Czech.

Andrew Lang included the tale in The Grey Fairy Book, as Long, Broad and Quickeye, and A. H. Wratislaw collected it in his Sixty Folk-Tales from Exclusively Slavonic Sources, as Long, Broad and Sharpsight. Both listed the tale as Bohemian.

Evaline Ness adapted and illustrated Andrew Lang's version, titled the same Long, Broad & Quickeye.

Jeremiah Curtin translated the tale as Long, Broad and Swift Glance, in his book Fairy Tales of Eastern Europe.

Parker Fillmore translated the tale as Longshanks, Girth, and Keen: The Story of Three Wonderful Serving Men, after the physical characteristics of the wondrous companions.

Another version exists with the title The Broad Man, the Tall Man and the Man with Eyes of Flame.

The tale is also known as Broadman, Longfellow and Sharp Eyes.

Walter William Strickland translated the tale as Long, Broad and Sharp-Eyes.

The tale was also collected in German with the name Der Lange, der Breite und der Scharfäugige, by Josef Wenzig.

Another version of the tale appears in A Book of Wizards by Ruth Manning-Sanders.

Roger Lancelyn Green translated the tale in Once Long Ago, titled "Long, Stout and Sharpeyes."

It was appeared in animated short film, Perníkový Dědek which is directed by Dagmar Doubkova.

They appear in the animated film "Goat Story 2" voiced by Miroslav Táborský, Michal Dlouhý and Miroslav Vladyka respectively.

== See also ==
- The Enchanted Pig
- Trusty John
- How Six Made Their Way in the World
- How the Hermit helped to win the King's Daughter
- The Fool of the World and the Flying Ship
- The King Of Lochlin's Three Daughters
- The Six Servants
