= Marian Emma Chase =

British artist (1844–1905)

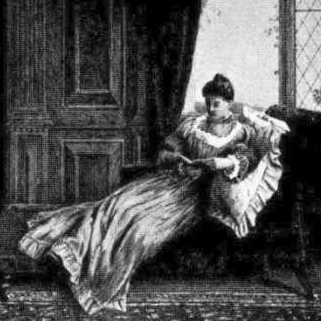
- Born: 18 April 1844; Fitzroy Square, London, England
- Died: 15 March 1905 (aged 60); London, England
- Known for: Water colours

Marian Emma Chase (8 April 1844 – 15 March 1905) was a British painter, water colour artist and draftsperson. She is best known for her flower, fruit and still-life watercolour paintings. The Victoria and Albert Museum holds one of her works.

== Life ==
Chase was born on 18 April 1844, in Fitzroy Square, in London, to John and his second wife, Georgiana Ann Chase (born Harris). His first wife, Mary Ann Rix, had been a water colour artist, had died in 1840. Chase's father, John Chase, was an established artist who had been trained in part by John Constable.

Chase went to school in Richmond and was taught by her father as well as by Margaret Gillies. She worked mostly in England and although she did exhibit at other galleries she sent the vast majority of her water colours to the Royal Institute of Painters in Water Colours.

In early life, Chase devoted a good deal of time to illuminating, but it was as a painter in water-colour of flowers, fruit, and still-life that she made her mark, by virtue of her truthful colouring and delicate treatment. She painted in the same medium interiors, a few landscapes, and, towards the close of her life, studies of flower-gardens; in her figure subjects she was less successful. She also occasionally worked in oil.

She exhibited from 1866 to 1905, at the Royal Academy, the Royal Society of British Artists, the Royal Institute, the Dudley Gallery, the Grosvenor Gallery, the International Exhibition of 1871 and various provincial, colonial, and foreign exhibitions. On 22 March 1875, she was elected an associate of the Institute of Painters in Water Colours (now the Royal Institute of Painters in Water Colours), and in 1879 she became a full member. In 1878, she contributed drawings and watercolours to the journal "The Garden". In 1888, the Royal Horticultural Society awarded her a silver medal.

Chase died on 15 March 1905, aged 60, in London, after a heart operation. She is buried in St. Pancras Cemetery.

Chase's work is in the Victoria and Albert Museum, the Aberdeen Art Gallery and the Leicester Galleries.

=== Gallery ===
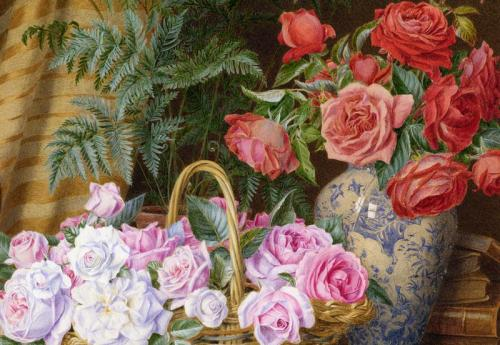
Roses, Aberdeen Art Gallery

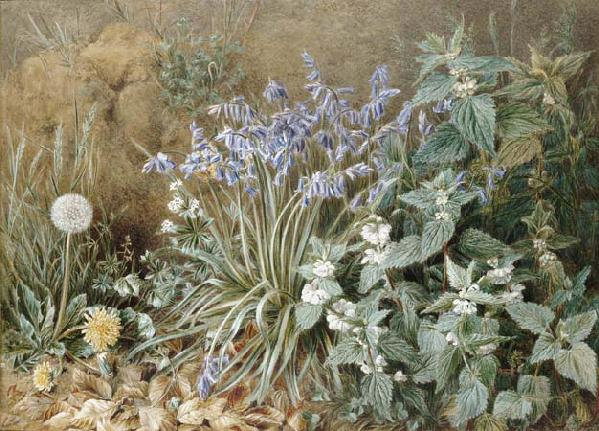
Wild Flowers (1905)

== Sources ==
- Long, B. S.; Yeldham, Charlotte. "Chase, Marian Emma (1844–1905)". Oxford Dictionary of National Biography (online ed.). Oxford University Press. doi:10.1093/ref:odnb/32379. (Subscription, Wikipedia Library access or UK public library membership required.)
