= James Purves (minister) =

Scottish universalist minister

James Purves (1734–1795) was a Scottish universalist minister.

== Life ==
He was born at Blackadder, near Edrington, Berwickshire, on 23 September 1734. His father, a shepherd, died in 1754. On 1 December 1755 he was admitted to membership in a religious society at Chirnside, Berwickshire; it was one of several "fellowship societies" formed by James Fraser of Brae. They had joined the Reformed Presbytery in 1743, but separated from it in 1753, as holders of the doctrine of universal atonement (this split occurred at the death of John Macmillan, and they were without a fixed ministry).

Purves in 1756 bound himself apprentice to his uncle, a wright in Duns, Berwickshire. He read Isaac Watts's Dissertation on the Logos, 1726, and adopted the doctrine of the pre-existence of the human soul of Christ. In 1763 the Berwickshire societies sent him as their commissioner to Coleraine, County Londonderry, to consult with a branch of the Irish secession church holding similar doctrines. A minute expressing concurrence of doctrine was signed at Coleraine by John Hopkins, Samuel Lind, and Purves.

In 1769 the Berwickshire societies decided to qualify one of their members as a public preacher. Three candidates delivered trial discourses on 8 June 1769; one of these withdrew from membership: of the remaining two, Purves was selected by lot (27 July), and sent to Glasgow College. Here he learned some Latin, and Greek and Hebrew so as to read the scriptures in the originals. In 1771 a statement of principles drawn up by Purves was adopted by the societies. Its theology was high Arian, but its distinctive position was the duty of free inquiry into the scriptures, unbiassed by creed. This document led to controversy with ministers of the Reformed Presbytery.

In 1776 several members of the Berwickshire societies, headed by Alexander Forton or Fortune, migrated to Edinburgh and established a religious society, calling themselves "successors of the remnant who testified against the revolution constitution". Purves joined them on their invitation. he supported himself by teaching, and on 15 November 1776 was elected pastor. The site of his school and place of worship at Broughton, then near Edinburgh, was later taken by St. Paul's episcopal chapel, York Place, Edinburgh. In 1777 hemoved his residence to Wright's Houses, Bruntsfield Links, Edinburgh.

Purves came to know Thomas Fyshe Palmer in 1786, sharing his politics, but not his theological positions. In 1792 the worship of the society, in the Barbers' Hall, Edinburgh, was made public, and the name "universalist dissenters" was adopted, and a declaration of opinions was issued. From 1793 the reading of scripture lessons was made a part of the public services, a practice not then common in Scotland; members were at the same time encouraged to deliver public exhortations, preliminary to the minister's discourse. Purves's congregations were very small; but he preached three time every Sunday, and advocated his views through the press. His earlier tracts were printed with his own hand, and he cast the Hebrew type for them.

In the autumn of 1794 Purves ceased to preach. He died on 1 February 1795 and was buried in the Calton cemetery. His grave was in a portion of the cemetery removed in the construction of Regent Road. His congregation was without a minister till the appointment (November 1812) of Thomas Southwood Smith; it later moved to St. Mark's Chapel, Castle Terrace, Edinburgh.

== Works ==
Purves published:

- A Short Abstract of the Principles … of the United Societies in Scotland. … By the said Societies, &c., no place or printer 1771.
- An Inquiry into the Institution and End of Civil Government, &c., no place or printer, 1775,
- Observations on Prophetic Time and Similitudes, &c., Edinburgh, pt. i. 1777; pt. ii. no place, 1778.
- Observations on the Conduct of … the Reformed Presbytery, &c., Edinburgh, 1778; this includes A Short Letter to Mr. Fairly (24 April 1772), An Extract from a Letter to Mr. Thorburn (July 1777), and A Copy of the Letter sent to Mr. John M'Millan (24 October 1777, by Alexander Forton).
- The Original Text and a Translation of the Forty-sixth Psalm, with Annotations, &c., Edinburgh, 1779.
- A Hebrew Grammar without Points, &c., Edinburgh, 1779.
- An Essay toward a … Translation of some parts of the Hebrew Scriptures, &c., Edinburgh, 1780, (anon.; three numbers issued).
- An Humble Attempt to investigate … the Scripture Doctrine concerning the Father, the Son, and the Holy Spirit, &c., 2nd edit. Edinburgh and London, 1784.
- Eight Letters between the Buchanites and a Teacher near Edinburgh, &c., Edinburgh, 1785.
- A Scheme of the Lives of the Patriarchs, 1785.
- Concise Catechism with Scripture Answers, &c., Edinburgh, 1787, (anon.).
- An Humble Enquiry into Faith and Regeneration, &c., Edinburgh, 1788.
- A Dissertation on the Seals, the Trumpets, and the Vials … in the Book of Revelation, &c., Edinburgh, 1788.
- A Letter to Mr. John Dick, &c., Berwick, 1788 (anon.; criticises a sermon by John Dick, on the case of William M'Gill).
- Observations on the Visions of the Apostle John, &c., Edinburgh, vol. i. 1789, (maps); vol. ii. 1793, (plans).
- Some Observations on Socinian Arguments, &c., Edinburgh, 1790.
- A Treatise on Civil Government, &c., Edinburgh, 1791 (in sympathy with the French revolution; the writer's name is given on the title-page as "Sevrup Semaj").
- A Declaration of the Religious Opinions of the Universalist Dissenters, Edinburgh, 1792.
- A Short Representation of Religious Principles, &c. [1793?].

Posthumous were:

- A Review of the Age of Reason, &c., Edinburgh, 1795, pt. i. (the second part was never written).
- An Enquiry concerning … Sacrifices … added, A Letter to T. F. Palmer, B.D., on the State of the Dead, &c., Edinburgh, 1797.

== Views ==
Purves advocated in 1790 the doctrine of the pre-existence of souls, and was a strong believer in the millennium and its near approach. His last work, finished just before his death, was a criticism of deism, in reply to Tom Paine.

== Family ==
Purves married, first, Isobel Blair, by whom he had a daughter Elizabeth (1766–1839), married to Hamilton Dunn; secondly, Sarah Brown, by whom he had a daughter Margaret, married to John Crichton; and, thirdly, Lilias Scott, by whom he had a daughter Mary, who married, in 1801, William Paul, and settled in Boston, Massachusetts. His widow kept a bookseller's shop in St. Patrick's Square, Edinburgh, and subsequently moved to America.
