= John Chase (artist) =

British artist

John Chase (1810–1879) was a British landscape water colour painter.

== Early life ==
Chase was born in John Street, Fitzroy Square, on 26 February 1810. When a child, he received some instruction from John Constable, R.A., and afterwards studied architecture. His earliest attempts in art were elaborate interiors, such as those of Henry VII's Chapel in Westminster Abbey, and St George's Chapel, Windsor Castle.

== Career ==
In 1826, he exhibited (for the first time), in Suffolk Street A View of the Naves of Westminster Abbey. Chase was elected a member of the New Society of Painters in Water-colours (now the Royal Institute of Painters in Water Colours, Piccadilly) in 1835. His daughter Marian Emma Chase was born in 1844 and she was initially trained by her father. She went on to be a notable water colourist. Chase married twice and he had three daughters. Chase died at his residence, 113 Charlotte Street, Fitzroy Square, on 8 January 1879.

His later works combined chiefly landscape and architecture, such as terraced gardens, ruined abbeys, castles, manor houses, and churches. He frequently exhibited views of Haddon Hall, which had a special charm for him. His drawings were generally of rather small dimensions. The following works by him were hung in the Institute: in 1872, Capulet's Balcony, Verona, and Lichfield, Evening; Studio of Leonardo da Vinci at Fontainebleau, in 1873; Lichfield Cathedral from the Minster Pool, Porch of the Cathedral at Chartres, France, and Ludlow Castle in 1878.

Chase was the author of a work entitled A Practical Treatise on Landscape Painting and Sketching from Nature in Water-colours, edited by the Rev. James Harris, M.A., London, 1861.
