= The Six Servants =

European fairy tale

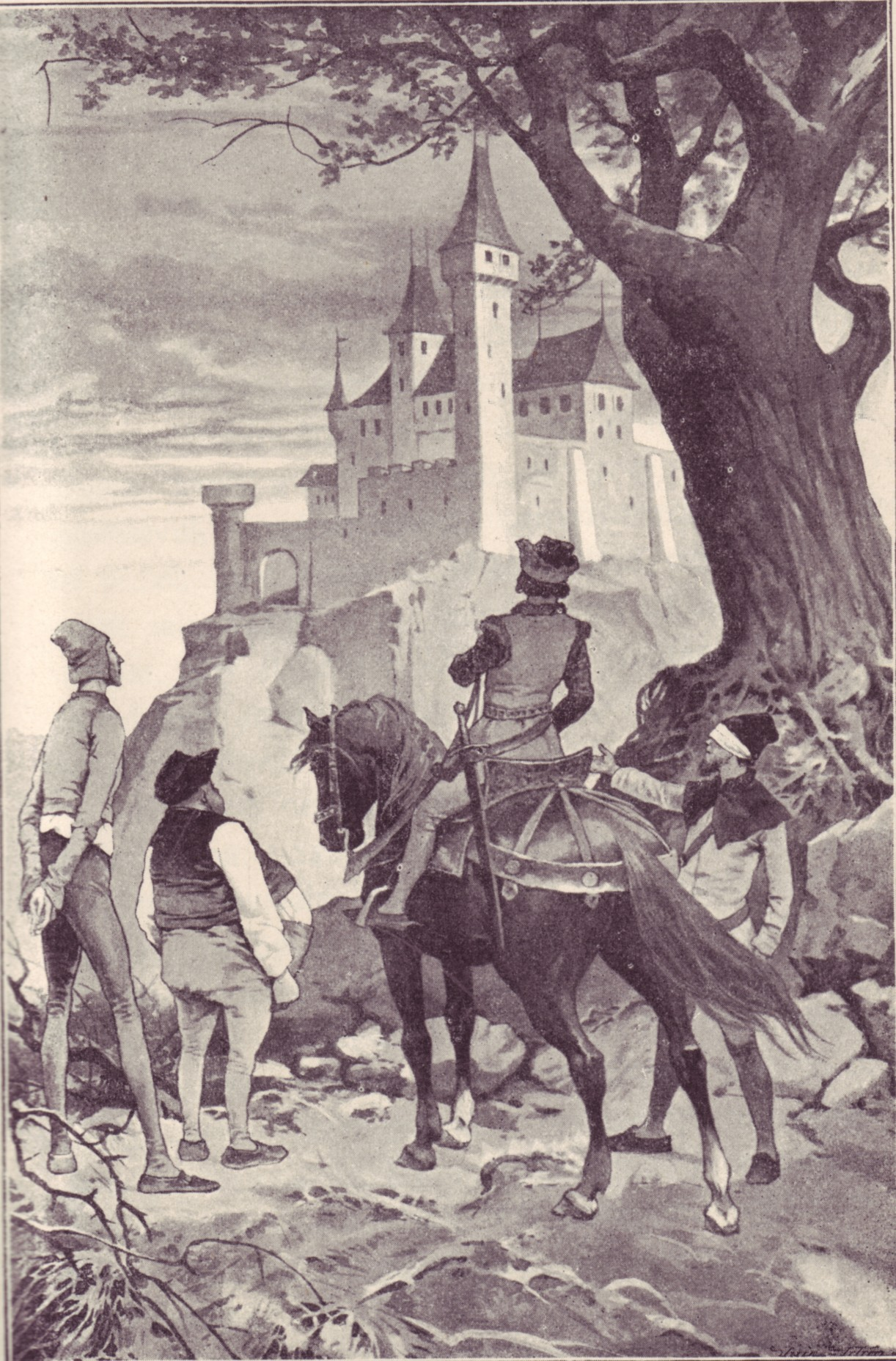
- The prince arriving at the castle.

Folk tale
- Name: The Six Servants
- Aarne–Thompson grouping: ATU 513A
- Country: Germany
- Published in: Grimm's Fairy Tales

"The Six Servants" (German: Die sechs Diener) is a German fairy tale collected by the Brothers Grimm and published in Grimm's Fairy Tales (KHM 134). It is of Aarne-Thompson type 513A ("Six Go through the Whole World").

== Synopsis ==
An evil Queen is a sorceress who has a beautiful princess daughter. She offers her hand in marriage, but all suitors have to fulfill impossible tasks. None of them ever managed to bring those to a good end, so she has all who failed beheaded.

One day, a prince hears about the princess and wants to compete to win her hand. At first his father forbids him to do so, but the son falls ill for seven years without a physician being able to help him. Only when the father allows him to go does his health improve. During his voyage the prince meets six men with amazing talents and powers, whom he all takes along to be his servants. The first one is a man with a belly as huge as a small mountain who is able to stretch himself out to even bigger obesity. The second is a man who is able to hear even the tiniest sound, demonstrated by the fact that when the prince meets him he is listening to the grass growing and can also hear someone being beheaded in the evil Queen's castle. The third servant is an incredibly tall man. The fourth one a man who wears a blindfold in front of his eyes because his glance is so powerful that it makes everything he sees split to pieces. The fifth servant is a man who feels cold in extreme heat and hot in extreme frost. The sixth and final servant is a man who can stretch his long neck to see over long distances.

The prince and his servants arrive at the Queen's castle. He is told to fulfill three tasks to gain her daughter's hand in marriage. First he has to fetch a ring which the Queen dropped in the Red Sea. The man with the sharp eyesight notices the ring, hanging on a pointy rock. The obese man drinks the sea dry, whereupon the tall man picks the ring up with ease. The Queen is surprised that they managed to safely perform the first task, but orders the second task next. The prince has to eat three hundred oxen, skin, hair, bones, horns and all, and drink three hundred casks of wine to the last drop. If any trace of these are found then he will lose his life. The prince asks whether he's allowed to have one guest join him and his wish is granted. Naturally he brings the obese servant along and in less than no time everything is finished.

For the final task the prince has to guard the princess in her room with his arms around her. If the Queen returns around the clock of midnight and the princess is no longer in his arms, then his life will be lost. The prince takes precautions by having the Tall servant and Obese servant surround him and the princess, so that nobody can touch them. However, the Queen casts a spell over them, which sets them off into a deep sleep. She then carries the princess away. At a quarter to twelve everybody awakes and the prince panics. The man with the amazing sense of hearing listens and hears her crying on a rock, three hundred leagues away. The Tall One rises, takes a few steps and runs towards them, taking the servant with the sharp eyesight with him. The latter looks at the rock, causing it to shatter into a thousand pieces, while the Tall One grabs the princess and brings her back before deadline.

With all three tasks fulfilled the Queen whispers in her daughter's ear that it's a shame that she has to obey common people and not being allowed to choose a husband to her own liking, which makes the princess angry. Next day she orders three hundred great bundles of wood to be lit on fire. If someone is able to sit in the midst of the wood and bear the fire then she'll truly marry him. The servant who can't stand cold fulfills the task, still shivering as the flames have burnt out.

Now the princess can not stop the prince from marrying her. As they drive off to church, the evil Queen sends her soldiers after them to stop them. The servant with the amazing sense of hearing hears her plan and tells the others. The obese servant spits out all the water he had drunk before, drowning all the soldiers. A next legion of soldiers is stopped by the servant with the amazing eyesight looking at them and shooting them to smithereens. After that, the marriage is held without any further problems and all the servants go their own separate ways.

Returning to his kingdom, the prince lies to his bride that he is actually a swineherd. He forces his bride to work in extreme poverty and misery for eight days, causing her to believe it is what she deserved for being so proud and haughty. Then she is brought to the palace, where the prince reveals it was all just a ploy to have her suffer just as much for him as he did for her. Then they marry as prince and princess and live happily ever after.

== In popular culture ==
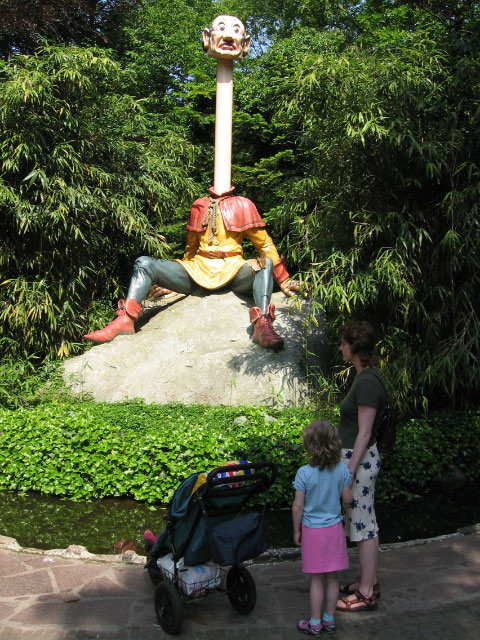
Langnek in the Fairy Tale Forest of the Dutch theme park Efteling

The fairy tale is well known in the Netherlands, thanks to it being part of several of the fairy tales exhibited in the theme park Efteling in Kaatsheuvel, North Brabant. A huge animatronic statue of the long-necked servant can be seen there since 1952, telling the story to all visitors on a repeated audio recording. This statue, called Langnek ("Longneck"), is also a mascot for the park. In 1955, a little pond was dug around the stone on which Long-neck sits. A bust of the servant with the sharp eyesight, Bullet-eye, with a wasp on his nose stood next to Long-neck. In the late 1950s, Bullet-eye was removed and a smaller bust of a blindfolded Bullet-eye was placed upon a kiosk near Long-neck. Long-neck received a new head in the 1970s; and in 1979, his body and neck were renewed. In 2006, safety-fences were placed near the pond. The tale is voiced by Peter Reijnders, and can be read from a book in Dutch, English, French and German.

== Comparisons ==
The story is very similar to other European folk tales and fairy tales about a man with very talented servants, such as How Six Made Their Way in the World, Long, Broad and Sharpsight, The Fool of the World and the Flying Ship, How the Hermit Helped to Win the King's Daughter, The Clever Little Tailor and one of the stories in Baron Munchhausen.
