= Caroline Southwood Hill =

English educationalist and writer

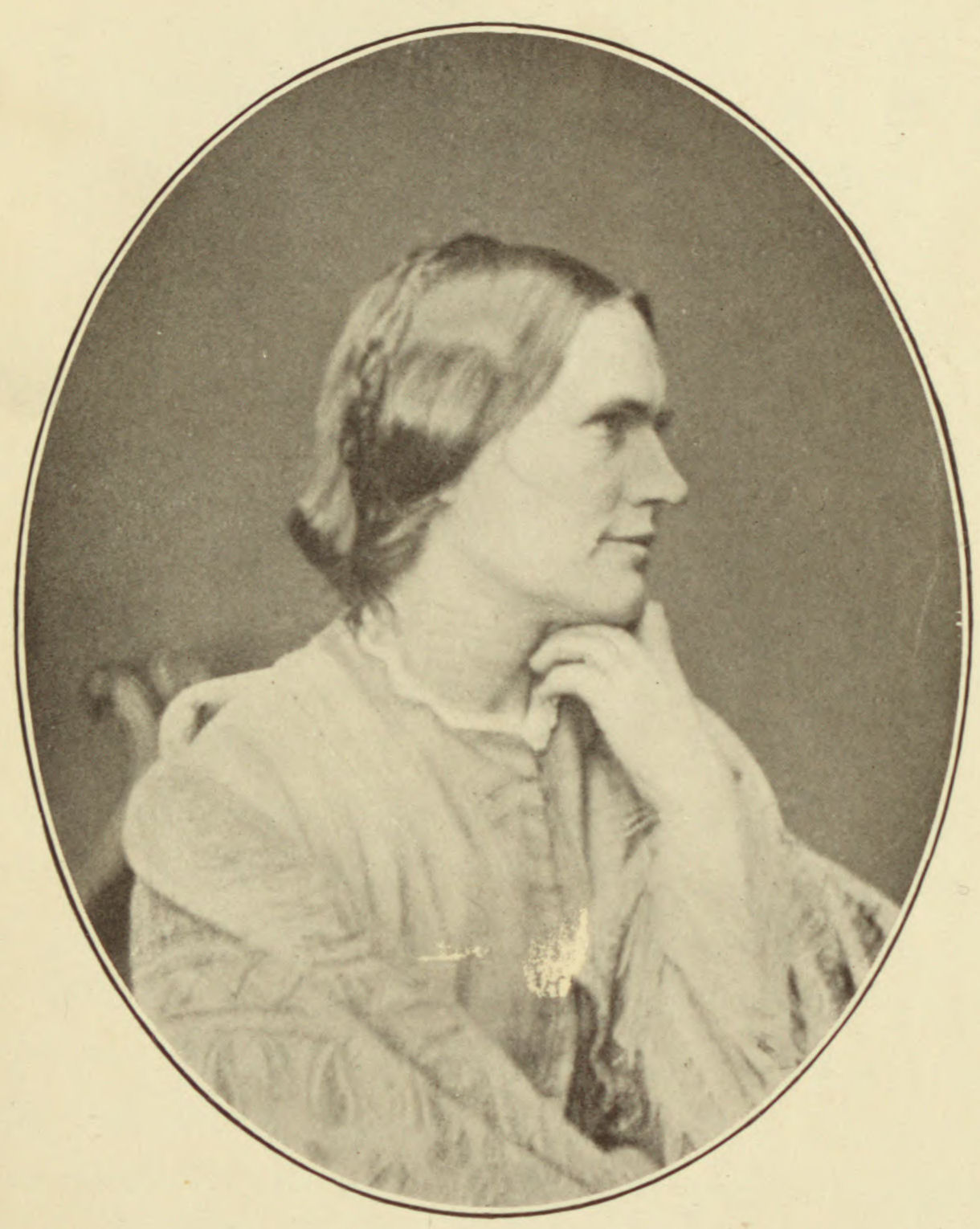
Caroline Southwood Hill

Caroline Southwood Hill (née Smith; 21 March 1809 – 31 December 1902) was an English educationalist and writer. In 1837 she established and ran a Pestalozzian infant school in Wisbech; the building now survives as part of the Angles Theatre. She was involved in many co-operative ventures, and moved in a radical circle of other reformers. She wrote three children's books and contributed works to a range of publications such as The Nineteenth Century and Charles Dickens's Household Words.

She was the daughter of Thomas Southwood Smith (1788–1861), a physician and sanitary reformer. In 1832 she became governess to the six surviving children of James Hill, and after the death of his second wife Eliza (1802-1832) they married on 21 July 1835. She was the mother of Gertrude (born 1837) who married Charles Lee Lewes, stepson of George Eliot, Octavia Hill (1838–1912) and Miranda Hill (1836–1910), both activists and social reformers; Emily (born 1840) who married the son of Christian Socialist F. D. Maurice; and Florence (born 1843).

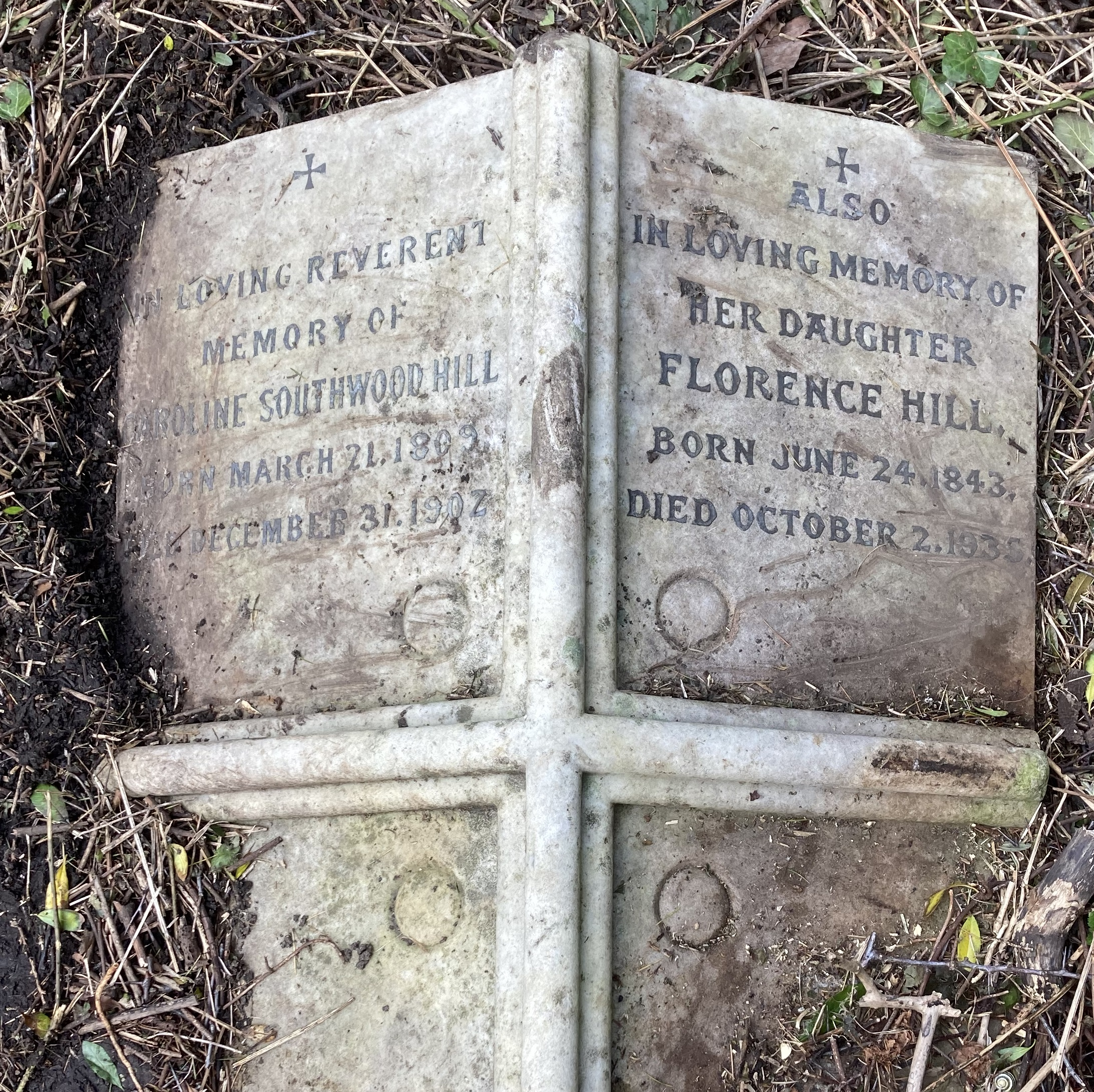
Grave of Caroline Southwood Hill in Highgate Cemetery

Caroline was buried in the dissenters section of the west side of Highgate Cemetery and rests with her daughter Florence who died in 1935. In the adjoining grave is Mary Gillies who is interred with an 1866 stillborn baby of Charles & Gertrude Lewes and also with Catherine, the widow of Richard Hengist Horne, who died in 1893.

The Octavia Hill Birthplace House on the South Brink, Wisbech operated by the Octavia Hill Society, contains many items belonging to the Hill family. There is a blue plaque to James and Caroline Hill on the former school building they built in 1837.

== Published works ==
- Southwood Hill, Caroline (1870). Wild-Flowers and their uses. London: Chambers.
- Southwood Hill, Caroline (1906). Notes on Education. London: Seeley and Co.
- Southwood Hill, Caroline (1907). Roundling and Other Fairy Tales. London: Seeley and Co.
