= Mary Grimstone =

British poet and novelist (1796–1869)

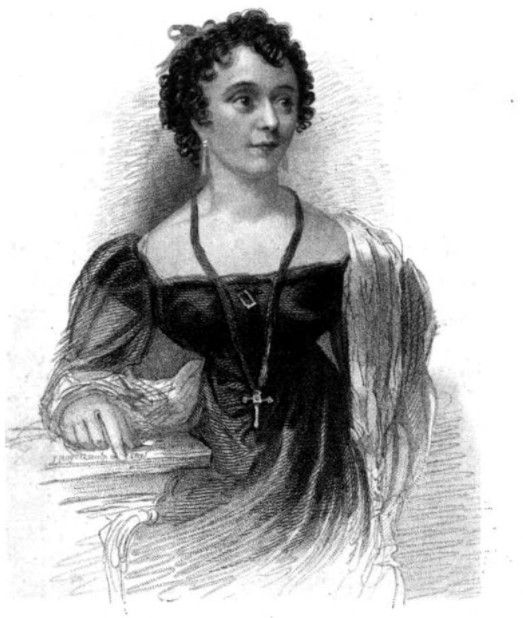
- Born: Mary Rede; 12 June 1796; Beccles, England
- Died: 4 November 1869 (aged 73); Paddington, England
- Occupation: Writer
- Spouses: Richard Grimstone; William Gillies

Mary Leman Grimstone (12 June 1796 – 4 November 1869) was a British poet and novelist. She wrote about women's rights and one of the first Australian novels, Louise Egerton.

== Life ==
Born in Beccles in Suffolk as Mary Rede, her father was Leman Thomas Rede. He was a barrister and writer, but was imprisoned for debt shortly before her birth. In 1798, the family moved to Hamburg in an attempt to escape creditors, where Mary's brother William Leman Rede was born. After Leman died in 1810, Mary's mother moved the family to London.

Mary began writing in 1815, with much of her early work published in La Belle Assemblée. The following year, she married Richard Grimstone. She came to wider attention in 1820, when a volume of her poems was published, under the pseudonym "Oscar", and with the title Zayda, a Spanish Tale. Another volume was published the following year as Cleone, while her first novel came out in 1825, The Beauty of the British Alps. That year, her husband died, and she moved to Hobart in Van Diemen's Land with her sister Lucy, and her brother-in-law.

Grimstone returned to London in 1829, her time in Australia providing much material for further work. Her first work under her own name was the novel Louisa Egerton, which came out in 1830. This novel is credited as the first "such work" that was an Australian novel. This was followed by Character, or, Jew and Gentile, Cleone, a Tale of Married Life and, most significantly, Woman's Love. In this last novel, she included a postscript in which she set out her view of women's rights, which had developed through her participation in a circle around the Unitarian South Place Chapel.

During the 1830s, Grimstone was active in Robert Owen's socialist movement, writing frequently for his New Moral World newspaper. In particular, she championed better education for women and for men and women to be held to the same moral standards. She also wrote, on similar themes, for the Unitarian journal, Monthly Repository, and for the Edinburgh Review. She was also active in the People's International League and a campaign for early education, led by Samuel Wilderspin.

In 1836, Grimstone married William Gillies, father of Margaret Gillies. One source says that she withdrew from writing until 1846. She had her writing published in the People's Journal. and its editor compared her work as equal to Jane Austen. In addition she enjoyed the social life of Mrs Gillies. Leigh Hunt included her in his poem 'Blue-Stocking Revels' in 1837 and she may have been the basis for "Lady Psyche" in Alfred, Lord Tennyson's The Princess. She was in the same social set as other writers including Elizabeth Gaskell and Caroline Norton.

She wrote about Australia and also about women's rights, but was less radical, mainly eulogising women's moral qualities. When the People's Journal closed in 1851, she stopped writing, and lived off an annuity until 1869, when she died in Paddington from swallowing disinfectant.
