= Miranda Hill =

English social reformer (1836–1910)

- Born: 1836; Wisbech, Isle of Ely, Cambridgeshire
- Died: 1910 (aged 73–74); Marylebone, London, England
- Occupations: Author, Humanitarian

Miranda Hill (Wisbech, Cambridgeshire 1836–1910) was an English social reformer.

== Biography ==
Hill was a daughter of James Hill (died 1872), a corn merchant, banker and follower of Robert Owen, and his third wife, Caroline Southwood Smith (1809–1902), a teacher and a daughter of Dr Thomas Southwood Smith, the pioneer of sanitary reform. The family were brought up in reduced financial circumstances, after their father went bankrupt in 1840 (for a second time), necessitating them to leave their home Bank House, South Brink, Wisbech. To earn her living, Miranda became a governess, and later became a teacher as did some of her sisters and half-sisters. Her half-brother Arthur, an engineer and coal merchant, was four times mayor of Reading.

== The Kyrle Society ==
Hill founded the influential Kyrle Society in 1875/1876, named after John Kyrle (1637–1724) for his creative philanthropy. The Society through its four committees provided art, music, books and open spaces to the working class poor, around the slogan "Bring Beauty Home to the Poor". This involved, at first, artistic decoration of hospitals, schools, literary institutes and working-class clubs. In 1876 her sister Octavia Hill became treasurer. There were numerous branches around the country, generally formed from around 1877 onwards, and one branch was supported by William Morris. The bryologist Frances Elizabeth Tripp was a donor to and supporter of the society. Another notable supporter was the Arts and Crafts architect Lady Mary Lovelace. The Society's Open Space Committee was influential in saving numerous stretches of heathland and woodland in London, that would otherwise have been built on, notably in 1890 the opening of Vauxhall Park. Many old burial grounds became public green spaces that are now highly prized leisure areas for Londoners. After 1885, a representative of the Society sat on the first Council of the National Trust.

There was also a horticultural wing aimed at children, and a branch called Invalid Children's Aid (ICA), which became independent in 1908. Membership of the Society often overlapped with that of the early women's suffrage movement.

Miranda also worked in Marylebone as a member of the Board of Guardians there.

She worked closely, from 1891, with her sister Octavia Hill on major housing reform projects in England.

== Published works ==
- Hill, Miranda; Kate Greenaway (1875). The Fairy Spinner and "Out of date or not?". London: Marcus Ward.
- Hill, Miranda (1903). Cinderella.
- Hill, Miranda (1903). Rumpelstiltzkin and Dummling, two plays.
- Hill, Miranda; Maggie Browne (1906). The "Plays for Little Folks": Containing Cinderella, Rumpelstiltzkin, and ... Cassell and Co.

== See also ==
- National Trust
- Aesthetic Movement
- William Morris
- John Ruskin
- Arts and Crafts Movement
