= James Charles Armytage =

English engraver

James Charles Armytage (c. 1802 – 28 April 1897) was an English engraver of the 19th century. He produced over 200 plates. He was described by John Ruskin in Modern Painters as "first rate" and Ruskin used Armytage for many of his books. He specialized in small books and by the end of his life he was considered the last to specialize in his profession.
