= The Clever Little Tailor =

German fairy tale

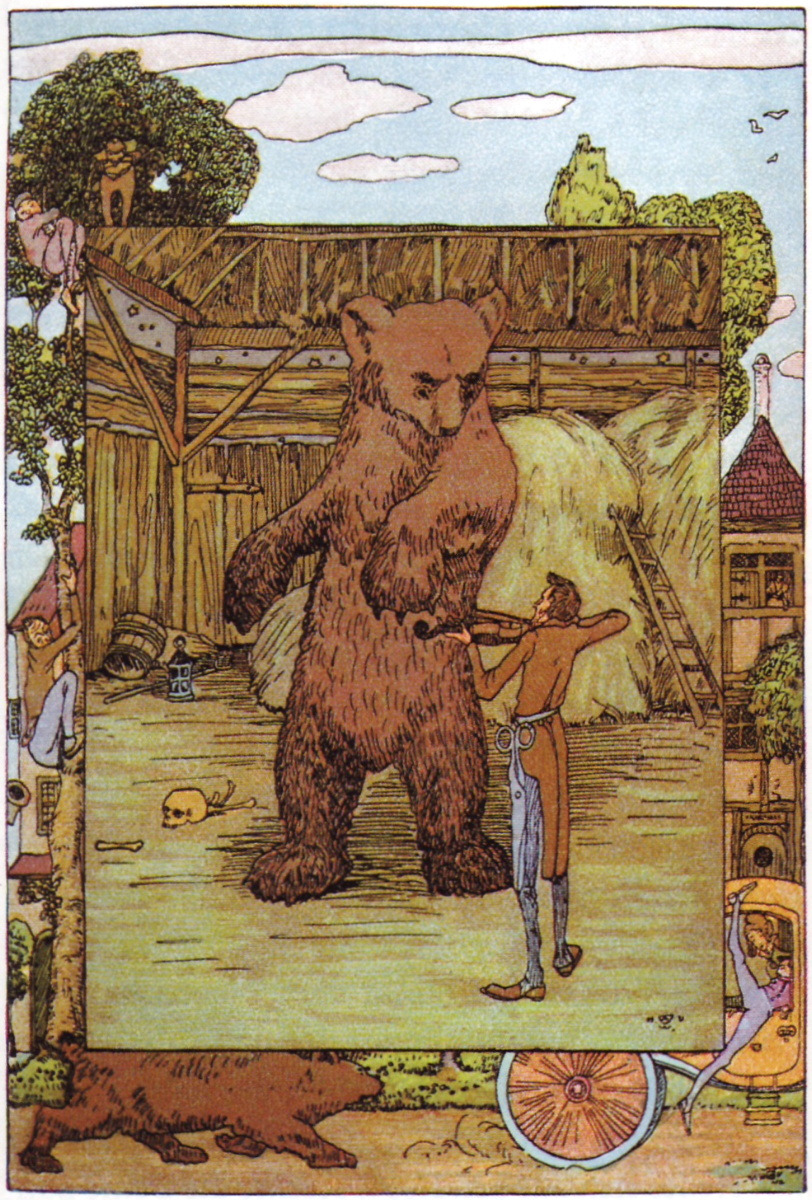
- Illustration by Heinrich Vogeler

Folk tale
- Name: The Clever Little Tailor
- Aarne–Thompson grouping: ATU 850
- Country: Germany
- Published in: Grimms' Fairy Tales

"The Clever Little Tailor" (German: Vom klugen Schneiderlein) is a German fairy tale collected by the Brothers Grimm as tale 114. It is Aarne-Thompson type 850, The Princess's Birthmarks. Andrew Lang included it in The Green Fairy Book.

== Synopsis ==
A proud princess set a riddle to her wooers and sent them away when they could not answer. Three tailors came. Two were known for their cleverness and skill, and the third for his uselessness. The princess asked them what two colors were her hairs. The first said black and white; the second brown and red; the third gold and silver, and he was right.

The princess demanded that he spend the night with a bear as well. In his stall, the tailor began to crack nuts. He offered the bear not nuts but pebbles, and the bear could not crack them. The tailor took one away, substituted a nut, and cracked it. The tailor began to fiddle, and the bear danced. The tailor offered to teach it, but first he had to cut its nails. He trapped it in a vise and left it there.

The princess agreed to marry him. The other two tailors freed the bear. It came after the carriage. The tailor stuck his legs out the window and threatened the bear with the claim that they were a vise. It ran off.

== Analysis ==
Professor Stith Thompson classified the tale type as Aarne–Thompson–Uther ATU 850, "The Birthmarks of the Princess".

Another characteristic element of the tale type is the type of the birthmark: they are usually shown as a sun, a moon, or a star. French historian François Delpech (fr) noted that strange birthmarks in folktales indicated a supernatural or royal origin of the characters, and mentioned the tale type in that regard. He interpreted the "hidden birthmark" as a sign of sovereignty, linked to the fate of the protagonist: to ascend to the throne.

== Variants ==
Stith Thompson suggested the tale type ATU 850 originated from genuine European oral folklore, since an ancient literary version is not attested. He also stated that variants are "told all over Europe". This geographical analysis seems to have been confirmed by scholars Richard Dorson and Kurt Ranke, who claimed that the tale type was "narrated throughout Europe as well as in North and South America".

=== Slavic-speaking area ===
August Leskien claimed that this "Märchenkreis" is very widespread in Slavic tradition, with the same plot: the princess sees the dancing animals (sheep, pigs, etc.) of a peasant who plays a musical instrument (flute, violin, etc.) and is interested in buying the animals, in exchange for showing her birthmarks.

=== Adaptations ===
Folktale scholar D. L. Ashliman developed his own reconstruction of a proto-form of the tale type.
