= Igor Krutogolov =

Israeli musical artist

Igor Krutogolov איגור קרוטוגולוב
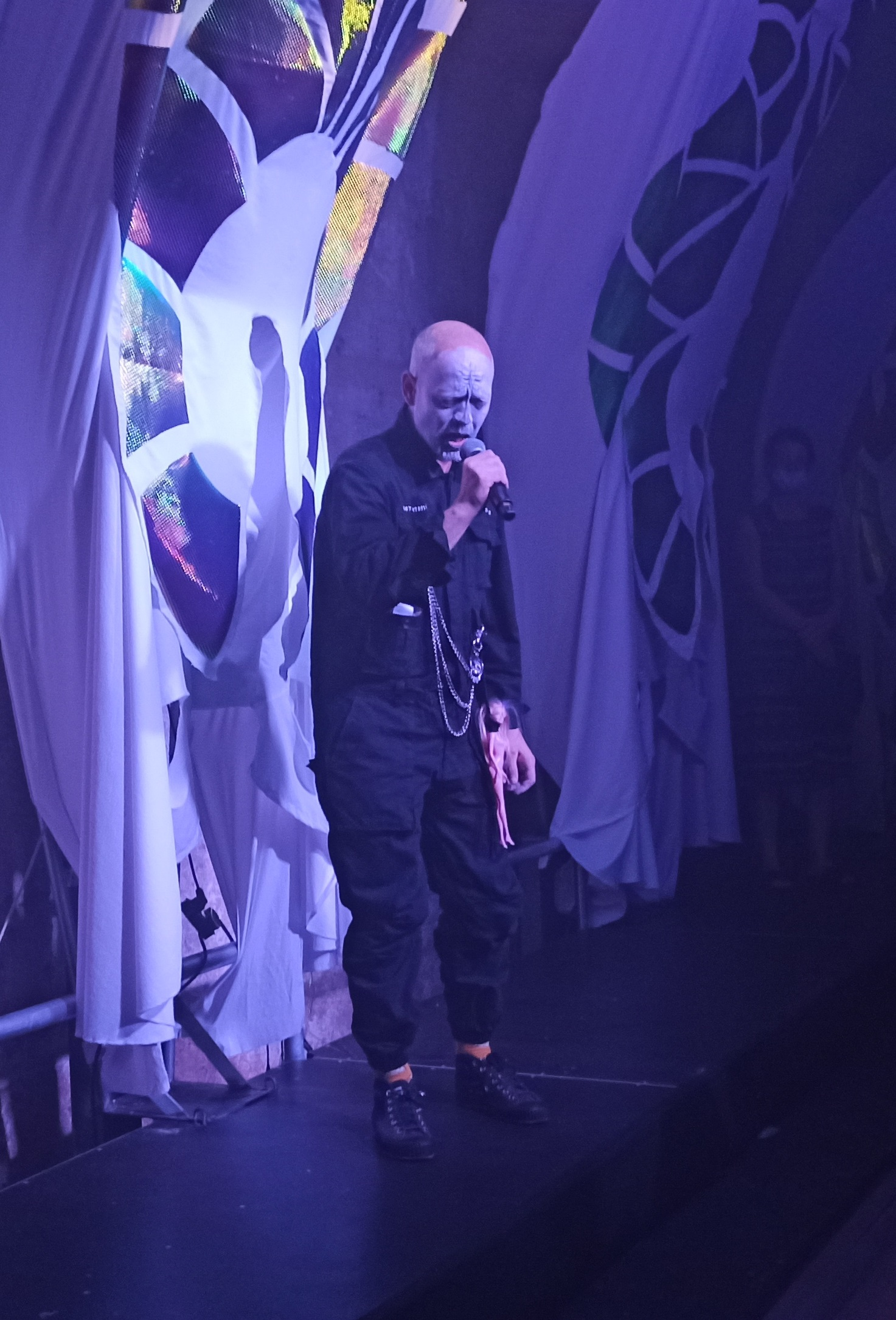
- Krutogolov in 2021 at the Acre Fringe Theatre Festival

Background information
- Born: 1976 (age 49–50); Tashkent, Uzbekistan, USSR
- Origin: Tel Aviv, Israel
- Genres: Avant-garde; experimental rock; electronic; industrial metal; doom metal; noise; drone; ambient; klezmer; free jazz; folk rock; alternative rock; hardcore punk
- Occupations: Musician; composer; bassist; songwriter; singer; musical producer; graphic designer
- Instruments: Bass guitar; saw; drum machine; drums; keyboards; cello; flute; horn; accordion; guitar; piano
- Years active: 1997–present
- Member of: KIP (Kruzenshtern & Parohod), Igor Krutogolov's Toy Orchestra

Igor Krutogolov (Hebrew: איגור קרוטוגולוב; born 1976, Tashkent, Uzbekistan) is an Israeli musician, composer, multi-instrumentalist, singer, songwriter, producer, graphic designer, artist, the founder and the leader of the bands Kruzenshtern & Parohod (KIP) and Igor Krutogolov's Toy Orchestra.

== Biography ==
Igor Krutogolov was born in 1976 in Tashkent, Uzbekistan. His love for music started at the age of 12, when he first listened to Shostakovich's Symphony No. 8. In 1989, he played drums in a local punk band in Tashkent. After he finished school in 1992, he immigrated with his parents to Israel.

== Music career ==
=== Early collaborations ===
Igor Krutogolov started his music career soon after he immigrated to Israel. Beginning in 1997, he took an active part in the Israeli indie music scene under the nickname Igor18 as a composer, bass player, vocalist and an album cover designer. Krutogolov collaborated with a number of Israeli musicians including Ruslan Gross, Vadim Gusis, Vera Agnivolok, Slava Smelovsky, and Anton Weiss. He played bass guitar, drums and experimented with unconventional musical instruments (saw, bow, children's toys etc.).

Together with his friend Ruslan Gross, a clarinetist and bassist with Rabies Caste, whom he met in 1995, Krutogolov joined the Israeli experimental project The Crossfishes, which united Israeli underground musicians and recorded live improvisational jazz and noise sessions. Krutogolov also joined the Israeli neofolk band Agnivolok as a bassist. He took part in recording the band's first album, Sculptor, released by the German label Stateart in 2001. The album was later reissued by the Israeli label Eastern Front in 2006. Krutogolov also appeared on Agnivolok's second album, Cherries, recorded in 2001 and released by Eastern Front in 2006. The album's first track, "The Golden Skull", premiered on the collection of Israeli post-industrial music Tel Aviv Aftermath (2002), a first release of the Israeli label Topheth Prophet. This collection includes other Krutogolov's early works: the track "Make Law" with New Jerusalem Defense Force, the track "Live 23.10.2001", a part of a live performance by The Crossfishes, and the outstanding solo track "About A Man Falling Apart". Krutogolov also appeared on electronic collection albums Intercontinental Zvukoprocessing (2004) (with his solo tracks "Hunt For Butterflies" and "-+") and Grannittin (2006) (with a solo track "Gurtuk"). In 2005, Krutogolov participated in The Crossfishes' live performance, recorded at the Vortex club in Tel Aviv and released on the collection album Noisemass 2005 in 2006 by Topheth Prophet. In 2006, Igor Krutogolov released the album Festivemood on the German label Apocalyptic Radio, recorded at the live performance with Ruslan Gross and Anton Weiss in Tel Aviv.

Igor Krutogolov closely collaborated with Israeli musician Vadim Gusis (Chaos As Shelter) on a number of electronic projects. In 2002, Krutogolov and Gusis released the album Locust Wind on the Italian label Pre Feed. In 2003, they worked with American musician David Brownstead (Tidal) on the album Ingathering of Exile, released by the American label Ground Fault Recordings. In July 2003, Krutogolov and Gusis collaborated with Eric Wood (Bastard Noise) and recorded the album The Geometry of Soul, released by Topheth Prophet. Krutogolov and Gusis also appeared together on electronic collections Infernal Proteus (2002) and Tonal Destruction [II] (2003), both released on American labels.

In 2005, Krutogolov and Gusis joined the collaboration project of the Israeli avant-garde band Grundik+Slava, with Israeli singer Victoria Hanna, for the album Frogs, a joint release by Topheth Prophet and Auris Media Records. Hanna's improvised recordings were combined with synthesized ambient electronics, noise improvisations, drone organics and tribal ethnic rhythms. Krutogolov also took part in a recorded jazz concert Live at Levontin 07.04.2008 (2009) with Grundik Kasyansky and Slava Smelovsky (Grundik+Slava).

In 2009, Krutogolov joined Vadim Gusis's new electronic project, Thunderwheel, and recorded two albums: Credo (2009) and Lumberjack Blues (2010). The latter was also released on LP. Credo received many positive reviews in a number of musical magazines in different languages (Judas Kiss, Gothtronic, Musique Machine, Darkroom Magazine and others). The special feature of the album is the use of unconventional musical instruments such as analogue synthesizer, termenvox and the saw played by Igor and giving a special sounding to the album. Krutogolov also played the bass, guitar, percussions and sang on the albums.

=== Further collaborations ===
Igor Krutogolov played at numerous avant-rock and jazz festivals and venues in collaboration with Japanese and Israeli jazz musicians: Kazuyuki Kishino (KK Null), Kazutoki Umezu, Tatsuya Yoshida, Assif Tsahar, Haggai Fershtman (Monotonix), Daniel Sarid, Ariel Armoni, and Ariel Shiboleth. Some of the live improvisation shows were recorded and released as albums: Live in The Head (2008), with Japanese drummer Tatsuya Yoshida and Israeli saxophonist Assif Tsahar, Hot Exhaust (2010) and Cold Exhaust (2020), with Assif Tsahar and the Israeli drummer Haggai Fershtman, Live at Levontin 7 (2012), with the Israeli pianist Daniel Sarid and the Israeli drummer Ariel Armoni; and Quit Silence (2020) with the Israeli saxophonist Ariel Shibolet.

Krutogolov recorded several albums with the Japanese writer and experimentalist Kenji Siratori: Chaos Cell, Ancient Device (2009), Archaic Sky (2009), and WHNZ:15:KATER/Dark Water (2010). The albums are the stories narrated by Kenji Siratori to Krutogolov's electronic dark-ambient music (organ, acoustic guitar, strings, percussion, sound effects).

In 2013, Krutogolov collaborated with Israeli klezmer-punk-rock band Habiluim on the album Hora Haslama! (on saw and horn).

In 2018, Krutogolov recorded an experimental 12-minute cover of the song "Vesyoliy razgovor" ("Cheerful Talk") with Israeli singer Svetlana Ben for the tribute album Vesyoliy razgovor (Cheerful Talk) (2018), dedicated to the Russian poet Alexander Galich.

Igor Krutogolov closely collaborated with the Russian performative narrator and musician Psoy Korolenko in a number of projects. He joined the project Psoy & Oy Division, on saw, together with Noam Enbar's band Oy Division and took part in the recording and presentation of the album Dicunt (2013) presented on August 22, 2013, in Moscow. Krutogolov also joined the project Psoy & The Israelifts, on saw and bass, to record the albums Goy Hands (2017) and Equine Canine Soldier Whore (2017). The latter was presented on April 29, 2017, in Tel Aviv at the concert dedicated to Psoy Korolenko's 50th birthday. At the same concert, Krutogolov and Psoy presented their joint project's album HHHH No. 2 ПППП (2015) in a new experimental genre "ПППП" ("Song & Poetry Semi-Performance" from Russian "Песенно-Поэтический Полу-Перформанс"). Krutogolov also collaborated with Psoy Korolenko, Oy Division and the German klezmer band Daniel Kahn & the Painted Bird on the album The Unternationale: The Fourth Unternational (2020).

=== Solo albums ===
Krutogolov has released three solo albums: the experimental noise Muzika Elektronika (2005) issued four times on different labels (Esc.rec., Netherlands, T'an!Kaven!!Ash!!!, Israel, Operator Produkzion, Russia, Heart Shaped Box Prod., Russia), the neo-classical ambient White (2006), and the electronic 1970s Uzbek Electronic Music (2019) released on tape.

=== Kruzenshtern and Parohod ===
In 2002, Igor Krutogolov founded the band Kruzenshtern & Parohod (Russian: Крузенштерн и пароход): Igor Krutogolov (bass guitar, vocals), Ruslan Gross (clarinet) and Guy Shechter (drums). The band's debut album The Craft of Primitive Klezmer was released in July 2003 by the Israeli label Auris Media Records and was followed by a number of live performances due to the album's great success in Israel and abroad. The album was compared to the best recordings of the Radical Jewish Culture series released by John Zorn's record label Tzadik.

In November 2004, Auris Media released the band's bootleg Live in Karaganda, a live experimental jazz performance at the Barby club in Tel Aviv on November 30, 2004. The record had a unique cover designed by Igor Krutogolov for each of its 27 copies that were immediately sold out after the show. In the same month, the band released its second album Songs. All of the songs for the album were composed by Krutogolov (except for the cover of John Zorn's "Meholalot"). The style of the album was described as experimental jazz and folk. The album was mixed and mastered by the Ahvak soundman Udi Koomran.

In 2005, the band Kruzenshtern & Parohod recorded a live session in the Noize rehearsal studio in Tel Aviv. The record was released in 2012 as the album Noize 2005.

In October 2006, the band released a split with the French duet Vialka. Olya Yelensky on accordion joined the band as a fourth member. A joint live performance and a presentation of the split album took place in November 2006 at the Levontin 7 club in Tel Aviv.

In February 2008, the band recorded a live improvisational performance with the Ukrainian band I Drug Moy Gruzovik and released the album Melekh (2008) under the joint name Gruzovik i Kruzenshtern.

In 2008, Krutogolov created an opera on behalf of the imaginary composer Zelig Rabichnyak and recorded the album Love for Three Cockroaches in collaboration with the Polish band Mitch & Mitch. The record also featured Ruslan Gross (Kruzenshtern & Parohod) and the accordionist Boris Marzinovsky (Charming Hostess, Panic Ensemble). The album premiered in December 2009 at the OFF Festival in Katowice, Poland. The album was released in 2010 and received enthusiastic reviews. The album booklet included a detailed description of Zelig Rabichnyak's life and career, a special addition created by Igor Krutogolov.

In 2008, the band Kruzenshtern & Parohod was joined by the accordionist Boris Marzinovsky. The band changes its style leaving behind the Jewish and Klezmer motives. The music becomes more complex revealing the many sides of Krutogolov's talent as a composer. In December 2008, the band recorded an album, released as The Hidden Album in 2012. At the same period, the band recorded an experimental hardcore-jazz-klezmer album with the American musician Eugene Robinson (Oxbow) released in 2015 as Hidden Album Volume II on LP.

=== KIV Orchestra ===
In 2012, the band Kruzenshtern & Parohod united with Marlise Freshville and Eric Borosh from Vialka duet to form a collaboration project KIV Orchestra. The band launched a European tour (France, Belgium, Germany, Poland, Czechia, Switzerland) and recorded three consecutive albums: La Roue (2012), Extension (2013) and Whole (2013). As part of the European tour, the band members participated in the recording of a short film about the 22nd Jewish Culture Festival in Kraków created by the Israeli musician Ophir Kutiel (Kutiman) for his "Thru The City" project.

=== KIP ===
In November 2015, Kruzenshtern & Parohod recorded a new album HYMNS at the DTH Studios in Moscow, Russia. On the next day, the band presented the album at the DOM Culture Center in Moscow. The music on the album differs greatly from the previous band's works, so the band's name was changed to the abbreviated name KIP. The album was mixed and mastered by James Plotkin. The band is back to its initial three-member line-up: Krutogolov, Gross and Shechter.

In 2020, KIP released the album Songs of Love. The album's track "#2" premiered on the metal collection album Milim Kashot. Vol. 2 (2020). The album had very enthusiastic reviews and was rated one of the most successful metal albums of the year 2020 by the Machine Music magazine.

=== Fedorov and Kruzenshtern ===
In 2013, the band Kruzenshtern & Parohod recorded the album Byt vezde (Everywhere) with Leonid Fedorov, the leader of the Russian band Auktyon to the verses of the Russian poet Dmitry Ozersky. The album was presented on September 6, 2013, at the Gogol club in Moscow and on September 8 at the A2 club in Saint Petersburg. The show at the A2 club in Saint Petersburg was released on DVD in 2014. The album was released under the joint name Fedorov & Kruzenshtern. This collaboration marked the beginning of a long-term and fruitful partnership between Igor Krutogolov and Leonid Fedorov.

- In 2015, Krutogolov and Fedorov recorded the album Vzryv tsvetov (Blast of Bloom) to the verses of the Russian poet Dmitry Avaliani and Dmitry Ozersky. The album was recorded in several stages as a result of live improvisational performances. The music was written by both Krutogolov and Fedorov. The album was presented in Tel Aviv, Moscow and Saint Petersburg in 2015. In the same year, the duet releases a mini-album V trave (In the Grass) consisting of two songs, "V trave" ("In the Grass") and "Vzryv tsvetov" ("Blast of Bloom") recorded differently from those on the album Vzryv tsvetov (Blast of Bloom).
- In 2016, Krutogolov took part in the presentation of Leonid Fedorov's album Psalmy (Psalms). The album consists of songs to the verses of six Old Testament psalms translated into Russian by Anri Volokhonsky.

Starting from 2018, the duet of Krutogolov and Fedorov (as Fedorov & Kruzenshtern) recorded several consecutive albums:

- Postoyanstvo veseliya i gryazi (The Constancy of Mirth and Dirt) (2018), to the verses of the Russian avant-garde poet Daniil Kharms. The idea of the album belonged to Igor Krutogolov who wrote four songs for the album on his own and four songs with Fedorov. Lidia Fedorova also participated in the collaboration as a vocalist and composer. The album features Krutogolov's vocals. The album was presented on April 6, 2018, in the Central House of Artists in Moscow and on April 8 at the Erarta club in Saint Petersburg. The day before the premiere, Saint Petersburg citizens were presented 14 sacks (the number of tracks on the album) containing the signed CDs. The sacks were scattered around the city in the places related to Daniil Kharms's biography. The video clip to the song "Gvidon" was released in 2018.
- Gimn chume (The Hymn to the Plague) (2019), to the verses of the Russian poet Alexander Pushkin, mostly unpublished ones. The album also features the Russian composer Vladimir Martynov (piano), Ruslan Gross (KIP, clarinet) and Lidia Fedorova (vocals). Three video clips were released in 2019: "Gimn chume" ("The Hymn to the Plague"), "Talisman" ("Mascot") and "Tsvetok" ("Flower").
- Iz neba i vody (Out of Sky and Water) (2019), to the verses of Dmitry Ozersky. Krutogolov and Fedorov tried to make each song different from one another, both compositionally and when recorded. The music for the album was composed in an improvisational manner, at the first take, which became a tradition for the duet. The album was presented on December 19, 2019, at the Morze club in Saint Petersburg and on December 21 at the Sixteen Tons club in Moscow.
- Blake (2020), to the verses of William Blake translated into Russian by Alexander Delfinov and Andrey Smurov. The album consists of 18 tracks each illustrated with a video-clip created during the COVID-19 quarantine. The music was composed by both Igor Krutogolov and Leonid Fedorov. Several songs feature Igor's vocals. Krutogolov also appears in the video clips, "Bolnaya roza" ("The Sick Rose"), "Ulybka" ("The Smile"), and "Detskiy vostorg" ("Infant Joy").
- Asherah (2023), to the 10-verse poem Pesni srublenoy Ashery (The Songs of the Felled Asherah) by the Israeli poet and culturologist Michael Korol. Krutogolov and Fedorov composed and recorded the album together in their traditional manner giving each song a unique sound and style. Each song is devoted to a certain god from the Ugaritic mythology. The album became a soundtrack for the ballet-film Asherah by Anna Ozerskaya. (for more information, see below: Film and theatre work)

=== Toy Orchestra ===
==== Igor Krutogolov's Karate Band ====
In 2005, Igor Krutogolov gathered a group of fellow musicians and friends to form a toy orchestra named Igor Krutogolov's Karate Band. The idea of the project was to use only toy musical instruments and toys to produce music. The band consisted of 11 members: Igor Krutogolov (composer, toy guitar, toy clarinet, voice), Ruslan Gross (toy guitar), Guy Schechter (toy drums), Olya Yelensky (toy keyboard), Ido Azaria (toy clarinet), Victor Levin (toy clarinet), Leonid Ulitsky (toy saxophone), Gregory Bado (toy trumpet), Tanya Bogoslavsky (toy xylophone), Einav Cohen (rubber toys), and Shelly Dublinsky (rubber toys). The band's first performance took place on April 7, 2005, at the Green Racoon club in Tel Aviv following the literary evening of the Russian postmodern writer Vladimir Sorokin.

The band's first album Children 4 Muzik was released in October 2005. The band plays a mixture of styles described as "experimental noise comedy". The album was presented in November 2005 at the avant-garde music festival at the Zappa club in Tel Aviv.

In 2006, the band recorded a 56-minute cover of "Consume Red" by the Japanese musician Otomo Yoshihide and released it as a digital album Plays Ground Zero: Consume Red in 2021 during the COVID-19 pandemic.

The album How to Be a Crocodile was released in 2014 and was presented at the Levontin 7 club in Tel Aviv on February 27, 2014. The band recorded original songs to the gibberish lyrics written by Igor Krutogolov under the nickname Mursulik. The album also includes the song to the poem by Daniil Kharms "Zhuravli i Korabli" ("The Cranes and the Ships"). The album featured a new line-up: Igor Krutogolov (toy guitar, vocals, toy accordion, toy noise), Guy Shechter (toy drums), Victor Levin (toy clarinet), Mihai Cernea (toy clarinet), Naomi Rosin (toy clarinet), Dror Pikielny (toy clarinet), Neil Kalman (toy clarinet, toy trumpet), Slava Frenklakh (toy keyboards, toy piano), Niv Majar (toy glockenspiel, toy xylophone, pigs), and Inbar Livne Bar-On (vocals). All the music on the album was composed by Igor Krutogolov.

==== Igor Krutogolov's Toy Orchestra ====
In 2017, Igor Krutogolov's Karate Band was joined by a vocalist Yam Umi, the singer with the Israeli electric hardcore band Killing Machine. Thanks to Umi's voice, the band acquired new sound and the band's name was changed to Igor Krutogolov's Toy Orchestra. In 2017, the band released a new album Roots Over Roots consisting of two covers ("Roots Over Roots" by Sepultura and "Over" by Portishead). The band was also joined by the Israeli-British singer Yifeat Ziv (The Hazelnuts/האחיות לוז). The new line-up gave a concert in December 2018 at the Levontin 7 club in Tel Aviv.

In 2019, Israeli drummer Roy Chen (Megason, Malox) joined the band. The group performed live as part of the cultural and educational project "Eshkolot", supported by the Embassy of Israel in Russia. The band performed new covers, "Little God in My Hands" (by Swans) and "Guerrilla Radio" (by Rage Against the Machine) as well as other band's songs, including "Zhuravli i korabli" ("The Cranes and the Ships") performed by the Russian singer Anna Khvostenko. The concert program also included a masterclass for kids and the kids’ participation in the live performance with the band.

In 2022, the band released the album Live at Musrara Mix recorded at the Musrara Mix Festival 2020 in Jerusalem and issued two singles, "Bebe La Sangre" (2022) and "Sucky" (2022).

The band also takes part in film and theater productions: in Or Marin's multi-genre show TOYZZZ (2021) and in the filming and presentation of Roee Rosen’s musical film Kafka for Kids (2022). (for details, see below: Film and theatre work)

== Film and theatre work ==
=== Music for cinema and theatre shows ===
In 2003, Igor Krutogolov composed music for the animation film Wardrobe by Japanese directors Yamamoto Hiromi and Takayuki Iwasawa. Krutogolov also created a doll for the film. The soundtrack to the film was released as the album Wardrobe in September 2004. The album also features Vadim Gusis, Valery Prokov and Kondo Yoshiaki.

Igor Krutogolov has written music for a number of theatrical shows by Israeli directors and choreographers:

- Migova Deshe (From the Grass Height) (2006), a multidisciplinary project directed and choreographed by Irad Matsliakh (co-composer: Roy Yarkoni),
- Meever Leyam (Overseas) (2008), to the verses by Hayim Bialik directed by Alina Ashbal,
- Max and Moritz (2009), a performative narration of Wilhelm Busch's story Max and Moritz by the Israeli performer Zeev Tene directed by Ishay Karni,
- Halokh Vashuv (Back and Forth) (2013), an adaptation of Hanna Yablonska's play The Boatman directed by Sasha Kreindlin,
- Borot (Holes) (2014), a show directed by Ariel Bronz and choreographed by Marina Baltov,
- Proiekt De La Shmate: Hanitsnuts (De La Shmate Project: The Sparkle) (2017), a puppet show directed by Sharon Silver Marat and performed by the Israeli puppet artists Anna Grinband and Igor Tsinovoy.

=== Collaboration with Roee Rosen ===
Starting from 2010, Igor Krutogolov closely collaborated with the Israeli-American director, writer and artist Roee Rosen. Krutogolov first appeared in Roee Rosen's short film Out (2010) as an actor performing a song to Sergei Yesenin's poem ‘’Pismo materi’’ (‘’A Letter to Mother’’) and playing the saw accompanied by Boris Marzinovsky on accordion. Out premiered at the 67th Venice International Film Festival in 2010 and won the Orizzonti award for best short film. The film was also officially nominated for the European Academy Award for best short film.

In Roee Rosen's series The Buried Alive Videos (2013), Krutogolov appeared both as an actor and the author of the music in two episodes: "Animation Chants for Commodities: Little Iron" (2008) and "Animation Chants for Commodities: A Hybrid" (2009). The film premiered at the 2013 International Rome Film Festival, where it was awarded a special mention in the CinemaXXI program. The film also won the best film award at the Bucharest International Experimental Film Festival in 2014.

Igor Krutogolov also composed music for the opera to Roee Rosen's book Vladimir's Night (2014). The opera excerpts were presented to the audience preceding the screening of The Buried Alive Videos as part of the 3d Berlin Documentary Forum at the House of World Cultures in Berlin on June 1, 2014 and before the screening of The Buried Alive Videos at the Pompidou Centre in Paris on June 29, 2018. The opera excerpts were presented in a live performance by the Israeli opera singer Inbar Livne Bar-On and the Israeli pianist Udi Bonen.

In 2016, Igor Krutogolov composed music for Roee Rosen's surrealist operetta-film The Dust Channel. The film premiered at the 2016 Marseille International Film Festival and was presented at the international festivals in Vienna, Austria (Viennale 2017), Madrid, Spain (FILMADRID 2017), Seul, South Korea (Jeonju 2017), and Sydney, Australia (2018).

In 2018, Igor Krutogolov collaborated with Roee Rosen on the film Kafka for Kids. Krutogolov suggested using his toy orchestra for the film, which significantly changed the direction of the film's sound and image. The band's musicians performed on set as part of the film's cast, with Yam Umi and Yifeat Ziv also playing additional parts. The film sketches including three songs performed live by Igor Krutogolov's Toy Orchestra, with Yifeat Ziv as a lead singer, were presented at the Steirischer Herbst Art Festival on September 22, 2018, at the Graz Orpheum theatre in Graz, Austria. The film Kafka for Kids premiered at the 2022 International Film Festival in Rotterdam, Netherlands (IFFR 2022) and was shown at the international film festivals in Marseille, France (FIDMarseille 2022), Curitiba, Brazil (Olhar de Cinema 2022), Lisbon, Portugal (Doclisboa 2022), Vienna, Austria (Viennale 2022) and Copenhagen, Denmark (CPH:DOX 2023). At the FIDMarseille festival, the film was awarded the Camargo Foundation award and the festival's highest prize, Air France Panavision. The film's soundtrack was released on LP in 2022.

=== Collaboration with Or Marin ===
In 2021, Igor Krutogolov and his toy orchestra joined a multi-genre theatrical project TOYZZZ in collaboration with the Israeli dance theatre group led by Or Marin and Oran Nahum. The initial intention was to incorporate the band's current songs into the performance, but eventually Krutogolov composed five more songs and co-authored the project. The band's musicians performed and interacted with nine theatre-group dancers in what was described as "a combination of a party, a circus, an orgy and a closed ward". The musical show TOYZZZ premiered at the 2021 Acre Fringe Theatre Festival in Israel and was presented at the festival 11 times. The show won several awards: best show, best design (space, costumes, light and music), best dance and a special prize for musical achievements (to Igor Krutogolov, Yam Umi and Igor Krutogolov's Toy Orchestra). The show was presented to a wider audience in December 2021 in Tel Aviv at the Tmuna theatre where it was shown seven times.

In 2023, Igor Krutogolov composed music for Or Marin's dancing show Loud and Clear. The show premiered on August 15, 2023, at the Derida Dance Center in Sofia, Bulgaria.

=== Co-composer with Leonid Fedorov ===
In 2016, Krutogolov collaborated with Leonid Fedorov to compose music for theatrical performances of a multidisciplinary art & cinema project DAU by the Russian director Ilya Khrzhanovsky. The project premiered between January 25 and February 17, 2019, in Paris. The performances and installations played out in three neighboring venues: the Théâtre du Châtelet, the Théâtre de la Ville and the Centre Pompidou. Krutogolov and Fedorov composed 30 songs for the project. The song "Nebo" ("The Sky") was performed at Fedorov & Krutogolov live shows and was included in Leonid Fedorov's solo album Posledny drug (The Last Friend) (2021).

In 2021, Krutogolov collaborated with Leonid Fedorov on a multidisciplinary project Asherah to compose music to the 10-verse poem Pesni srublenoy Ashery (The Songs of the Felled Asherah) by the Israeli poet and culturologist Michael Korol. Each song is devoted to a certain god from the Ugaritic mythology. Initially, the music was written for a ballet show to be performed live, but due to COVID-19 restrictions, the ballet was eventually shot as a film directed by a choreographer Anna Ozerskaya. The film-ballet Asherah premiered on August 9, 2023, at the Oktyabr cinema in Moscow and was followed by a public talk with the project participants.

== Discography ==
=== Soundtracks to theatrical shows and films ===
- 2004 – Wardrobe (animation film by Yamamoto Hiromi and Takayuki Iwasawa), CD
- 2006 – מגובה דשא (From The Grass Height) (show by Irad Matsliakh)
- 2008 – מעבר לים (Overseas) (show by Alina Ashbal)
- 2009 – מקס ומוריץ (Max and Moritz) (show by Ishay Karni)
- 2010 – Out/Tse (film by Roee Rosen)
- 2013 – הלוך ושוב (Back and Forth) (show by Sasha Kreindlin)
- 2013 – The Buried Alive Videos (film by Roee Rosen)
- 2014 – בורות (Holes) (show by Ariel Bronz and Marina Baltov)
- 2014 – Vladimir's Night (book-opera by Roee Rosen)
- 2016 – The Dust Channel (film-operetta by Roee Rosen)
- 2017 – פרויקט דה לה שמעטה: הנצנוץ (De La Shmate Project: The Sparkle) (puppet show by Sharon Silver Marat)
- 2019 – Men are wild beasts, you are not like them (animation film by Yehonatan Levitas)
- 2019 – DAU (film by Ilya Khrzhanovsky)
- 2021 – TOYZZZ (show by Or Marin)
- 2022 – Kafka for Kids (film by Roee Rosen), LP
- 2023 – Loud and Clear (show by Or Marin)
- 2023 – Ашера (Asherah) (film-ballet by Anna Ozerskaya), CD

=== Solo albums ===
- 2005 – Muzika Elektronika, CD
- 2006 – White, CD
- 2019 – 1970s Uzbek Electronic Music, tape

=== Kruzenshtern and Parohod (KIP) ===
- 2003 – The Craft of the Primitive Klezmer, CD
- 2004 – Songs, CD
- 2004 – Live In Karaganda, CD
- 2006 – Kruzenshtern & Parohod / Vialka, split CD, split LP (2012)
- 2008 – Melekh (feat. IDMG), CD
- 2010 – Love for Three Cockroaches (feat. Mitch & Mitch), CD
- 2011 – Noize 2005, CD
- 2012 – Hidden Album, CD
- 2012 – La Roue (as KIV Orchestra), CD
- 2013 – Extension (as KIV Orchestra), CD
- 2013 – Whole (as KIV Orchestra), LP
- 2015 – Hidden Album Volume II (feat. Eugene S. Robinson), LP
- 2016 – Hymns (as KIP), CD
- 2020 – Songs of Love (as KIP)

=== Igor Krutogolov's Toy Orchestra (Igor Krutogolov's Karate Band) ===
- 2005 – Children 4 Music, CD
- 2014 – How to Be a Crocodile, CD
- 2017 – Roots Over Roots, 7"
- 2021 – Plays Ground Zero: Consume Red
- 2022 – Live At Musrara Mix, CD
- 2022 – Bebe La Sangre (single)
- 2022 – Sucky (single)

=== In collaboration with Leonid Fedorov (Fedorov & Kruzenshtern, Fedorov & Krutogolov) ===
- 2013 – Быть везде (Everywhere), CD, LP
- 2015 – Взрыв цветов (Blast of Bloom), CD
- 2015 – В траве (In the Grass), LP
- 2018 – Постоянство веселья и грязи (The Constancy of Mirth and Dirt), CD
- 2019 – Гимн чуме (The Hymn to the Plague), CD
- 2019 – Из неба и воды (Out of Sky and Water), CD, LP
- 2020 – Блэйк (Blake), CD
- 2023 – Ашера (Asherah), CD
- 2024 – Леопард (Leopard), CD

=== Other collaborations ===
- 2002 – Sculptor (with Agnivolok), LP, CD (2006)
- 2002 – Locust Wind (with Chaos as Shelter), CD
- 2003 – Geometry of Soul (with Bastard Noise and Chaos as Shelter), CD
- 2003 – Ingathering of Exiles (with Tidal and Chaos as Shelter), CD
- 2005 – Frogs (with Grundik+Slava), CD
- 2006 – Cherries (with Agnivolok), CD
- 2006 – Festivemood (with Ruslan Gross and Ant Weiss), CD
- 2008 – Live in the Head (with Tatsuya Yoshida and Assif Tsahar), CD
- 2009 – Live at Levontin 07.04.2008 (with Grundik+Slava), CD
- 2009 – Credo (with Thunderwheel), CD
- 2009 – Tfila Leyahid/תפילה ליחיד (with Aviv Gadge), CD
- 2009 – Ancient Device (with Kenji Siratori), CD
- 2009 – Archaic Sky (with Kenji Siratori), CD
- 2010 – WHNZ:15:KATER/Dark Water (with Kenji Siratori), CD
- 2010 – Lumberjack Blues (with Thunderwheel), CD, LP
- 2010 – Hot Exhaust (with Assif Tsahar and Haggai Fershtman), CD
- 2012 – Live at Levontin 7 (with Daniel Sarid and Ariel Armoni), CD
- 2013 – !הורה הסלמה (Hora Haslama!) (with הבילויים/Habiluim), CD
- 2013 – Dicunt (with Psoy & Oy Division), CD
- 2015 – HHHH No. 2 ПППП (with Psoy Korolenko), CD
- 2017 – Goy Hands (with Psoy & The Israelifts)
- 2017 – Equine Canine Soldier Whore (with Psoy & The Israelifts), CD
- 2020 – The Unternationale: The Fourth Unternational (Daniel Kahn, Psoy Korolenko and Oy Division), CD
- 2020 – Quit Silence (with Ariel Shibolet), CD
- 2020 – Cold Exhaust (with Assif Tsahar and Haggai Fershtman)
- 2020 – Opera of the Twelfth Hour by Nick Sudnick (ZGA)

=== On collection albums ===
- 2002 – About A Man Falling Apart on V/A Tel Aviv Aftermath (solo-track, as Igor18), CD
- 2002 – Make Law on V/A Tel Aviv Aftermath (with New Jerusalem Defense Force), CD
- 2002 – The Golden Skull on V/A Tel Aviv Aftermath (with Agnivolok), CD
- 2002 – Live 23.10.2001 on V/A Tel Aviv Aftermath (with The Crossfishes), CD
- 2002 – Venus Flytrap on V/A Infernal Proteus (solo-track, as Igor18), 4xCD
- 2003 – Tengri on V/A Tonal Destruction II (with Chaos as Shelter), 3xCD
- 2004 – Hunt For Butterflies on V/A Intercontinental Zvukoprocessing (solo-track, as Igor18), 2xCD
- 2004 – -+ on V/A Intercontinental Zvukoprocessing (solo-track, as Igor18), 2xCD
- 2006 – Untitled on V/A Noisemass 2005 (with The Crossfishes), CD
- 2006 – Gurtuk on V/A Grannittin (solo-track), CD
- 2018 – Веселый Разговор/Cheerful Talk on V/A Веселый Разговор/Cheerful Talk (with Svetlana Ben), CD
- 2018 – Застольная/Zastolnaya on V/A Decalag: Ten Years Of Jetlag (with Leonid Fedorov), CD
- 2020 – No. 2 on V/A Milim Kashot. Vol. 2 (with KIP)
- 2024 – The Loss Of Naivety on VA x IG Obfuscation (with Ilia Gorovitz), LP
