= Maya Dunietz =

Israeli musical artist

Maya Dunietz מאיה דוניץ
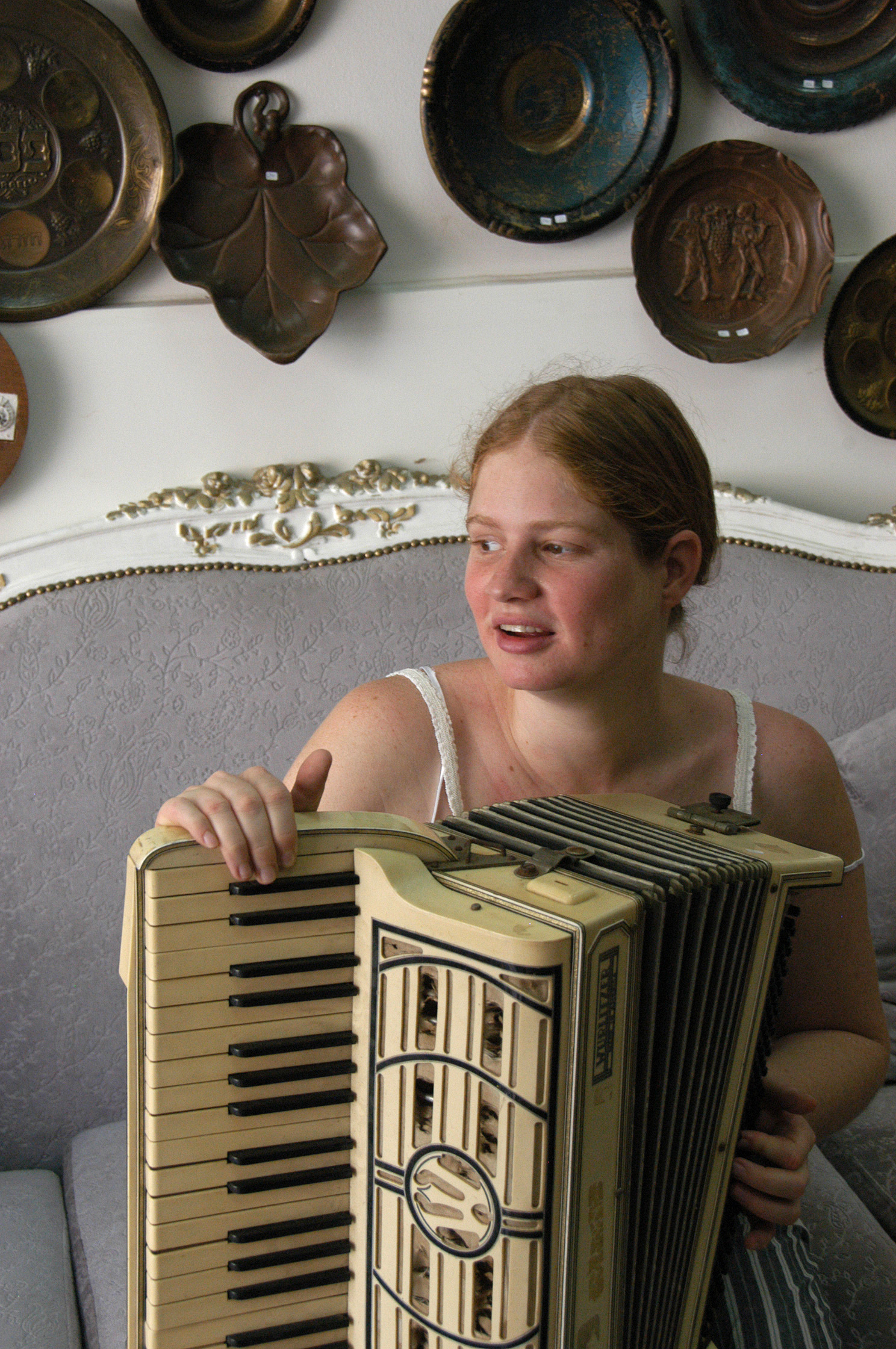
- Maya Dunietz / Photo by Caroline Forbes

Background information
- Born: April 16, 1981 (age 45); Tel Aviv, Israel
- Occupations: Pianist, singer, composer, conductor
- Instrument: Piano

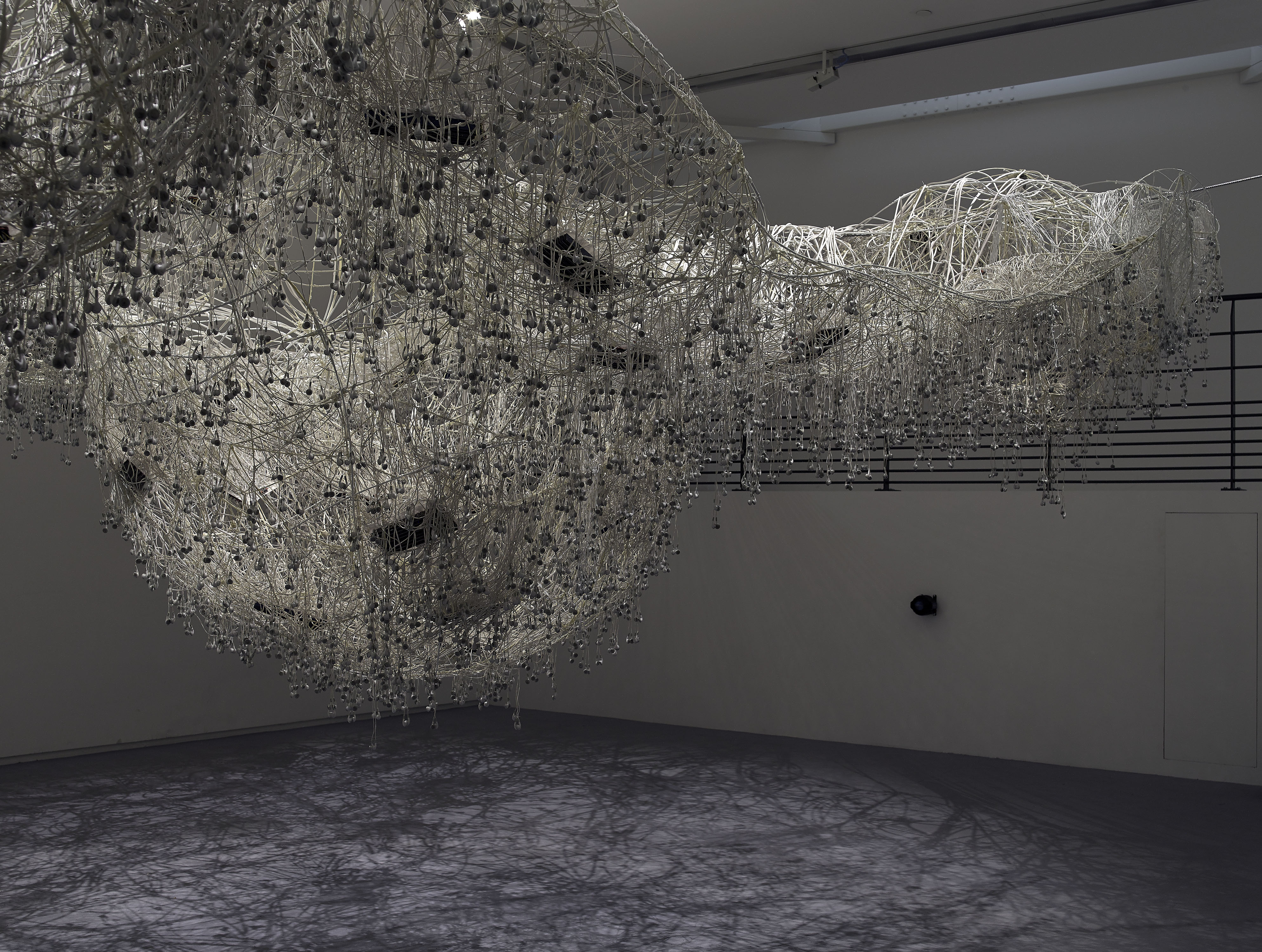
Thicket at Centre Pompidou, 2016 / Photo by Centre Pompidou

Maya Dunietz (Hebrew: מאיה דוניץ; born April 16, 1981), is an Israeli musician and artist, combining a solo career with collaborations with renowned musicians: Emahoy Tsegué-Maryam Guèbrou, Roscoe Mitchell, John Tilbury, Habiluim, and many others. Her works are exhibited in venues such as Centre Pompidou Paris, Athens Onassis Center, Frac Paca, CCA Tel Aviv and Bemis Center for Contemporary Art.

== Musical education and early career ==
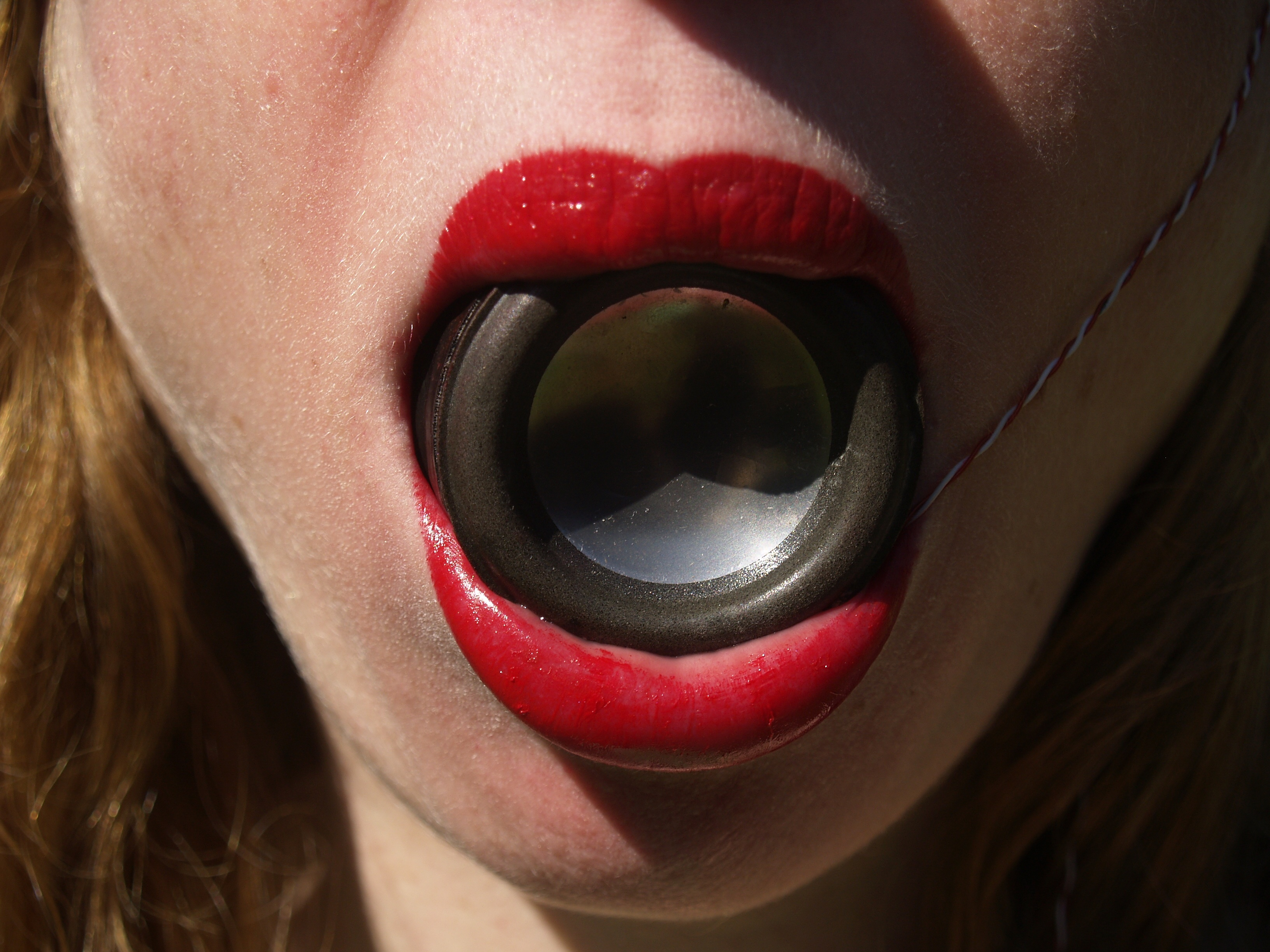
Maya Dunietz in Put It In My Mouth, 2005 / Photo by Dana Dunietz

Dunietz began to study piano at the age of 5 with Jenina Lobenberg. She also studied flute with Moshe Epstein, theory, and solfege with Lev Kogan. At age 10 she took composition with Keren Rosenbaum, who introduced her to a new world of experimentation with sound and ignited an ongoing creative collaboration with Rosenbaum and her Reflex Ensemble. Between 1993-2006 Dunietz studied piano with Naomi Lev, Daniel Gortler, Yaron Godfried, Ofer Bryer, Amit Golan and Alexander Volkov.

Dunietz studied at Thelma Yellin School of Fine Arts majoring in jazz piano, graduating in 1998. During that time, she performed with various projects including Reflex Ensemble, Jerusalem Salsa Band, Avram Felder Big Band and Bat Kol Choir. At 16 years of age, Dunietz traveled to Côte D'ivoire as the young Israeli representative of Jeunesses Musicales for an international music convention, where she met mbira master, singer, and songwriter Chiwoniso Maraire who became her close friend and artistic collaborator until Maraire's passing in 2013.

In 1999, Dunietz enrolled in The New School for Jazz and Contemporary Music, New York. While there she performed with various artists including Aaron Dugan, Shahzad Ismaily, Suzi Ibara, Ikue Mori, Mary Halverson, Daniel Zamir, John Zorn, Shanir Ezra Blumenkranz, Zeena Parkins and others. In the same year, she performed George Antheil's Ballet Mécanique with the New York Shakespeare Theater Company at Hamptons Shakespeare Festival, toured the South-West in duo with writer Yehonatan Geffen and performed solo recitals across the continent.

In 2005, Dunietz enrolled at the Royal Conservatory of The Hague, The Netherlands, and studied composition with Gilius van Bergeijk. There she was introduced to the giant analogue synth walls of Studio1 and began to experiment with electronics. During this year Dunietz composed Tzutzik - for New Ensemble, Amsterdam; Exercise 1, solo piece in two movements for clarinet; Put It In My Mouth, an electro acoustic piece for which she built her first installation performance object - a small speaker placed in the performer's mouth playing the electronic sound track.

In 2013, Dunietz initiated and directed a unique tribute project to Emahoy Tsegué-Maryam Guèbrou as part of the Jerusalem Season of Culture. It included the first-ever publication of Guebrou's piano pieces in a music sheet book and a series of concerts performed by Dunietz and international musicians, presenting Emahoy's abundance of celebrated compositions created over 90 years. Dunietz has been performing recitals of Emahoy's music around the world in venues and festivals such as: Counterflows Festival (Glasgow), Clandestino Festival (Sweden), Café Oto (London), Tectonics Festival (Oslo), The Wulf (LA), Le Guess Who? Festival (Netherlands) and La Gaîté Lyrique (Paris).

== Givol Choir ==
Givol Choir also participated in the production of Garinim, an experiential theater piece directed by Ariel Efraim Ashbel and musically composed by Dunietz. The play received awards for best play and best music in the 2003 Acco Festival of Alternative Israeli Theatre. As a director-composer duo, Dunietz and Ashbel created and continue to create stage pieces, art performances and installations internationally.

== Bands ==
Since 2000, Dunietz has appeared in various bands as a band member or guest singer/player/arranger. Notable projects include the Midnight Peacocks, Eatliz, Boom Pam, Oy Division, Pezz, Malox, Rona Keinan, Noam Rotem, Cheveu, and Habiluim - with whom she continued to play up to the band's break-up, in 2014.

Between 2000-2003, Dunietz toured Mozambique, Angola, Zimbabwe, and Scandinavia with the Women's Voice project led by Malika Makouf Rasmussen. During that time, she was introduced to the concept of joik - a unique form of cultural expression of the Sami people in Sápmi, Northern Europe. A joik is the evocation or depiction of a thing through voice (as opposed to a song, which is about that thing). This concept deeply influenced Dunietz and it resonates with her work ever since.

== Free improvisation and experimental music ==
In 2004 Dunietz began a new musical practice of free improvisation, deeply influenced by the values of this musical practice. She approached clarinet player, painter, and poet Harold Rubin and began a collaboration that lasted until his passing, in 2020. The duo's home venue was at Hagada Hasmalit (English: The Left Bank) in Tel Aviv, where they played hundreds of improv concerts collaborating with numerous local and international artists. The duo also performed at the FMP Total Music Meeting in Berlin. Dunietz later recorded two albums of free improvisation music - one in trio with Yoni Silver and Harold Rubin (Mono Musical Suite for Three Manic Musicians), and one with John Edwards and Steve Noble (Cousin It). Dunietz continues to play free improvisation concerts worldwide with various collaborators. Previous collaborations include: Evan Parker, Eddie Prévost, John Tilbury, Alvin Curran, Ghedalia Tazartes, Lori Goldstone, Fritz Welch, Michelle Guay, Okkyung Lee, Tom White, Nino Biton and The Magreb Orchestra, Jewlia Eisenberg, Shahad Ismaily, Toychestra USA, David Moss, Bari Saharof, Rami Fortis, David Broza, Boom Pam, Steve Noble, Yedo Gibson, Marcio Mattos, Yuka Yamamoto, Shanir Ezra Blumenkranz, Mike Patton, John Butcher, Ilan Volkov, Aaron Dugan, Matisyahu, Assif Zahar, Ravid Kahalani, Desert Blues, Guillaume Villtard, Neil Davidson, Johnny Chang, Ana-Maria Avram, Hildur Gudnsadottir, Stephen O'Malley, Iancu Dumitrescu, Oren Ambarchi, Daniel Higgs, Steve Beresford, Veryan Weston, Tania Chen and more.

== Compositions ==
Dunietz's compositions include solos, choir, ensemble, orchestral and electro-acoustic works. She utilizes various writing techniques including graphic scores, text scores and more. In her compositions, she explores micro-tonality, natural harmonics, and open scores, continuously experimenting with new tools and techniques.

Dunietz's compositions were commissioned and performed by Saar Berger (Ensemble Modern), Ansamblu Hyperion La Ateneul Roman, Reflex Ensemble, Meitar Ensemble, The Tel Aviv Art Ensemble, Bat Kol Choir, The New Ensemble, 21st Century Ensemble, Mannheim Festival, The GIO, The East-West Orchestra, Shalem Broken Instrument Orchestra, Tectonics Festival Iceland, The Voice Studies tape series and more.

Recent selected pieces include - Hai Shirim - an 18 song song cycle for choir and ensemble in Arabic, Figaro's Dream - a solo piece for French Horn, Broken - for an orchestra of broken instruments and regular orchestra, and Chikos - a performative piece created in collaboration with Ariel Efraim Ashbel for two performers, two cellos and piano. Dunietz composed for films and theater plays, among them an original children's choir piece for Zamach, a film created by artist Yael Bartana which premiered in the 2011 Venice Biennale.

In 2010 Dunietz took part in an ensemble concert playing compositions by Iancu Dumisterscu and Ana Maria Avram, as pianist and flutist. Their music influenced her greatly and this event ignited a deep friendship. Dumitrescu and Avram invited Dunietz to compose pieces for Hyperion ensemble and also play in the group (Olive Tree, 2011, premiered at George Enescu Festival, Bucharest, God Ink, 2012, premiered on Hyperion ensemble EU tour) and plays in the ensemble on various occasions.

== Exhibitions ==
Maya Dunietz presented solo exhibitions at Centre Pompidou, Paris (2018), Frac Provence-Alpes-Côte d’Azur, Marseille (2018), CCA Tel Aviv (2015), The Wave Cave Gallery, Los Angeles (2015), The Artists Residence, Herzelia (2021) and Bemis Center for Contemporary Art, Omaha (2022).

In 2017, she was a guest artist at the Cité internationale des arts in Paris. Her work Thicket is part of the permanent collection at the Centre Pompidou, Paris.

Selected group exhibitions include: What's the Connection between Kung-Fu and Ice-Cream? (2007), Hapzura, The Israeli Center for Digital Art, Holon, curator: Eyal Danon; On the Road to Nowhere (2007), Ashdod Art Museum, Ashdod, curator: Dr. Aya Lurie; Airsculpture1 (2013), Arnolfini Center For Contemporary Arts, Bristol, curator: Alastair Cameron; Above and Beyond (2018), Mekudeshet Festival Jerusalem, curator: Yehudit Shlosberg; Returning to Nature (2021), Botanical Garden Jerusalem, curator: Hadas Maor; Glitch. The Art of Interference (2023), Pinakothek der Moderne, curator: Franziska Kunze.

== Performances ==
Dunietz's performance projects are diverse in format and approach and range from slight gestures expanding the rules of a ceremony in a concert hall (Six Waves 2013) to mass crowd participation performances (Kebab 2004). She often creates location-based multimedia systems (Kurzstrecke 2012, Boom 2014), Her performances include commissions by Palais de Tokyo (Boom - video projection, electronics, voice, piano 2014), Ausland Berlin (Kurzstrecke - installation, performance and publication 2012), Tectonics Festival Iceland - Harpa center (Open Mic Knight - installation and performance 2012), Hateiva (Chikos- collaboration with Ariel Efraim Ashbel - performance 2009). Nature and mediums of her performative events vary according to circumstances.

== Performed repertoire ==
As pianist and singer mostly, Dunietz has performed a wide repertoire, including world premieres of pieces by Erel Paz, Kiki Keren Hoss, Keren Rosenbaum, Dieter Schnebel - notably his song cycle Liebe - Leid (2013) which was composed for her, Alvin Curran and Ivana Kiss. Performed repertoire also includes collaborations such as duo with pianist John Tilbury (Compositions for two pianos by Morton Feldman, King's Place, London 2012), The 21st Century Ensemble and Noa Frenkel (N’shima by Iannis Xenakis, Hateiva, Jaffa 2014), Frank Denier and the Iceland Symphony Orchestra conducted by Ilan Volkov (Music for 13 by John Cage, Tectonics festival, 2012) and more.

== Awards ==
- Tel Aviv Municipality and Rabinovich Foundation – Givol Choir
- 2003 Best Soundtrack – Garinim – Acco Festival of Alternative Israeli Theatre
- 2021 Best Original Score – That Orchestra With the Broken Instruments – Israeli Documentary Film Awards

== Discography ==
- 2005 Midnight Peacocks, It's a Brutal Machine, Earsay
- 2006 Habiluim, Bereavement and Failure, NMC
- 2006 Midnight Peacocks, Three, Earsay
- 2008 Harold Rubin, Yoni Silver, Maya Dunietz, Mono Musical Suite for Three Manic Musicians Levontin
- 2008 Boom Pam, Puerto Rican Nights, 8th Note
- 2009 Ori Mark, Don't Talk about Sex, 8th Note
- 2009 Itamar Rothschild, Itamar Rothschild, Hed Artzi
- 2011 Maya Dunietz, John Edwards, Steve Noble, Cousin It, Hopscotch Records
- 2012 Iancu Dumitrescu/Ana-Maria Avram, Live in Israel, Edition Modern
- 2013 Habiluim, Escalation Hora, independent release
- 2014 Alastor: The Book of Angels Vol. 21; Eyvind Kang
- 2014 Cheveu, BUM, Born Bad Records
- 2015 Voice Studies 18, My Dance The Skull
- 2016 Usurper with Alex Drool, Maya Dunietz, Eran Sachs and Ilan Volkov, Tutore Burlato
- 2017 Ghédalia Tazartès + Maya Dunietz,Schulevy Maker, Holotype Editions
- 2017 Maya Dunietz and Tom White, Summer Crash, Singing Knives
- 2021 Free The Dolphin, Raw Tapes Records
- 2021 Five Chilling Mammoths, independent release
- 2023 Thank You Tree, Raw Tapes Records

== Film scores ==
- 2011 Red Nose, directed by Eldad Prives
- 2011 Zamach (theme song), directed by Yael Bartana
- 2016 Made like a gun (Palsar Himalaya) directed by Eldad Prives
