= Kruzenshtern & Parohod =

Russophone Israel klezmer-rock band

Kruzenshtern & Parohod Крузенштерн и Пароход
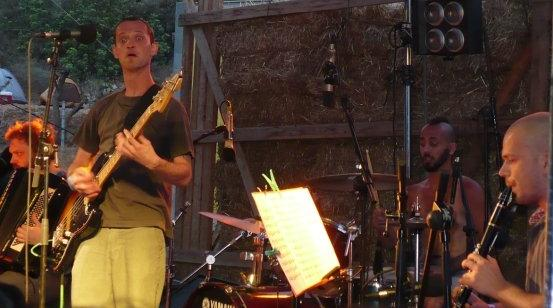
- Kruzenshtern & Parohod at Hutz-Mi-Ze 2 music festival in Israel in 2008

Background information
- Also known as: KIP
- Origin: Tel Aviv, Israel
- Genres: Jazz, progressive rock
- Years active: 2002–present
- Label: Auris Media Records
- Members: Igor Krutogolov; Ruslan Gross; Guy Shechter
- Past members: Olya Yelensky; Boris Marzinovsky

Kruzenshtern & Parohod (Russian: Крузенштерн и Пароход) (KIP) is an Israeli klezmer-rock band from Tel Aviv founded by the Israeli musician and composer Igor Krutogolov.

The name of the band is a pun easily recognizable by post-Soviet Russophones. The pun is based on a catch phrase "Admiral Ivan Fyodorovich Kruzenshtern, a man and a steamship" from the popular Soviet animated film series, Prostokvashino. The phrase was coined from the title of a requiem poem by Vladimir Mayakovsky, To Comrade Nette, a Steamship and a Man. The fictional steamship's name “Admiral Ivan Fyodorovich Kruzenshtern“ implies the Russian admiral and explorer Adam Johann von Krusenstern and a real sailing ship named Kruzenshtern. "Parohod" means "steamship" in Russian.

== History ==
=== Kruzenshtern & Parohod ===
The band was formed in 2002 by Igor Krutogolov (bass, voice) and his friends Ruslan Gross (clarinet) and Guy Shechter (drums). The band's style was branded "klezmercore" (a blend of “klezmer” and "hardcore").

The band's debut album The Craft of Primitive Klezmer was released in July 2003 by the Israeli label Auris Media Records and was followed by a number of live performances due to the album's great success in Israel and abroad. The album was compared to the best recordings of the Radical Jewish Culture series released by John Zorn's record label Tzadik.

In November 2004, Auris Media released the band's bootleg Live in Karaganda, a live experimental jazz performance at the Barby club in Tel Aviv on November 30, 2004. The record had a unique cover designed by Igor Krutogolov for each of its 27 copies that were immediately sold out after the show. In the same month, the band released its second album Songs. All of the songs for the album were composed by Krutogolov (except for the cover of John Zorn's "Meholalot"). The style of the album was described as experimental jazz and folk. The album was mixed and mastered by the Ahvak soundman Udi Koomran.

In 2005, Kruzenshtern & Parohod recorded a live session in the Noize rehearsal studio in Tel Aviv. The record was released in 2012 as the album Noize 2005.

In October 2006, the band released a split with the French duet Vialka. Olya Yelensky on accordion joined the band as a fourth member. A joint live performance and a presentation of the split album took place in November 2006 at the Levontin 7 club in Tel Aviv.

In February 2008, the band recorded a live improvisational performance with the Ukrainian band I Drug Moy Gruzovik and released the album Melekh (2008) under the joint name Gruzovik i Kruzenshtern.

In 2008, Igor Krutogolov and Ruslan Gross of Kruzenshtern & Parohod recorded the album Love for Three Cockroaches in collaboration with the Polish band Mitch & Mitch. The record also featured the Israeli accordionist Boris Marzinovsky (Charming Hostess, Panic Ensemble). The album premiered in December 2009 at the OFF Festival in Katowice, Poland. The album was released in 2010 and received enthusiastic reviews. The music for the album was created by Igor Krutogolov in the form of an opera composed by the imaginary composer Zelig Rabichnyak. The album booklet included a detailed description of Zelig Rabichnyak's life and career, a special addition created by Igor Krutogolov.

In 2008, Kruzenshtern & Parohod was joined by the accordionist Boris Marzinovsky. The band changes its style leaving behind the Jewish and Klezmer motives. The music becomes more complex revealing the many sides of Krutogolov's talent as a composer. In December 2008, the band recorded an album, released as The Hidden Album in 2012. At the same period, the band recorded an experimental hardcore-jazz-klezmer album with the American musician Eugene Robinson (Oxbow) released in 2015 as Hidden Album Volume II on LP.

=== KIV Orchestra ===
In 2012, Kruzenshtern & Parohod united with Marlise Freshville and Eric Borosh from Vialka duet to form a collaboration project KIV Orchestra. The band launched a European tour (France, Belgium, Germany, Poland, the Czech Republic, Switzerland) and recorded three consecutive albums: La Roue (2012), Extension (2013) and Whole (2013). As part of the European tour, the band members participated in the recording of a short film about the 22nd Jewish Culture Festival in Kraków created by the Israeli musician Ophir Kutiel (Kutiman) for his "Thru The City" project.

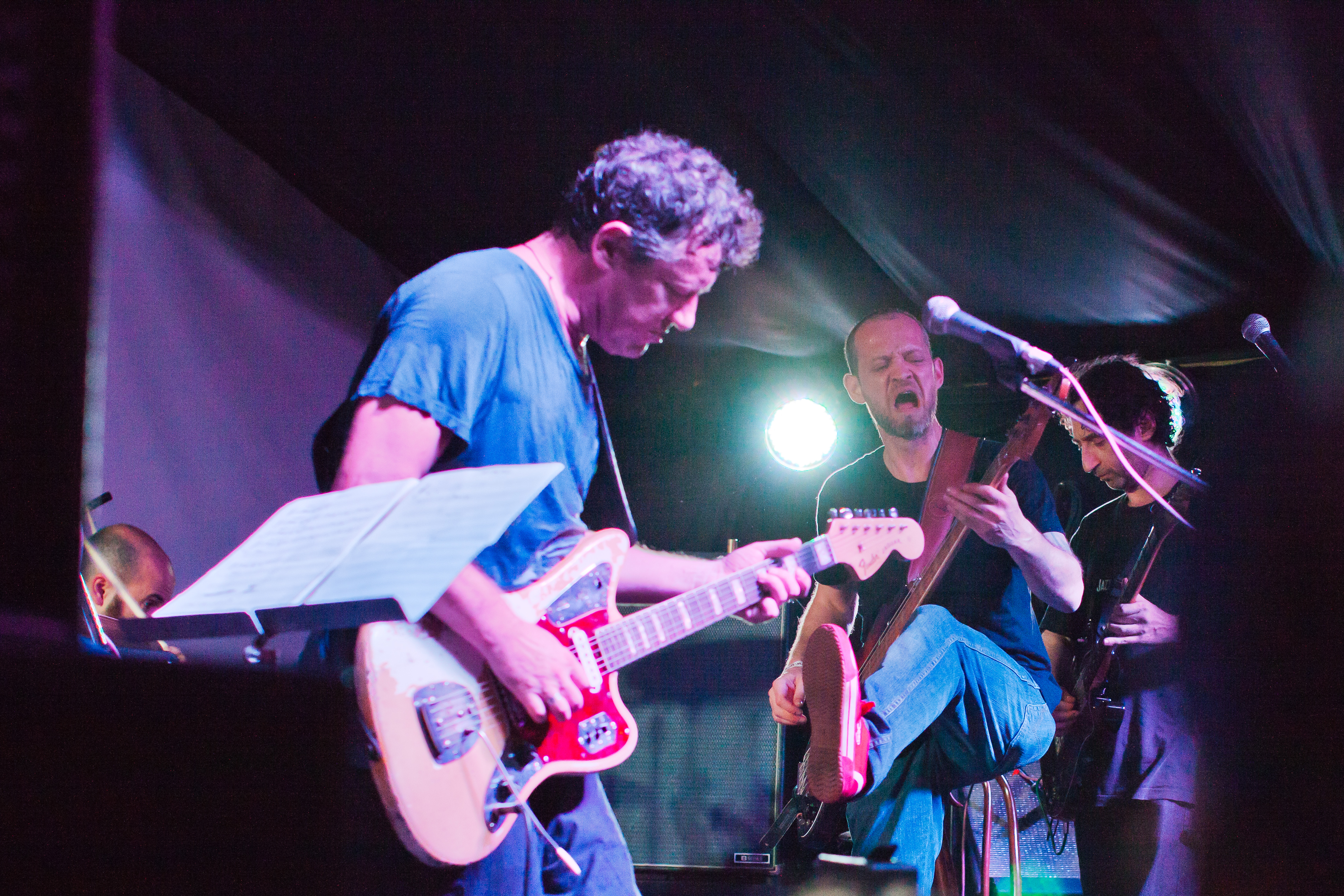
Fedorov & Kruzenshtern at the Gogol club in Moscow in 2013

In 2013, Kruzenshtern & Parohod collaborated with Leonid Fedorov, the leader of the Russian band Auktyon, and recorded the album Byt vezde (Everywhere) to the verses of the Russian poet Dmitry Ozersky. The album was presented on September 6, 2013, at the Gogol club in Moscow and on September 8 at the A2 club in Saint Petersburg. The show at the A2 club in Saint Petersburg was issued on DVD in 2014. The album was released under the joint name Fedorov & Kruzenshtern.

=== KIP ===
In November 2015, Kruzenshtern & Parohod recorded a new album HYMNS at the DTH Studios in Moscow, Russia. On the next day, the band presented the album at the DOM Culture Center in Moscow. The music on the album differs greatly from the previous band's works, so the band's name was changed to the abbreviated name KIP. The album was mixed and mastered by James Plotkin. The band is back to its initial three-member line-up: Krutogolov, Gross and Shechter.

In 2020, KIP released the album Songs of Love. The album's track "#2" premiered on the metal collection album Milim Kashot. Vol. 2 (2020). The album had very enthusiastic reviews and was rated one of the most successful metal albums of the year 2020 by the Machine Music magazine.

== Discography ==
- 2003 – The Craft of Primitive Klezmer, CD (reissued in 2007, CD)
- 2004 – Songs, CD
- 2004 – Live In Karaganda, CD
- 2006 – Kruzenshtern & Parohod / Vialka, split CD, (reissued in 2012, split LP)
- 2008 – Melekh (feat. IDMG), CD
- 2010 – Love for Three Cockroaches (feat. Mitch & Mitch), CD
- 2011 – Noize 2005, CD
- 2012 – Hidden Album, CD
- 2012 – La Roue (as KIV Orchestra), CD
- 2013 – Extension (as KIV Orchestra), CD
- 2013 – Whole (as KIV Orchestra), LP
- 2013 – Everywhere (with Leonid Fyodorov, CD, LP, DVD (2014)
- 2015 – Hidden Album Volume II (feat. Eugene S. Robinson), LP
- 2016 – Hymns (as KIP), CD
- 2020 – Songs of Love (as KIP)
