= Spoiwo =

Polish post-rock band

- Origin: Gdańsk, Poland
- Genres: Post-rock; instrumental
- Years active: 2009–present
- Members: Piotr Gierzyński; Krzysztof Sarnek; Krzysztof Zaczyński; Patryk Piątkowski
- Past members: Simona Jambor; Paweł Bereszczyński
- Website: spoiwo.bandcamp.com

Spoiwo is a musical group created in 2009 in Gdańsk, Poland. Until the end of 2018, the band had five members. In 2019, two of the members left the band (Simona Jambor and Paweł Bereszczyński), and instead they were joined by Patryk Piątkowski. On 13 March 2015, Spoiwo released their debut album, Salute Solitude. They played at many post-rock festivals, including Dunk!festival, Whoneedslyrics?! festival, and various Polish events such as OFF Festival and Expect Delays Fest.

== Band members ==
Current

- Piotr Gierzyński
- Patryk Piątkowski (since 2019)
- Krzysztof Zaczyński
- Krzysztof Sarnek

Past

- Paweł Bereszczyński (2009–2018)
- Simona Jambor (2010–2018)

== Nominations ==
- Discovery of the Year for "Pomeranian Storms"
- Best band of 2015 for Arctic Drones
- 11th best post-rock album of 2015 for Arctic Drones
- Best post-rock album of 2015 by postrockerNL
- Best debut of 2015 and best Polish post-rock album of 2015 by Post-Rock Pl
- Top 10 best Polish albums of 2015 by Music Is
- Top 20 most interesting Polish albums of 2015 by Uwolnij Muzykę
- Pomeranian Music Award DOKI 2015 - nominations in the categories Album of the Year, Artist of the Year, and New Face; won in New Face category
- Best concert band by Pomeranian Music Award DOKI 2016
