= Bastard Disco =

Polish alternative rock band

- Origin: Warsaw
- Genres: alternative rock; post-punk; post-hardcore; emo
- Label: Antena Krzyku
- Members: Pawel Cholewa, Kamil Fejfer, Marek Lorent-Kamiński, Iurii Kasianenko
- Website: https://bastarddisco.bandcamp.com/

Bastard Disco is a Polish alternative rock band from Warsaw, formed in 2015 by Kamil Fejfer and Pawel Cholewa.

== History ==
Bastard Disco was formed in 2015 in Warsaw by Kamil Fejfer (guitar) and Pawel Cholewa (bass), later joined by Marek Lorent-Kamiński (drums) and Iurii Kasianenko (vocals), replacing former singer and guitarist Karol Kruczek. The band recorded demo in November 2015 and played their first shows in Warsaw.

The band recorded their debut album Warsaw Wasted Youth in 2017 with Marcin Klimczak at Mustache Ministry Studio. The album was released by Polish indie label Antena Krzyku and got numerous favorable reviews in media and press. Their debut album was described as an intense alternative rock with its roots in nineteenth Washington D.C. indie and post-hardcore scene. The band toured in support of their debut LP ending with an act on OFF Festival 2017 in Katowice.

Later in 2018 the band recorded a split cassette release with Guiding Lights and started working on the second album. The album called "China Shipping" was released in May 2019 by label Antena Krzyku. Like the debut album, the album was recorded by Marcin Klimczak at Mustache Ministry Studio. The second album material showed more of an emo side of the band. The album got numerous favorable reviews. The album release was followed by numerous shows played in Poland and Ukraine. In fall 2019, the band played live TV-show "Scena Alternatywna" on TVP Kultura channel.

The band started working on their third LP material in 2020 during the first lockdown of COVID pandemic, and recorded in November 2021 in Wieloślad Studio in Warsaw and mixed by Zack Weeks in God City Studio in Salem. The album titled "Satelity" was released in April 2022.

== Discography ==
Title	Details
Warsaw Wasted Youth	Released: 2017; Label: Antena Krzyku; Formats: LP, CD
China Shipping	Released: 2019; Label: Antena Krzyku; Formats: LP, CD
Satelity	Released: 2022

== Musical style and influences ==
Bastard Disco is mostly considered a post-hardcore band with emo, post-punk, and noise rock influences. Some of Bastard Disco's influences include Quicksand, Fugazi, Pixies, Sonic Youth, The Smashing Pumpkins, and Jawbox.

== Members ==
- Pawel Cholewa – bass, backing vocals
- Kamil Fejfer – guitar
- Marek Lorent-Kamiński – drums
- Iurii Kasianenko – vocals, synths
