= Harold Rubin =

Israeli artist and free jazz musician (1932–2020)

Harold Rubin הארולד רובין
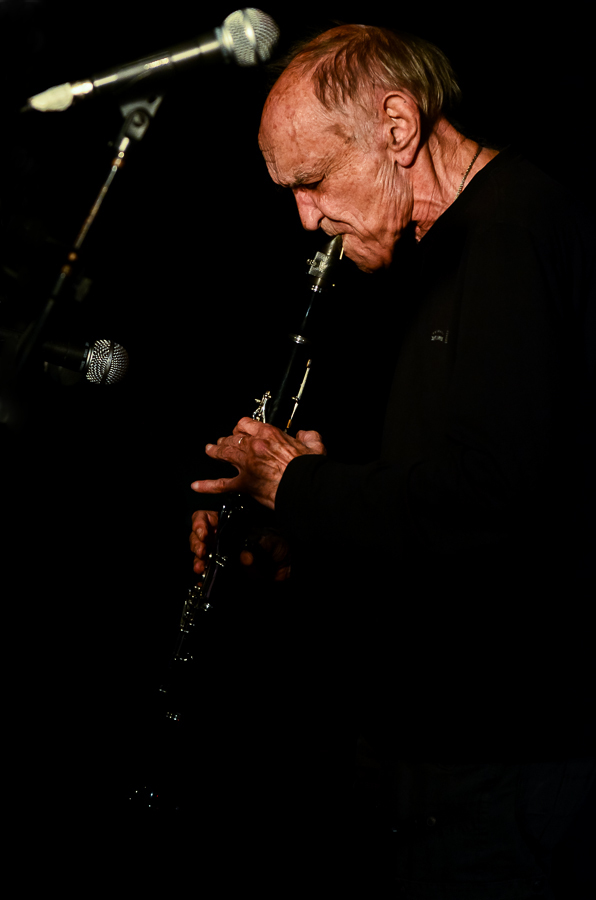
- Harold Rubin at Levontin 7, Tel Aviv, 2013. Photo by Mark Segal.

Background information
- Born: 13 May 1932; Johannesburg, South Africa
- Died: 1 April 2020 (aged 87)
- Genre: Jazz
- Occupation: Musician
- Instrument: Clarinet

Harold Rubin (Hebrew: הארולד רובין; 13 May 1932 – 1 April 2020) was a South African-born Israeli artist and free jazz clarinetist.

== Life and career ==
Rubin was born in Johannesburg, South Africa on 13 May 1932. He attended the Jeppe High School for Boys and received private instruction in the fine arts. Instructed in the classical clarinet as a teenager, he developed a fascination with jazz and began playing at the Skyline Night Club at eighteen. Enrolled as an architecture student at the University of the Witwatersrand, he completed his professional studies after further education in London.

Rubin's creative endeavours in South African society during the 1950s and 1960s dissented against the apartheid-era Afrikaner establishment by defying the country's racist social norms. Rubin organised his own jazz group in the 1950s, snuck into black townships, and played alongside black musicians. Rubin's visual artwork was first exhibited in 1956. Among Rubin's contributions to the South African fine arts in this spirit was the 1961 Sharpeville, a series of drawings devoted to the brutality of the Apartheid-era authorities during the Sharpeville massacre in 1960.

Rubin's most controversial project on the South African art scene of the 1960s was My Jesus, a provocative rendering of the crucifixion in which Jesus Christ appeared as a nude black figure with the head of a monster. The work contained the inscription "I forgive you O Lord, for you know not what you do" – a sardonically reversed "Father forgive them, for they know not what they do" – and depicted the naked figure with a slight hint of an erection. The controversial image was put on display alongside other anti-establishment works at a Johannesburg gallery in 1962. The exhibition caused such furore that the government sent the police to shut down the exhibition and referred its artwork for an examination by its censorship board. Rubin became the second South African to be charged with blasphemy.

Acquitted in court of the alleged blasphemy in March 1963, Rubin protested the repressive political environment by leaving the country for Israel. He quickly re-established himself in Tel Aviv, and was employed as an architect in the office of Arieh Sharon, on projects in Israel and abroad. He taught at an academy of architecture and design between the 1960s and his retirement in 1986.

Rubin began creating visual art as a critique and commentary on the militaristic aspect of Israeli society as early as the 1960s. The anti-war subject was a prime subject of Rubin's work during the 1980s – a decade witnessing the 1982 invasion of Lebanon and the tensions aroused by the increasingly visible peace movement, and marked by the creation of such works as The Anatomy of a War Widow (1984), a series of twenty-two black-and-white pictures. The caustic Homage to Rabbi Kahane, which portrayed the outspoken ultra-nationalist Rabbi Meir Kahane as a Jewish Nazi, was pulled off the wall by a Knesset member when hung at a Haifa gallery in 1985. The proceeds raised from an August 1987 exhibition and auction of art by Rubin and other Israeli artists at the Meimad Gallery in Tel Aviv were donated to a fund for educational activities and promotion of the values of democracy and freedom of speech dedicated to Emil Grunzweig, an Israeli teacher and Peace Now activist murdered in 1983 by a grenade thrown at a Jerusalem peace rally. Rubin's drawings and paintings have been exhibited in Israel, South Africa, the United States, and Germany since the 1960s.

Rubin returned to playing jazz in late 1979, having previously given up performance for more than a decade after his emigration from Africa. He became a founding member of the 1980s Zaviot jazz quartet, which recorded albums with the label Jazzis Records and performed at festivals and clubs in Israel and Europe until its break-up in 1989. Rubin's more recent appearances have included performances with Ariel Shibolet, Assif Tsahar, Daniel Sarid, Maya Dunietz, and Yoni Silver.

Awarded the Landau Award in tribute to his contributions to jazz music in 2008, he continued to play jazz with musicians of the younger generations in Tel Aviv.

Harold Rubin and his first wife, Riva Wainer, married in 1957, separated in the 1970s and divorced in 1975. Since 1976 he has been married to Miriam Kainy, a well-recognized Israeli dramatist particularly known for plays concerned with the subject of Jewish–Arab relations and feminist themes. His family included two sons from his first marriage, as well as one daughter and two stepdaughters from his second.

Rubin was an avowed atheist.

He died on 1 April 2020, aged 87.
