= Igor Krutogolov's Toy Orchestra =

Israeli experimental band

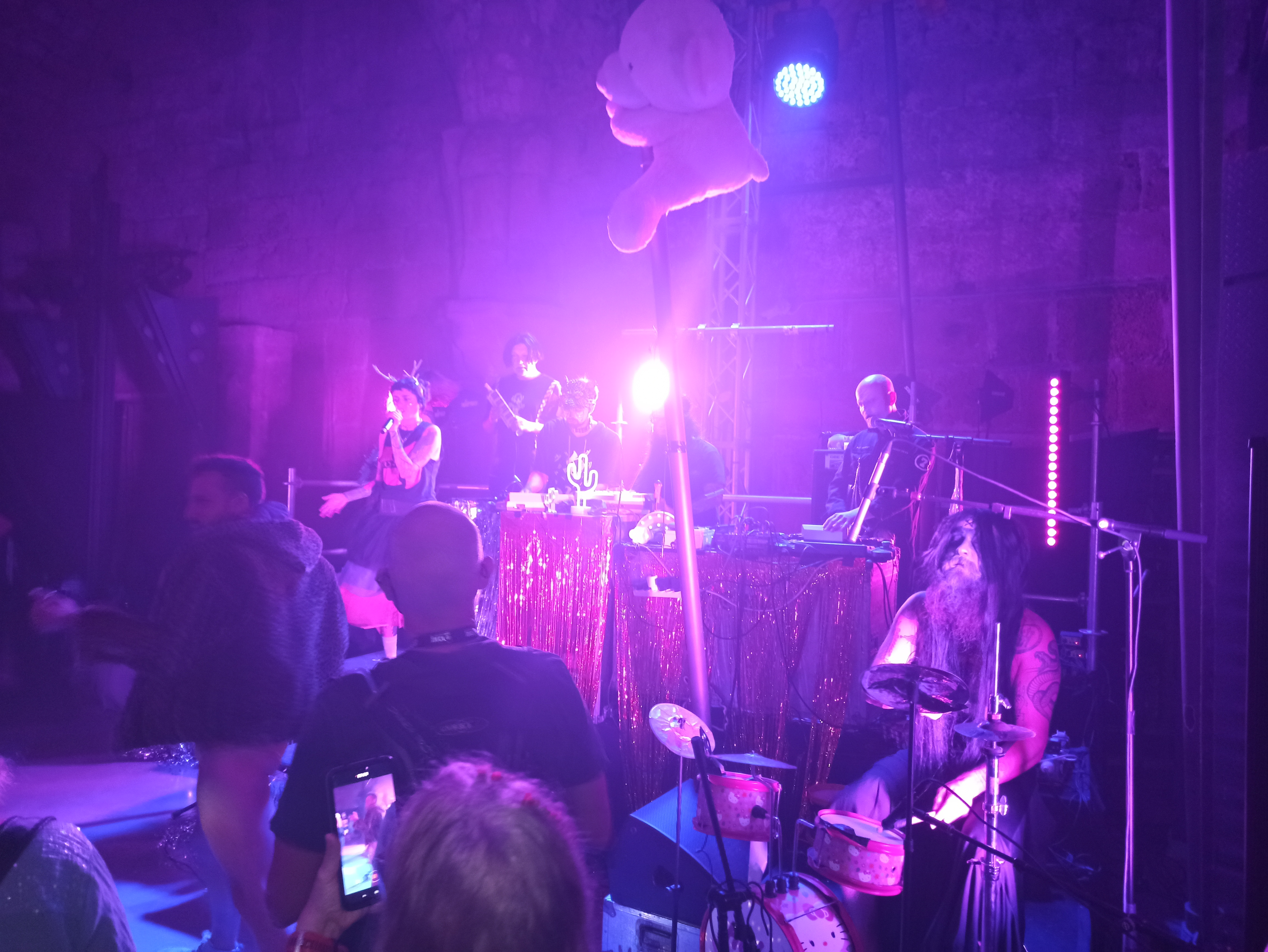
- Igor Krutogolov's Toy Orchestra at the Acre Fringe Theatre Festival in 2021

Background information
- Also known as: Igor Krutogolov's Karate Band
- Origin: Tel Aviv, Israel
- Genres: experimental rock, disco, noise, toy music
- Years active: 2005–present
- Label: Auris Media Records
- Members: Igor Krutogolov; Yam Umi; Roy Chen; Victor Levin; Mihai Cernea; Amir Buksbaum

Igor Krutogolov's Toy Orchestra (Hebrew: תזמורת הצעצועים של איגור קרוטוגולוב) is an Israeli experimental band founded by the Israeli musician and composer Igor Krutogolov. The band was formed in 2005 and is based in Tel Aviv, Israel. The band has released five albums and has taken part in international festivals and acclaimed cinema and theatre productions.

== Musical style ==
The band's music has a unique style due to a blend of specific recognizable sound produced by toy instruments and a big variety of genres covered. The band's first album represented a mixture of styles and was described as "experimental noise comedy". Further albums contained both original songs with gibberish lyrics composed by Igor Krutogolov as well as a number of innovative and complex arrangements of songs of various genres including funk metal, industrial, alternative rock, folk, jazz, electronic music etc. The band has lately produced a number of original disco songs influenced by the band's recent involvement in theatre and cinema work.

== History ==
=== Igor Krutogolov's Karate Band ===
In 2005, Igor Krutogolov gathered a group of fellow musicians and friends to form a toy orchestra named Igor Krutogolov's Karate Band. The idea of the project was to use only toy musical instruments and toys to produce music. The band consisted of 11 members including Igor Krutogolov (composer, toy guitar, toy clarinet, voice), Ruslan Gross (toy guitar), Guy Schechter (toy drums), Olya Yelensky (toy keyboard), Ido Azaria (toy clarinet), Victor Levin (toy clarinet), Leonid Ulitsky (toy saxophone), Gregory Bado (toy trumpet), Tanya Bogoslavsky (toy xylophone), Einav Cohen (rubber toys), and Shelly Dublinsky (rubber toys). The band's first performance took place on April 7, 2005, at the Green Racoon club in Tel Aviv following the literary evening of the Russian postmodern writer Vladimir Sorokin.

The band's first album Children 4 Muzik was released in October 2005. The album was presented in November 2005 at the avant-garde music festival at the Zappa club in Tel Aviv.

In 2006, the band recorded a 56-minute cover of "Consume Red" by the Japanese musician Otomo Yoshihide and released it as a digital album Plays Ground Zero: Consume Red in 2021 during the COVID-19 pandemic.

The album How to Be a Crocodile was released in 2014 and was presented at the Levontin 7 club in Tel Aviv on February 27, 2014. The band recorded original songs to the gibberish lyrics written by Igor Krutogolov under the nickname Mursulik. The album also includes the song to the poem by Daniil Kharms "Zhuravli i Korabli" ("The Cranes and the Ships"). The album featured a new line-up: Igor Krutogolov (toy guitar, vocals, toy accordion, toy noise), Guy Shechter (toy drums), Victor Levin (toy clarinet), Mihai Cernea (toy clarinet), Naomi Rosin (toy clarinet), Dror Pikielny (toy clarinet), Neil Kalman (toy clarinet, toy trumpet), Slava Frenklakh (toy keyboards, toy piano), Niv Majar (toy glockenspiel, toy xylophone, pigs), and Inbar Livne Bar-On (vocals). All the music on the album was composed by Igor Krutogolov.

=== Igor Krutogolov's Toy Orchestra ===
In 2017, Igor Krutogolov's Karate Band was joined by a vocalist Yam Umi, the singer with the Israeli electric hardcore band Killing Machine. Thanks to Umi's voice, the band acquired new sound and the band's name was changed to Igor Krutogolov's Toy Orchestra. In 2017, the band released a new album Roots Over Roots consisting of two covers ("Roots Over Roots" by Sepultura and "Over" by Portishead). The band was also joined by the Israeli-British singer Yifeat Ziv (The Hazelnuts/האחיות לוז). The new line-up gave a concert in December 2018 at the Levontin 7 club in Tel Aviv.

In 2019, Israeli drummer Roy Chen (Megason, Malox) joined the band. The group performed live as part of the cultural and educational project "Eshkolot", supported by the Embassy of Israel in Russia. The band performed new covers, "Little God in My Hands" (by Swans) and "Guerrilla Radio" (by Rage Against the Machine) as well as other band's songs, including "Zhuravli i korabli" ("The Cranes and the Ships") performed by the Russian singer Anna Khvostenko. The concert program also included a masterclass for kids and the kids’ participation in the live performance with the band.

In 2022, the band released the album Live at Musrara Mix recorded at the Musrara Mix Festival 2020 in Jerusalem and issued two singles, "Bebe La Sangre" (2022) and "Sucky" (2022).

== Film and theatre productions ==
In 2018, the band collaborated with the Israeli-American director, writer and artist Roee Rosen on the film Kafka for Kids (2022). The idea to use the toy orchestra in the film belonged to Igor Krutogolov, who composed music for the film. This brilliant idea, according to Roy Rosen, significantly influenced the visual and musical direction of the film. The band's musicians performed on set as part of the film's cast, with Yam Umi and Yifeat Ziv also playing additional parts. The film sketches including three songs performed live by the band, with Yifeat Ziv as a lead singer, were presented at the Steirischer Herbst Art Festival on September 22, 2018, at the Graz Orpheum theatre in Graz, Austria. The film Kafka for Kids premiered at the 2022 International Film Festival in Rotterdam, Netherlands (IFFR 2022) and was shown at the international film festivals in Marseille, France (FIDMarseille 2022), Curitiba, Brazil (Olhar de Cinema 2022), Lisbon, Portugal (Doclisboa 2022), Vienna, Austria (Viennale 2022) and Copenhagen, Denmark (CPH:DOX 2023). At the FIDMarseille festival, the film was awarded the Camargo Foundation award and the festival's highest prize, Air France Panavision. The film's soundtrack was released on LP in 2022.

In 2021, the band joined a multi-genre theatrical project TOYZZZ in collaboration with the Israeli dance theatre group led by Or Marin and Oran Nahum. The initial intention was to incorporate the band's current songs into the performance, but eventually Igor Krutogolov composed five more songs and co-authored the project. The band's musicians performed and interacted with nine theatre-group dancers in what was described as "a combination of a party, a circus, an orgy and a closed ward". The musical show TOYZZZ premiered at the 2021 Acre Fringe Theatre Festival in Israel and was presented at the festival 11 times. The show won several awards: best show, best design (space, costumes, light and music), best dance and a special prize for musical achievements (to composer Igor Krutogolov, singer Yam Umi and band Igor Krutogolov's Toy Orchestra). The show was presented to a wider audience in December 2021 in Tel Aviv at the Tmuna theatre where it was shown seven times.

== Discography ==
- 2005 – Children 4 Music, CD
- 2014 – How to Be a Crocodile, CD
- 2017 – Roots Over Roots, 7"
- 2021 – Plays Ground Zero: Consume Red
- 2021 – TOYZZZ (soundtrack to show by Or Marin)
- 2022 – Kafka for Kids (soundtrack to film by Roee Rosen), LP
- 2022 – Live At Musrara Mix, CD
- 2022 – Bebe La Sangre (single)
- 2022 – Sucky (single)
