= Midnight Peacocks =

Israeli metal band

- Also known as: The Peacocks
- Origin: Tel Aviv, Israel
- Genres: Alternative metal, oriental metal
- Years active: 2004–present
- Label: EarSay
- Members: Eitan Radoshinsky; Guy Shemi; Yoni Silver; Yoav Zohar
- Past members: Ron Bunker; Matan Ergas; Hagai Fershtman; Hagai Shlezinger
- Website: myspace

Midnight Peacocks is an Israeli alternative power trio band formed from the Plastic Peacocks in 2004.

The band's musical style is a combination of elements of Arabic music, cabaret and hardcore punk and, occasionally, what is called "circus-core". The band has released two studio albums on the independent record label Earsay.

Midnight Peacocks has provided opening acts in Israel for Firewater, Mike Patton and Dub Trio.

== History ==
Soon after the Plastic Peacocks broke up, two of the former members, Eitan Radoshinsky (bass guitar vocals) and Hagai Fershtman (drums) decided to stay together and collaborated with Matan Ergas (guitar and vocals) and form the 'Midnight Peacocks. The new band immediately flew to Germany to record the group's first album It's a Brutal Machine. The album was released in 2006, including the songs "Brutal Machine", "Indian Sun", "Island of the Sun" and "Ganja to the Chairman".

At the end of 2006, Ergas decided to leave the group to focus on his work with the punk rock band Got No Shame, and the guitarist position was taken over by Ron Bunker, a former member of Squid. In 2007, the group released its second studio album Shalosh (from the Hebrew word for "three"). It is kind of a concept album, as it is divided into three parts - the "circus-core" part, the oriental part and the experimental part. Notable songs from the album are "Die", "Pussycat" and "Inside Outside". After its release, the band provided support to Mike Patton in his solo show in Israel and, in 2008, to Dub Trio and Firewater.

The band has since performed nearly everywhere in Israel, and also in Europe. It made its first North American appearance at the SXSW Festival 2009 in Austin, Texas, in 2009.

== Band members ==
Current members

- Eitan Radoshinsky - lead vocals, bass guitar (2004–present)
- Guy Shemi - guitars (2010–present)
- Yoav Zohar - drums (2011–present)
- Yoni Silver - violin

Former members

- Ron Bunker - guitar, vocals (2006–2010)
- Hagai Fershtman - drums, percussion (2004–2007)
- Matan Ergas - guitar, vocals (2004–2006)
- Hagai Shlezinger - drums, percussion (2007–2010)

Despite the fact that the band is considered a power trio, it is actually an ensemble of up to 12 musicians and performers including darbuka players, violin players, a saxophone player and even a belly dancer.

The best known member of the extended-group is Hezzi Shohat, a friend of Radoshinsky, who sings the song "Hasish".

=== Discography ===
- It's a Brutal Machine (2006)
- Shalosh (2007)
- Katastroffa (2017)
