= Habiluim =

Israeli theatrical rock band

Habiluim הבילויים
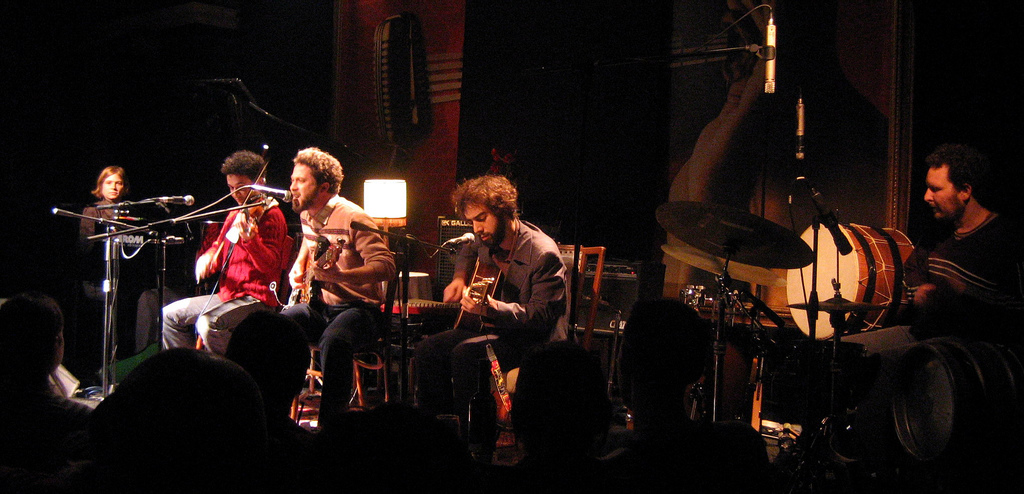

Background information
- Genres: Rock; folk rock
- Years active: 1997-present
- Members: Noam Enbar; Yammi Wisler; Maya Dunietz; Yoni Silver; Shahar Haziza
- Website: www.habiluim.com

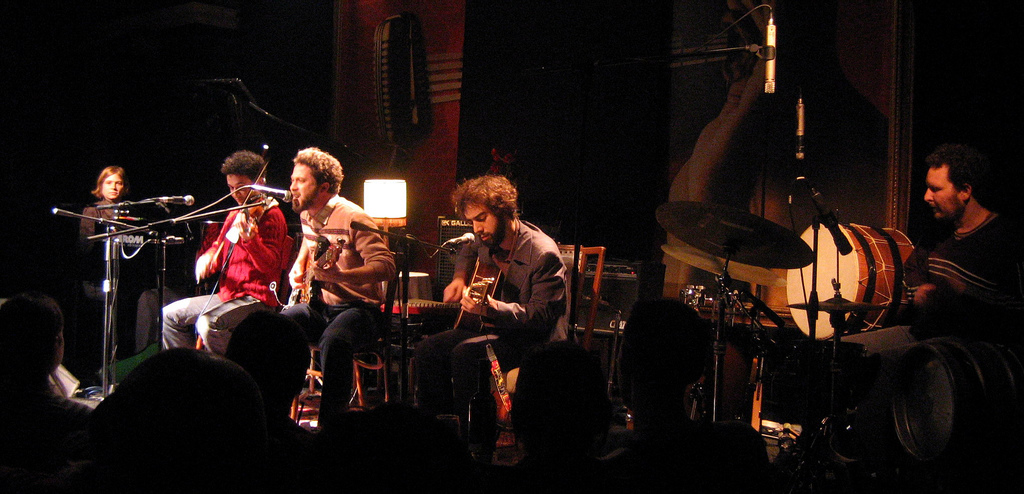
Habiluim performing at the Goldstar Zappa club in Tel Aviv, Israel, on Jan. 2, 2006. From left to right: Maya Dunietz, Yoni Silver, Noam Enbar, Yami Wisler, Shahar Haziza.

Habiluim (Hebrew: הבילויים; lit. The recreations / entertainments, also the name of members of the Bilu movement) is an Israeli, theatrical rock and polka band formed in 1996 by Noam Enbar (bass and vocals) and Yammi Wisler (electric guitar) as a reaction to the deep sense of abhorrence they felt listening to contemporary Israeli pop music, which they viewed as a means of escape from the harsh Israeli reality.

The band's songs are grotesque accounts of the Israeli life from a political, social and critical point of view. In their song "Shaul Mofaz" the former minister of defense (Shaul Mofaz) is riding a snow sledge from house to house, giving out amputated organs of dead soldiers to their bereaved families. "Etzot Me'Imma" (Motherly Advice) is a mother's recommendation to her daughter to have an abortion, so her life won't be ruined by the need to raise a child, like her mother's was when she was born.

The grim contents of the band's songs are often accompanied by lively dancing music, drawing from the klezmer sounds of the Jewish ghetto, combined with Russian and Balkan folk music, and inspired by composers such as Kurt Weill and Hanns Eisler.

In 2002 the band was joined by pianist Maya Dunietz, and the band was signed by a major Israeli label, NMC Music. Habiluim recorded their first album (self titled), produced by Berry Sakharof (Minimal Compact). The album won critical acclaim and commercial success. Soon afterwards the band was joined by Yoni Silver (violin, saxophones). Throughout the years, several drummers have joined the band, including Shlomi (Kruvi) Lavi and Shahar Haziza. The band also included scratcher DJ Ofer (Schoolmaster) Tal, accordionist Assaf Talmudi and brass player Eyal Talmudi.

In 2006 Habiluim recorded their second album "Bereavement and Failure" ("שכול וכישלון" shchol vekishalon), inspired by the novel of Yosef Haim Brenner by the same name. the album was recorded in New York City, produced by Tamir Muskat (Balkan Beat Box), and released in August 2007, also by NMC. The album enjoyed great critical and public acclaim. In an interview in October 2007, Enbar and Wisler characterized the album as a soundtrack to a fictional musical, transposing Brenner's novel into a contemporary setting.

== Discography ==
=== Now Be Our Slaves (1996) ===
| No. | Title | Length |
|---|---|---|
| 1. | "Ptikha" ((Intro) "פתיחה") | 00:36 |
| 2. | "Fantasia BeLama Lo" ((Fantasy at the Why Not) "פנטזיה בלמה לא") | 02:13 |
| 3. | "Kometz Sipurim" ((A Handful of Stories) "קומץ סיפורים") | 01:26 |
| 4. | "Kmo Ze'a" ((Like Sweat) "כמו זיעה") | 03:02 |
| 5. | "Ein Li Siba Lihiyot Male Tikva Ha'Erev" ((I Have No Reason to Be Hopeful Tonight) "אין לי סיבה להיות מלא תקווה הערב") | 04:14 |
| 6. | "Yafim VeYafot" ((Beautiful People) "יפים ויפות") | 04:48 |
| 7. | "Ish Ha'Ofanusim" ((The Ofanusim Man) "איש האופנוסים") | 02:40 |
| 8. | "HaKikar" ((The Roundabout) "הכיכר") | 03:43 |
| 9. | "Pepto Kam BaBoker" ((Pepto Woke Up One Morning) "פפטו קם בבוקר") | 02:32 |
| 10. | "Auschwitz Blues" ("אושוויץ בלוז") | 02:49 |
| 11. | "Baron HaAchbarim" ((Lord of Mice) "ברון העכברים") | 04:29 |
| Total length: | | 32:32 |

=== Habiluim (2003) ===
| No. | Title | Length |
|---|---|---|
| 1. | "Ani Meki" ((I'm Throwing Up) "אני מקיא") | 1:56 |
| 2. | "Kshe'Napolean Yikhbosh et Akko" ((Once Napoleon Conquers Akko) "כשנפוליאון יכבוש את עכו") | 4:39 |
| 3. | "Ma Shlom Hazaken Shel Chin Ku Chen" ((How's the Elder of Chin Ku Chen Doing?) "מה שלום הזקן של צ'ין קו צ'ן") | 4:17 |
| 4. | "Oto Zevel (Kach Oti Itcha)" ((Garbage Truck (Take Me With You)) "אוטו זבל (קח אותי אתך)") | 2:04 |
| 5. | "Merusia" ((From Russia "מרוסיה")) | 4:16 |
| 6. | "Mitbach El Yahud" ("מטבח אל יהוד") | 5:53 |
| 7. | "Leyad Beit Hashechi" ((By the Armpit) "ליד בית השחי") | 3:14 |
| 8. | "Ein Bagetim Bagetto" ((No Baguettes at the Ghetto) "אין בגטים בגטו") | 2:55 |
| 9. | "Shaul Mophaz" ("שאול מופז") | 4:03 |
| 10. | "Balada Le'em Khad Horit" ((Ballad for a Single Mother) "בלדה לאם חד הורית") | 5:39 |
| 11. | "Bachurim Shel Yeshiva" ((Yeshiva Men) "בחורים של ישיבה") | 3:01 |
| 12. | "Nifla Po" ((It's Wonderful in Here) "נפלא פה") | 5:42 |
| Total length: | | 46:55 |

=== Shchol Vekishalon (Bereavement and Failure) (2007) ===
| No. | Title | Length |
|---|---|---|
| 1. | "Bab El-Wad 38A" ("באב אל וואד 38/א") | 4:05 |
| 2. | "Hilik Porcelaina Mistakel Al Hamitz'ad" ((Hilik Porcelaina Is Watching the Parade) "חיליק פורצלינה מסתכל על המצעד") | 2:55 |
| 3. | "Shosh Almozlino (Haita Tzricha Lihiot Sgura Etzli Be'eizeh Kad)" ((Shosh Almozlino (Should Have Been Sealed Shut Inside My Vase)) "שוש אלמוזלינו (הייתה צריכה להיות סגורה אצלי באיזה כד)) | 3:39 |
| 4. | "Shegger Pegger" ("שגר פגר") | 3:28 |
| 5. | "Tinshav Haruach" ((The Wind Will Blow) "תנשב הרוח") | 3:33 |
| 6. | "Kalon In G7" ((Disgrace in G7) "קלון ב-G7") | 3:46 |
| 7. | "Etzot Me'ima" ((A Mother's Advice) "עצות מאמא") | 2:34 |
| 8. | "Shiro Shel Hanz" ((Hanz' Song) "שירו של האנץ") | 4:10 |
| 9. | "Arafel Hazayati" ((Hallucinatory Fog) "ערפל הזייתי") | 0:28 |
| 10. | "Shir Bechasut Hamoatza Leperot Hadar" ((A Song Sponsored by the Citrus Fruit Council) "שיר בחסות המועצה לפירות הדר") | 3:35 |
| 11. | "Mashehu Kmo Tea" ((Something Like Tea) "משהו כמו תה") | 5:58 |
| Total length: | | 38:11 |

=== Hora Haslama! (2013) (!הורה הסלמה) ===
| No. | Title | Length |
|---|---|---|
| 1. | "Nipagesh Al Hachof" ((Let Us Meet on the Shore) "ניפגש על החוף") | 2:27 |
| 2. | "Zemer Spaot" ((Spa Song) "זמר ספאות") | 3:20 |
| 3. | "Hatzeada" ((The March) "הצעדה") | 3:32 |
| 4. | "5 Hatzaot Lepitron Hasichsuch" ((5 Proposals That Might Solve the Conflict) "5 הצעות לפתרון הסכסוך") | 3:14 |
| 5. | "Hazman Ha'acharon" ((Lately) "הזמן האחרון") | 3:02 |
| 6. | "Hora Haslama!" ((Escalation Hora!) "הורה הסלמה!") | 3:32 |
| 7. | "Saneti Et Hadira Shelcha" ((I Hated Your Apartment) "שנאתי את הדירה שלך") | 3:15 |
| 8. | "Chayav Lehitargen" ((Must Get Ready) "חייב להתארגן") | 3:41 |
| 9. | "Yeled Nerot" ((Candle Child) "ילד נרות") | 1:02 |
| 10. | "Erev Erev" ((Evening After Evening) "ערב ערב") | 3:10 |
| 11. | "Shir Ha'aspest (Kmo Be'soos)" ((Burclover Song (Like a Horse)) "שיר האספסת (כמו בסוס)") | 4:26 |
| 12. | "Miss Tevel" ((Miss Earth) "מיס תבל") | 4:07 |
| 13. | "Ani Afrikai" ((I'm African) "אני אפריקאי") | 4:14 |
| 14. | "Tiur Shel Ma'avk (Moshe Batieyva)" ((Description of a Struggle (Pig in a Blanket)) "תיאור של מאבק (משה בתיבה)") | 5:06 |
| Total length: | | 48:08 |
