= Noam Enbar =

Israeli composer, singer and performance artist

Noam Enbar נועם ענבר
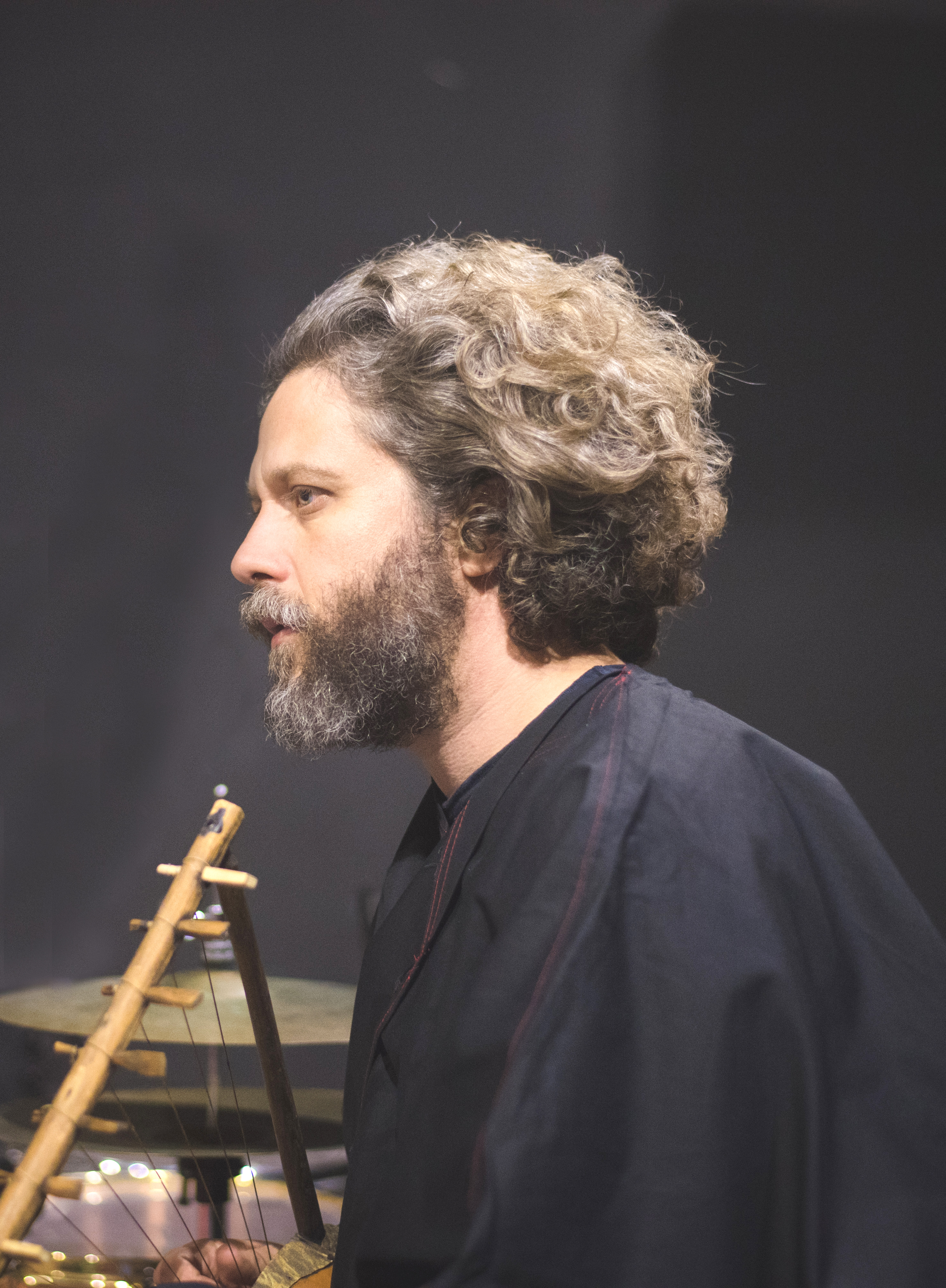

Background information
- Born: 1978 (age 47–48); Tel Aviv, Israel
- Occupations: Composer, singer, songwriter, performance artist
- Years active: 1996–present
- Member of: The Great Gehenna Choir, Ripples Collective
- Formerly of: Habiluim, Oy Division

Noam Enbar (Hebrew: נועם ענבר; born 1978) is an Israeli composer, singer, songwriter and performance artist. His work spans post-rock, new-folk, film and theatre music, choral music, sound installation and participatory performance. He co-founded the band Habiluim and the klezmer ensemble Oy Division, founded the Great Gehenna Choir, and is a co-founder of the Palestinian–Israeli Ripples Collective.

Enbar has composed music for films by director Avi Mograbi, including Z32 (2008), Once I Entered a Garden (2012) and Between Fences (2016), and has created theatre, performance and large-scale vocal works presented in Israel and internationally.

== Bands ==
=== Habiluim ===
In 1996, while still in high school, Enbar founded Habiluim with guitarist Yami Weissler. Enbar became the group's lead singer and bassist, and the two were its principal songwriters. The band's music combined post-rock with elements of cabaret, klezmer, Balkan music and theatrical music, while its lyrics frequently used satire and political and social criticism.

Habiluim released three studio albums: Habiluim (2003), Bereavement and Failure (שכול וכישלון, 2007) and Escalation Hora! (הורה הסלמה!, 2013). The group stopped regular activity in 2013 and reunited for performances beginning in 2021.

=== Oy Division ===
In 2006 Enbar joined a group of musicians who formed the klezmer ensemble Oy Division. He was a vocalist and percussionist in the group, which worked with Yiddish and Eastern European Jewish musical traditions.

In 2008 Oy Division collaborated with Daniel Kahn and Psoy Korolenko on the album The Unternationale: The First Unternational, recorded in Tel Aviv and performed in English, Russian and Yiddish.

== Film ==
Beginning in the late 2000s, Enbar developed an extended collaboration with documentary filmmaker Avi Mograbi. For Mograbi's Z32 (2008), a musical documentary centred on the testimony of an Israeli former soldier who had participated in a revenge operation, Enbar composed the music and co-wrote the screenplay. The film was presented at the Venice International Film Festival.

Enbar subsequently composed the soundtrack for Mograbi's Once I Entered a Garden (2012). He also composed the music for Between Fences (2016), which grew out of a theatre workshop conducted by Mograbi and theatre practitioner Chen Alon with Eritrean and Sudanese asylum seekers held at the Holot detention centre in southern Israel. The workshop used methods from Theatre of the Oppressed, developed by Brazilian theatre practitioner Augusto Boal, in which participants dramatize lived experience and social conflict. The film was presented in the Berlinale Forum in 2016.

Enbar's collaboration with Mograbi also extended into performance and installation. In 2012 Mograbi presented At the Back / The Details at Berlinale Forum Expanded; At the Back incorporated a live score by Enbar, Adam Scheflan, Ariel Armoni and Yoni Silver.

In 2017 Enbar presented Pana Ha'Geshem (The Rain Is Gone) at Berlinale Forum Expanded. The single-channel video installation grew out of the Between Fences project and centred on a structured vocal improvisation performed with participants from the Holot theatre workshop. It transformed an Israeli agricultural song associated with the kibbutz movement into a polyphonic chant.

== Theatre and stage work ==
Enbar has collaborated with playwright and director Yonatan Levy on works combining music, theatre, choral performance and ritual.

In 2014 Enbar and Levy created The General and the Sea. Menashe Noy portrayed former Israeli chief of staff Rafael Eitan (Raful) in a musical-theatre work imagining his final confrontation with the sea, embodied by a chorus of performers. Enbar composed the music and performed in the chorus.

Enbar later composed and performed the music for Nefilim (Giants), written by Levy and Boaz Lavie and directed by Levy. Premiered at the Israel Festival in 2016, the trilogy used figures including Menachem Begin, an Israeli judoka and Bar Refaeli to examine changing forms of Israeli national identity and mythology.

In 2016 Enbar and Levy created Antigone, a participatory work based on Sophocles' tragedy. Developed for Conditions of Political Choreography, a joint project of the Center for Contemporary Art, Tel Aviv and the Neuer Berliner Kunstverein, it was presented in Tel Aviv in 2016 and Berlin in 2017 and used collective actions and audience participation to reframe the dramatic conflict.

In 2026 Enbar again collaborated with Levy on Der Dybbuk at Tel Aviv University. Based on Joseph Lateiner's earlier Yiddish play rather than S. An-sky's better-known The Dybbuk, the production reconstructed a text from early-20th-century New York prompters' manuscripts. Adapted and directed by Levy as a five-act musical shtetl comedy in Yiddish and Hebrew, it featured music composed by Enbar, who also served as musical director with an ensemble from the Buchmann-Mehta School of Music.

== Performance art and the Great Gehenna Choir ==
From the early 2010s Enbar increasingly worked with vocal ensembles, participatory performance and contemporary forms of ritual. In Sleep Inducement (Hardama), first presented at the Israel Museum in 2012, audience members reclined while performers sang songs in several languages. In another work from this period, Psychomysticism!, Enbar combined psychedelic rock with Jewish cantorial traditions; the work was presented as part of the Jerusalem Season of Culture.

In 2015 Enbar founded the Great Gehenna Choir at Jerusalem's Mamuta Art and Research Center. The ensemble brought together singers from different backgrounds and developed performances combining composed polyphony, improvisation and participatory ritual. Its structure evolved toward collective decision-making and shared artistic responsibility.

In 2017 the Tel Aviv Museum of Art presented Enbar's Preaching to the Choir, a six-month cycle of live performances and participatory events centred on the human voice. The museum described the project as occupying a space between ritual theatre and ecstatic public singing, with the audience at times participating vocally in the works.

In 2018 Enbar created Blindsight with the Great Gehenna Choir, writer Yonatan Levy and dramaturg Nir Shauloff. Presented at Jerusalem's Mekudeshet festival in 2018 and again in 2019, the immersive work took place in the Jerusalem Forest. Audience members were blindfolded and led through the forest while voices, songs, instruments and environmental sounds surrounded them. A recorded version compiled from performances of the work was released in 2019.

In 2019 the Great Gehenna Choir presented Tikun Khazot at the Israel Festival. Built around David Avidan's poem of the same name, the work combined a cappella singing, movement and ritual imagery. A review in Ynet described the production as combining Hebrew poetry, Jewish and pagan imagery and the dynamics of a ceremonial gathering.

== Solo recordings ==
Enbar released The Phoenix (הפניקס) in 2023. The six-track recording featured music composed and arranged by Enbar, with most of the texts written by Yonatan Levy. The album was also the subject of a feature in Haaretz.

His second solo album, Aye Rukhi (איה רוחי), was released in 2025. It includes original songs and reinterpretations, with a strong emphasis on ensemble vocals. The title track is a Hebrew adaptation of the Pixies song "Where Is My Mind?", translated by Yonatan Levy and recorded with members of the Great Gehenna Choir.

== Ripples Collective ==
In 2024 Enbar became one of the co-founders of Ripples Collective, an interdisciplinary Palestinian–Israeli group of musicians, artists, activists and facilitators. The collective combines music, storytelling, movement and participatory processes in a performance format it describes as a "collective liberation ritual".

The group's first ritual-performance was created for Medicine Festival in the United Kingdom in 2024. In 2025 the Financial Times profiled the collective, focusing on its effort to sustain Palestinian–Israeli artistic collaboration during the Gaza war. Later that year the collective appeared at the Sheldonian Theatre in Oxford as part of Transform Trauma Oxford.

The collective continued to present work internationally in 2026, including a ritual-performance at the Sacré Sound Festival in Paris and a workshop at the International Conference on Psychedelic Research in the Netherlands.

== Discography ==
=== Solo ===
- The Phoenix (2023)
- Aye Rukhi (2025)

=== With Habiluim ===
- Habiluim (2003)
- Bereavement and Failure (2007)
- Escalation Hora! (2013)

=== With the Great Gehenna Choir ===
- Blindsight (2019)

=== With Oy Division ===
- Oy Division! (2008)
- The Unternationale: The First Unternational (with Daniel Kahn and Psoy Korolenko, 2008)

== See also ==
- Music of Israel
