= Hagada Hasmalit =

Israeli far-left website

- Screenshot Screenshot of home page on 4 April 2025
- Native name: הגדה השמאלית
- Available in: Hebrew
- Website: hagada.org.il

Hagada Hasmalit (Hebrew: הגדה השמאלית, "The Left Bank") was an Israel radical left-wing website. First published in Hebrew in Spring 2002, an English version began to be published in March 2007.

Hagada Hasmalit features articles and commentary by Jewish Israelis, Arab Israelis, and Palestinians from an anti-Zionist, Marxist or anarchist perspective. The magazine opposes continuing the Israeli presence in the Israeli-occupied territories, and critique social and economic issues inside Israel.

Hagada Hasmalit supported various campaigns over the years including the campaign to free Mordechai Vanunu, the struggle against the Israeli West Bank barrier in Bil'in, Tali Fahima and the refuseniks.

Hagada Hasmalit is also a club run by the Maki, the Israeli communist party, at 70 Ahad Ha'am Street, Tel Aviv. The Hagada club hosts jazz evenings, film showings, lectures and performances. Some of the members of the club launched the website.
