= Grundik+Slava =

Israeli electronic music duo

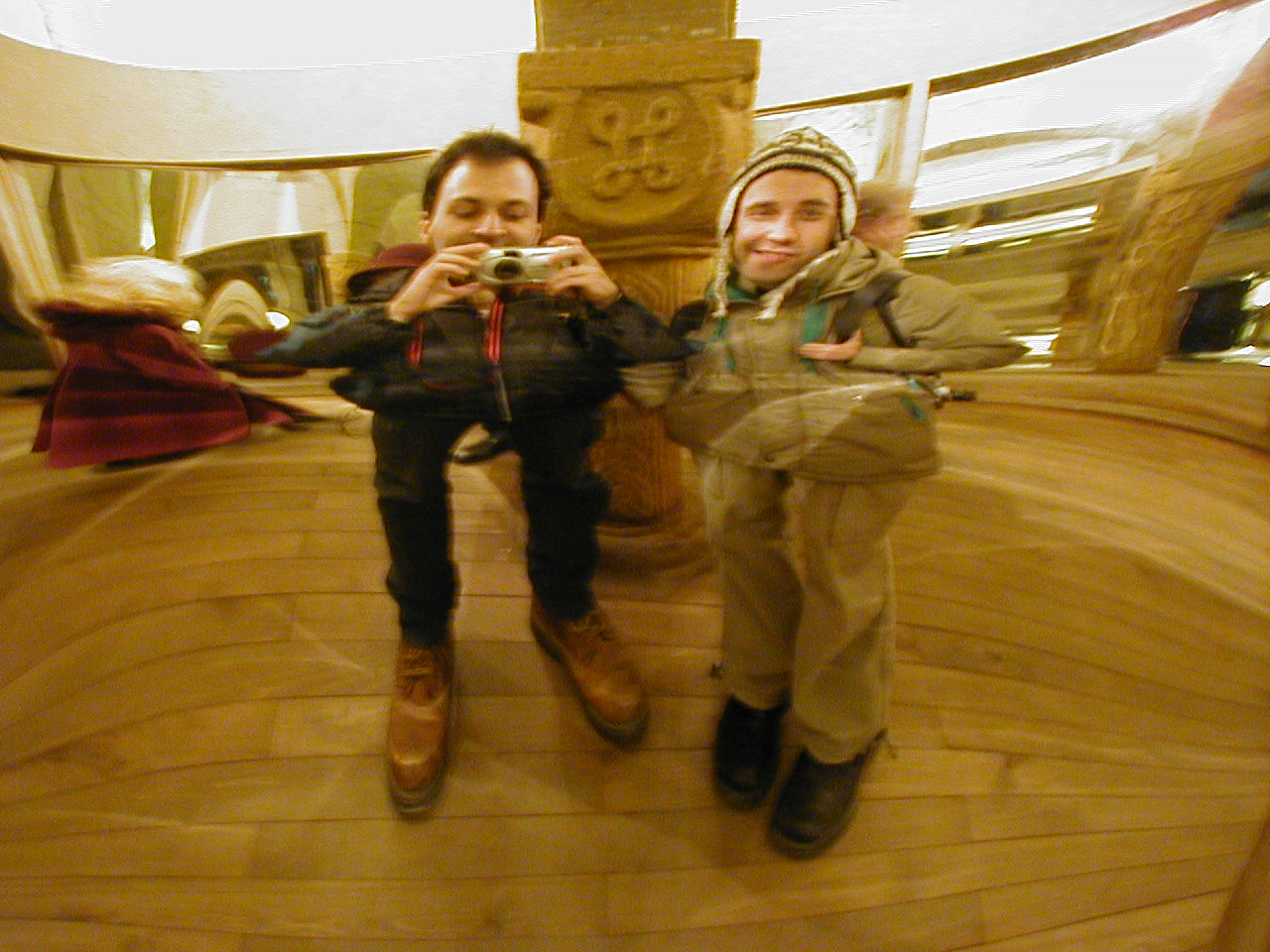

Background information
- Origin: Israel
- Genre: electronica
- Years active: 1994-present
- Labels: Kunstkamera, Rruido, Topheth Prophet, Auris Media, Stateart Records, Ak-Duck, Fact Records, Earsay Records
- Members: Grundik Kasyansky; Slava Smelovsky
- Website: https://smelovsky.com/?s=grundik%2Bslava

Experimental electronic duo Grundik+Slava is a collaboration between two electronic musicians and sound artists Grundik Kasyansky and Slava Smelovsky. The duo was active in Israel in late 90s-early 00s, and played an important role in the flourishing of the Tel-Aviv and Jerusalem art and music underground. They released 7 albums in Israel, Germany and Argentina. Grundik and Slava worked together with musicians Chaos as Shelter, Ambidextrous, Victoria Hanna, sculptor Avi Seton, multimedia artist Hagar Goran, video-artist Max Tigay. Duo composed music for several films, plays, installations, and multimedia projects.

== Selected discography ==
- XAPMC (2007, Rruido – RR 009, Argentina)
- Frogs (2005, Topheth Prophet – tp004, Auris Media – aum009)
- ...for electronics and birds (Stateart Records, 2004, #AVANT006)
- Split by Grundik+Slava/Ambidextrous (Ak-Duck and Fact Records, 2003, #FactDuck CD001)
- Album for the Young (Earsay records, 2001 #ES555)
- Polise (Earsay Records, 2000 #ES333)
- One Second before the Planet Blows up (Apocalyptic Album) (Fact Records, 1999 #FactCD004)
