= Off Festival =

Annual alternative music festival in Katowice, Poland

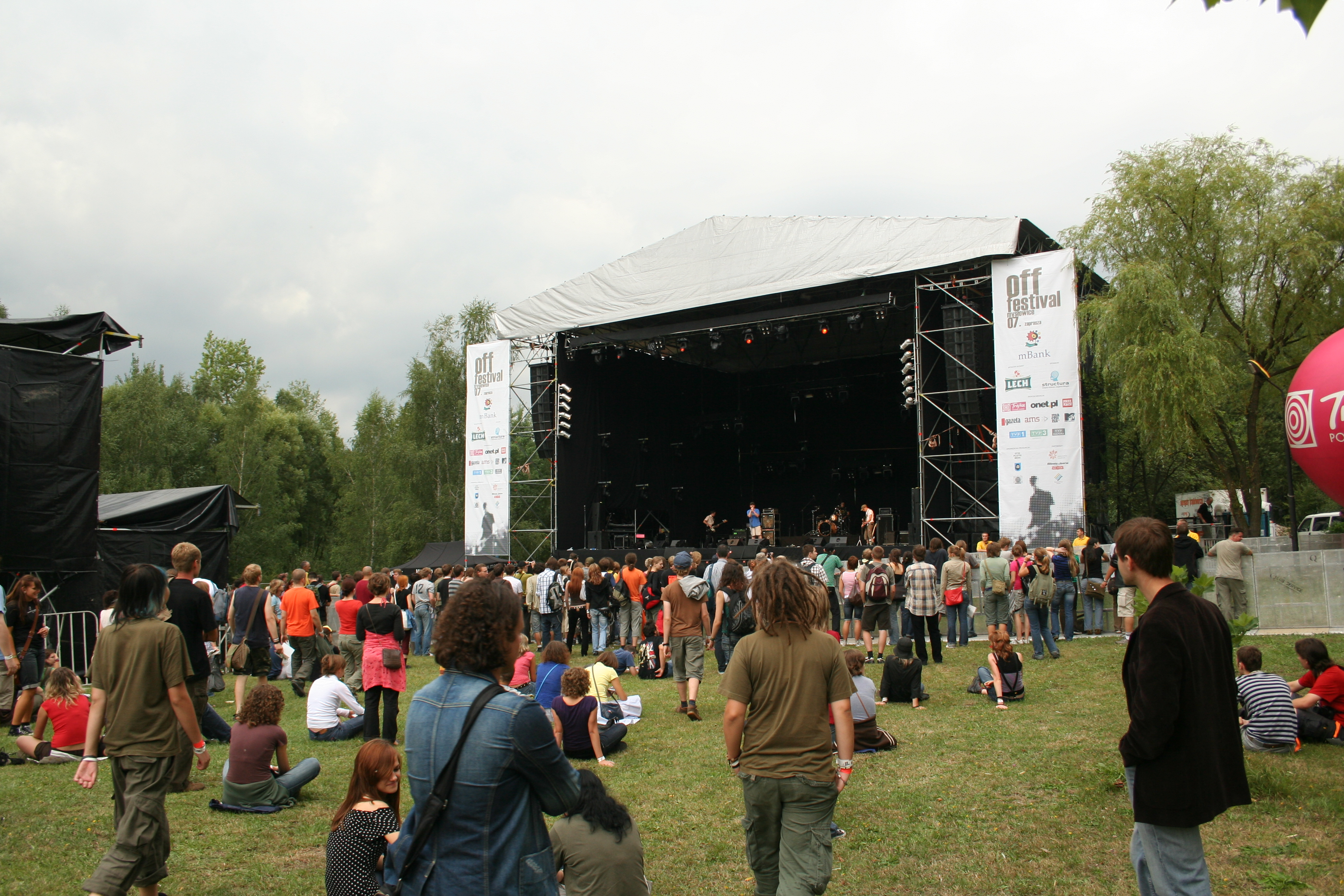
- OFF FESTIVAL Main Stage
- Genre: Alternative, rock, pop, folk, electronic, indie, punk, jazz
- Dates: August
- Locations: Katowice, Poland, previously in Mysłowice, Poland
- Years active: 2006–present
- Website: www.off-festival.pl

OFF Festival is an alternative music festival series held annually since 2006. Until 2009 it was held at Słupna Park in Mysłowice, Poland in August and lasts four days. OFF Festival from 2010 takes place in Katowice in Dolina Trzech Stawow.

The organizer and creative director of this festival is Artur Rojek, former leader of the bands Myslovitz and Lenny Valentino.

In addition to the music, the OFF Festival also support a variety of independent arts and culture events, like exhibitions, workshops and movie screenings. It is also connected with promotion of volunteer programs.

== History ==
The first edition of OFF Festival was held from 18–20 August 2006. About 11,000 people attended the three-day event with 30 bands performed on the 3 stages. OFF Festival 2009 was dedicated to the 70th anniversary of the outbreak of World War II. The guest of honour was Sub Pop boss Jonathan Poneman. The 2010 edition of Off Festival was held from 5 to 8 August in Katowice. Festival was dedicated to the celebration of 200th birthday of Fryderyk Chopin and filled with concerts with the main theme being 'Inspired by Chopin'.

== Venues ==
Most of the concerts of the first four editions of the festival were held in the area of Słupna watering place, but also in Evangelical Church, Local Culture Centre and many other places in the centre of Mysłowice.

In 2009 there were five stages: Main Stage, Forest, Experimental, "Trójka Offensywa" and "Miasto Muzyki".

From 2010 the festival is held in Dolina Trzech Stawów in Katowice.

== OFF Festival Club ==
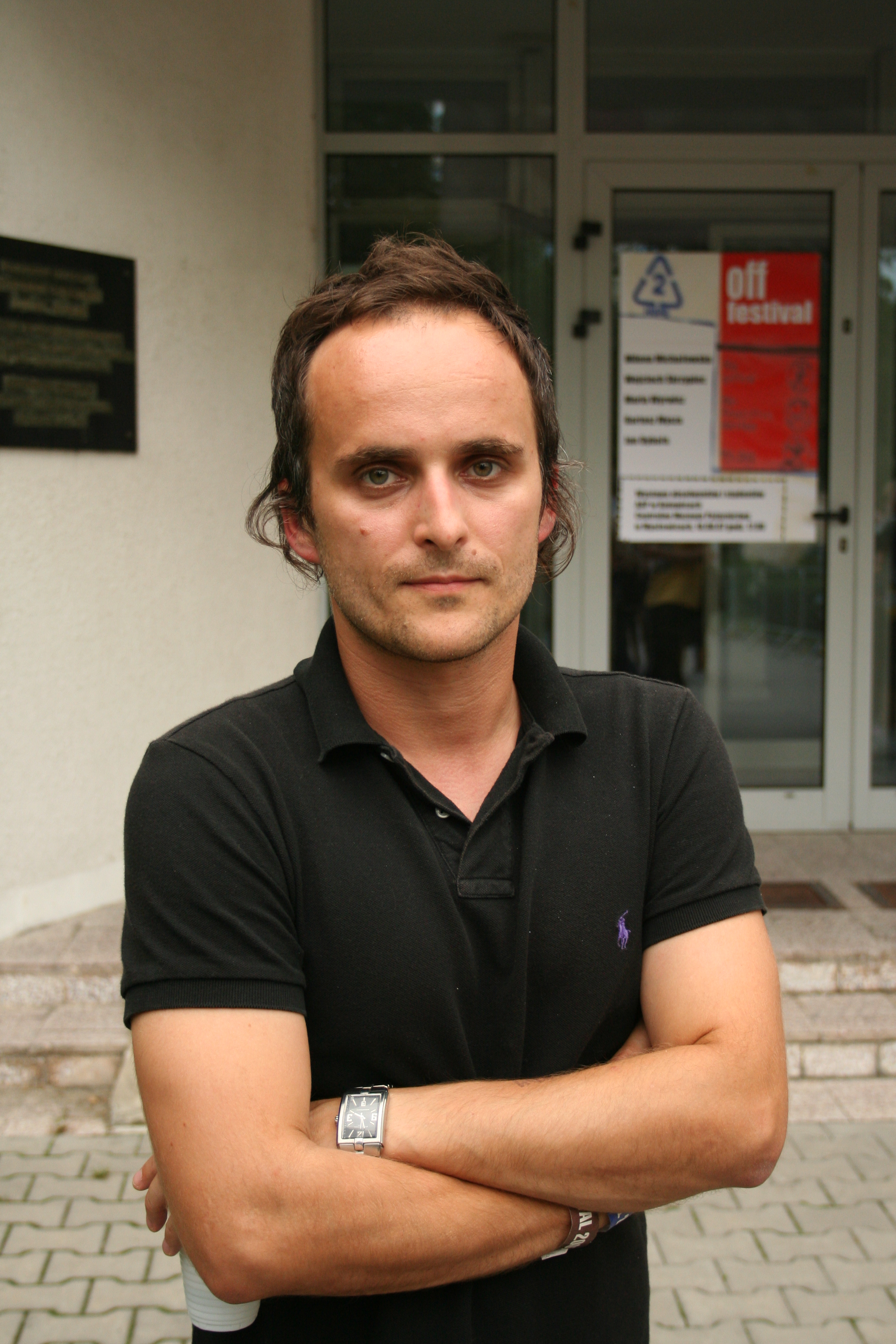
Artur Rojek as the art director

It is a series of club concerts started in 2008 by OFF Festival.

I edition

- 18 December 2008 – Katowice

Deerhoof, Contemporary Noise Sextet, Emiter, Kristen

II edition

- 19 April 2009 – Wrocław

Butthole Surfers, Materac, Plum

III edition

- 17 December 2009 – Warsaw

Monotonix, Mitch and Mitch with Igor Krutogolov play Zelig Rabitchnyak, Bajzel

- 18 December 2009 – Katowice

Monotonix, Mitch and Mitch with Igor Krutogolov play Zelig Rabitchnyak, Bajzel

IV edition

- 24 March 2010 – Kraków

Mount Eerie, Chain and The Gang, No Kids

- 2 December 2010 – Katowice at Jazz Club Hipnoza

Scout Niblett, Cieślak i Księżniczki, Ed Wood

V edition

- 16 April 2011 – Katowice

Merzbow, Zs, Kid606, Niwea
