= Moisei Beregovsky =

Soviet Jewish folklorist and ethnomusicologist (1892–1961)

Moisei Iakovlevich Beregovsky
- Моисей Яковлевич Береговский
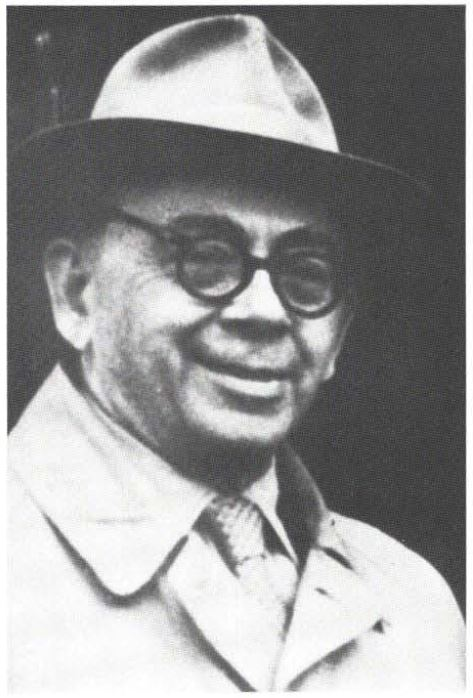
- Born: 1892; Termakhivka, Kiev Governorate, Russian Empire (present-day Ukraine)
- Died: 12 August 1961 (aged 68–69); Kyiv, Ukrainian SSR, Soviet Union (present-day Kyiv, Ukraine)
- Other name: Moyshe Aron Beregovski
- Occupations: Folklorist, ethnomusicologist, music teacher

Moisei Beregovsky (1892 – 12 August 1961, Russian: Моисей Яковлевич Береговский, romanized: Moisey Yakovlevich Beregovsky; Yiddish: משה אהרן בערעגאָװסקי, romanized: Moyshe Aron Beregovski) was a Soviet Jewish folklorist, musicologist and ethnomusicologist from the Ukrainian SSR who was a key figure in the study of Jewish music. He collected, studied and published about klezmer music, Yiddish song, wordless nigun melodies, and the music of Purim plays. His published collections, mostly only released after his death, remain important sources of Jewish music from the late Russian Empire and early Soviet period. Most of his research was done during the period of 1927–1949, during the Stalin era, during which he was faced not only with ideological restrictions, but a period of imprisonment in a forced labour camp from 1950 to 1955. He was rehabilitated after 1955 and continued his work in his final years during the Khrushchev-era.

== Biography ==
=== Early life ===
Beregovsky was born in 1892 in Termakhivka hamlet, Radomyshl district, Kiev Governorate in the Russian Empire (today in Kyiv Oblast, Ukraine). Conflicting dates exist for his exact birth date, which is often given as December 28. His father Yankel Volfovich Beregovsky was a melamed (a teacher in a Jewish parochial primary school or Cheder) and possibly a music teacher as well; his mother was called Sosya Seysokhovna. While he was still an infant, the family was forced by antisemitic legislation to relocate to Makarov. As a child he received a traditional education in a Cheder, studied in a Jewish reformed school and had Russian tutors as well; he also participated as a boy-chorister in a local synagogue. In 1905, at age 13, he was sent to Kyiv and studied in Gymnasiums there until 1912. Starting in 1915, he studied composition with the musicologist Boryslav Yavorsky and cello in the Kyiv Conservatory until 1920; during this time he founded and led the music division of the Jewish Culture League (Kultur Lige) and became involved in performance, choir directing and music education. In 1917 he was also recruited to work with the team categorizing the Jewish music collected by S. An-sky and Susman Kiselgof on their 1912 ethnographic expedition. The Kultur Lige closed in 1920, and in 1922 he relocated to Petrograd and enrolled in the Petrograd Conservatory, where he studied composition until 1924 but did not complete his studies. He worked in a Jewish orphanage in Petrograd where he met his wife Sarah Paz. They moved to Malakhovka, Moscow Oblast in 1924, where he worked at a Jewish children's colony. They moved again to Kyiv in 1926, where he resumed teaching at the music school he had founded a few years earlier. In 1927 he studied under Klyment Kvitka on folklore collection methodology at the All-Ukrainian Academy of Sciences (AUAS; Ukrainian: Всеукраїнська академія наук); Kvitka would remain an important influence.

=== Career in music research ===
Not long after returning to Kyiv, he helped establish a Commission for Jewish Folk Music Research at the AUAS. By 1928 he was doing music research full-time in the Commission for Jewish Folk Music Studies at the AUAS, which had been newly reorganized from the Music Ethnography Bureau, and in 1929 Beregovsky started making field expeditions to record folk music in Soviet Ukraine. In around 1929 he became head of the Musical Folklore section of the newly established Institute for Jewish Proletarian Culture (Russian: Институт еврейской пролетарской культуры), which was also based at the AUAS. At its height in 1934 this institute had a staff of 70. A phonograph archive was founded at the Institute, which took in field recordings made decades earlier by Joel Engel and Susman Kiselgof. Through the institute, Beregovsky published the first of his planned five collections of Jewish music, which he had been preparing since 1930, in 1934. There were meant to be five volumes, but this first volume Yidisher muzik-folklor would be the only one published during his lifetime.

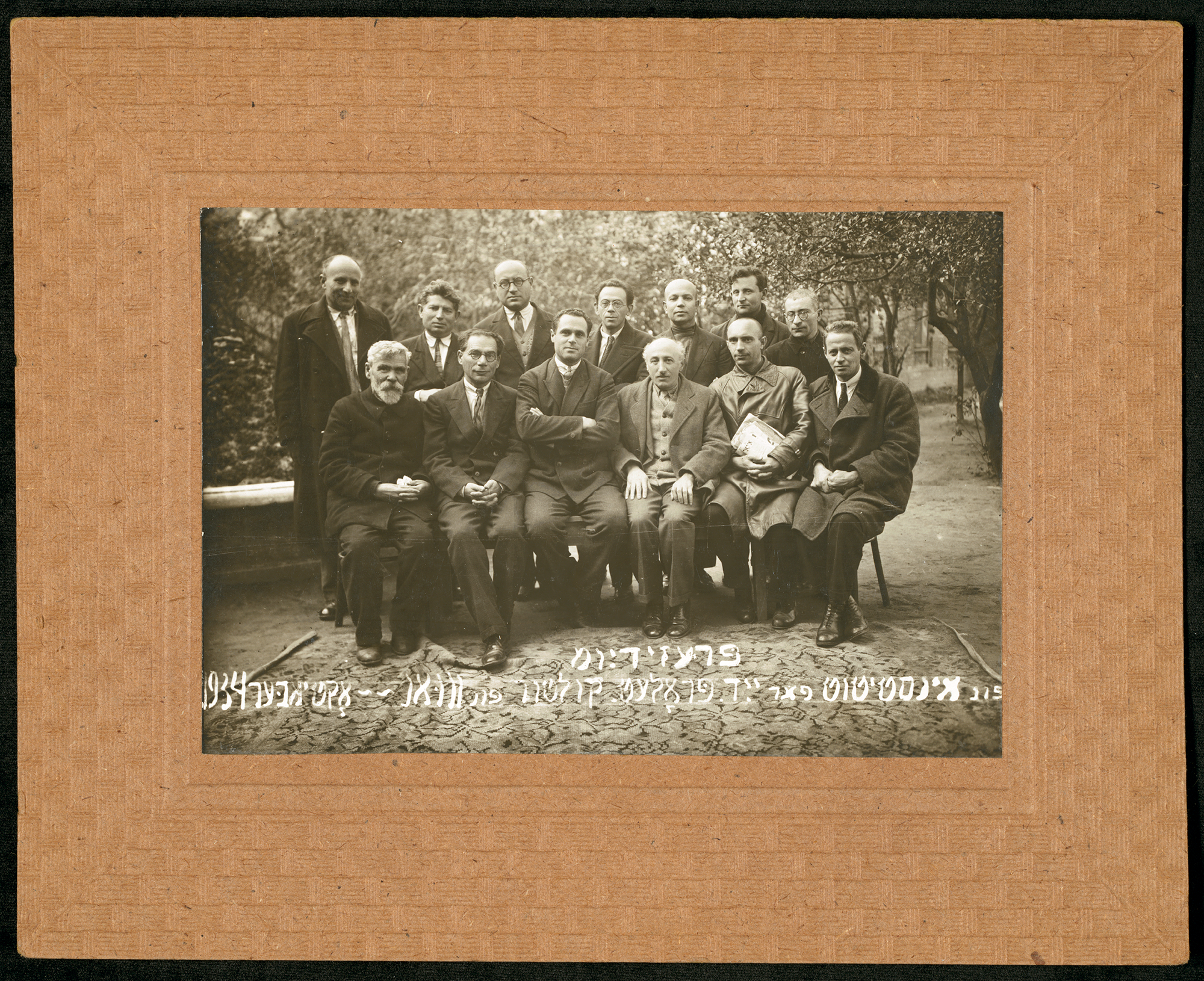
Members of the Presidium of the Institute of Jewish Proletarian Culture of the Ukrainian Academy of Sciences, October 1934. Beregovsky is in the back row standing in the middle.

In 1936, the Institute for Jewish Proletarian Culture was closed during the Stalinist purges and many of its employees were imprisoned; some were accused of Trotskyism. Beregovsky was spared and he became a researcher in the smaller successor organization, the Bureau for Research on Jewish Language, Literature and Folklore, as well as head of the Office of Folklore of the Jewish Arts Section of the AUAS, and head of the Office for Musical Ethnography. He also taught music theory and folklore at the Kyiv Conservatory from 1937 onwards, and became head of the Jewish section of the Composer's Union in 1938. In 1938 he published a collection of Jewish folksongs and composed Soviet Yiddish songs with the poet Itzik Feffer titled Yidishe folkslider.

He continued to make ethnographic expeditions during this period. His works make up the largest and most carefully notated collection of its kind in pre-WWII and early postwar Europe. He was especially interested in Klezmer music, which had been far less collected and studied than Yiddish folksong. By 1941 he said he collected roughly 700 examples of the genre, which included his own field recordings, musical manuscripts, and collections he inherited from Kiselgof. He also collected revolutionary songs in Yiddish, many which came from the pre-Soviet period. Due to the ideological framework of the institutions he was working in, he mostly avoided studying religious aspects of Jewish music, focusing on folklore, instrumental dances and the aforementioned revolutionary songs, as well as the interactions between Jewish and non-Jewish folk music. His writings often contained the type of polemics typical of academic works produced in the Stalin era; he often accused Russian Empire and American Jewish musicologists of "petty bourgeois reactionary" attitudes and attacked the basis of their conclusions. Most of his academic studies of this material were published in Russian, though some were published in Yiddish as well. Many of his academic writings from this era remain unpublished. Overall Beregovsky made roughly 2,000 field recordings on 700 phonograph cylinders. He also collected music manuscripts and other sources; the total amount of items in his collection may have been closer to seven thousand.

Following the Nazi invasion of Russia in 1941, Beregovsky and many academics from the AUAS were evacuated to Ufa in the Bashkir Autonomous Soviet Socialist Republic. During his time there he researched Bashkir music as well as the music of Ukrainians who had migrated there decades earlier. He and his colleagues returned to Kyiv in the summer of 1944. In 1944, Beregovsky received his Ph.D. from the Moscow Conservatory, writing his dissertation on the topic of Jewish instrumental folk music. He also resumed teaching at the Kyiv Conservatory in 1947. But, in the midst of official repression of Jewish culture and artists, he was dismissed from his position there in 1949 and the Bureau for Jewish Language, Literature and Folklore was shut down. Beregovsky then took up a more humble position at a music school teaching theory and choral singing.

=== Arrest, deportation, and final years ===
On 18 August 1950 Beregovsky was arrested and accused of nationalist activity. On 7 February 1951 he was found guilty and sentenced to ten years of forced labour for anti-Soviet propaganda, agitation, and participation in a counterrevolutionary organization (the Kultur Lige). He was deported to the Ozerlag camp in the Irkutsk region. He was paroled in March 1955 due to poor health and returned to Kyiv, where he resumed his work with music manuscripts. He petitioned to be rehabilitated, which was approved in June 1956 with the support of important figures like Dmitri Shostakovich. He tried unsuccessfully to publish some of his as-of-yet unreleased works and prepared his archive to be sent to the Institute for Theatre, Music and Cinematography in Leningrad (today the Russian Institute for the History of Arts; Russian: Российский институт истории искусств).

During his final months in hospital, the Canadian-American Yiddish song collector and folklorist Ruth Rubin travelled to the USSR and attempted to meet Beregovsky. He was too ill to see her but dictated a letter to his wife to deliver to her. He died of lung cancer on 12 August 1961.

== Legacy ==
Beregovsky's work should be viewed not only in the context of his fellow Soviet Jewish researchers like Kiselgof and Sofia Magid, but also in the longer tradition of such Eastern European Jewish musicologists and ethnographers such as Abraham Zevi Idelsohn, Joel Engel, S. An-sky, and Y.L. Cahan, of whom Beregovsky was often harshly critical. His collected materials and writings about Jewish folk music, analyzed with greater rigour than his predecessors, are invaluable and brought these genres to the attention of the wider world of ethnomusicology. Unfortunately as a result of Stalinist policy his research was repressed during his lifetime, and shifting priorities in later eras meant that it was largely neglected, although not as completely as the work of some of his contemporaries. Beregovsky's Jewish Folk Songs was published by a Moscow publisher Soviet Composer in 1962, and much later in 1987 it published Jewish Instrumental Folk Music, edited by Max Goldin. A selection of his work, including folk songs, klezmer music and essays, was translated into English and published by Mark Slobin as Old Jewish Folk Music in 1982.

Beregovsky's archive of wax cylinders, many from the pre-WWI Jewish Ethnographic Expedition directed by S. An-sky, was thought by many to have been destroyed during World War II, but was found to be in the Vernadsky National Library of Ukraine in Kyiv in the 1990s. Some of Beregovsky's most significant work and collections have been published in English by American ethnomusicologist Mark Slobin, beginning in 1982 with Old Jewish Folk Music (University of Pennsylvania Press), followed by a more expansive volume in 2001 devoted to Beregovsky's study of the klezmer instrumental tradition, Jewish Instrumental Folk Music (Syracuse Univ Press), translated by Michael Alpert and Slobin, annotated by Alpert, and edited by Slobin, Robert Rothstein and Alpert. The latter has been reissued in a 2015 second edition, extensively revised by Kurt Bjorling with annotations by Bjorling and Alpert, including the restoration of an entire chapter of text missing in the 2001 edition. Beregovsky's collections of melodies have made their way into the repertoire of many current-day klezmer musicians, including recordings by Joel Rubin, Joshua Horowitz, Alicia Svigals, Pete Rushefsky, Brave Old World, and Veretski Pass. Anna Shternshis of the University of Toronto and Russian-American scholar/avant-bard Psoy Korolenko worked with Beregovsky's archive of song texts, with Shternshis spearheading the production of the 2018 album Yiddish Glory (61st Grammy-nominated).

== Works (published) ==
- Jewish Musical Folklore (in Yiddish and Russian), USSR, 1934
- Jewish folksongs (in Yiddish) (in collaboration with Itzik Feffer), Kyiv, 1938
- Jewish Instrumental Folk Music (in Russian) (edited by Max Goldin, translation and transliteration by Velvl Chernin), "Muzyka" Publishing, Moscow, 1987
- Jewish wordless tunes (in Russian), "Kompozitor" Publishing, Russia, 1999
- Jewish Instrumental Folk Music (edited by Mark Slobin, Robert Rothstein, Michael Alpert) Syracuse University Press, 2001
- Purimshpils (in Russian ) (compiled by E. Beregovska), "Dukh i litera" Publishing, Kyiv, 2001
- Jewish Instrumental Folk Music, Second Edition (edited by Mark Slobin, Robert Rothstein, Michael Alpert, revised by Kurt Bjorling and Michael Alpert) www.muziker.org musical services, Evanston IL USA, 2015

== Recordings ==
- Beregovsky’s Wedding, CD (by Joel Rubin’s ensemble), Schott Wergo Publishing, Germany, 1997
- Midnight Prayer, CD (by Joel Rubin’s ensemble), Traditional Crossroads, New York City, 2007
- Beregovski Suite, CD (by Alicia Svigals & Uli Geissendoerfer), Vegas Records, New York, 2018
- Yiddish Glory, Six Degrees Records, 2018
