= Daniel Rosenberg =

Canadian journalist and record producer

Daniel Rosenberg is a Canadian journalist and record producer.

== Early life ==
Dan Rosenberg was born in Boston, Massachusetts, and grew up in Pittsburgh, Pennsylvania. From 1985 to 1988, he attended the University of Michigan, where he studied molecular biology and political science, and for some time he worked at a biotech software company.

== Journalism ==
In 1995, Rosenberg launched the radio program, Cafe International on WCBN-FM (Ann Arbor, Michigan|Ann Arbor) and WDTR-FM (Detroit, Michigan). The show, which was a "world music-interview" program, featured all-star guests, including Babatunde Olatunji, Khaled, Ali Farka Toure, Baaba Maal, Ravi Shankar, The Klezmatics, Leonard Nimoy, Caetano Veloso, Susana Baca, Ladysmith Black Mambazo, Thomas Mapfumo, Capercaillie, Andy Palacio, Olodum, Carlinhos Brown and scores of others.

In the 1990s, Rosenberg began traveling extensively, covering music from virtually every part of the world. His reports have appeared in The Rough Guides, The Times (UK), fRoots magazine, Islands magazine, NPR's Artbeat, PRI's Afropop Worldwide, and CBC Radio's Global Village.

== Record producer ==
Rosenberg writes that after hosting Cafe International for five years, he became frustrated that so much of the music on the program was almost impossible to find at local record shops, so he approached several record companies to release the folk music he covered as a journalist. Rosenberg has produced and written liner notes for more than 60 CDs, including the Grammy-nominated Yiddish Glory: The Lost Songs of World War II, The Hidden Gate: Jewish Music From Around the World (2-CD set, Rounder Records), and Musica Negra in the Americas: A 2CD anthology of African music in the Americas (Network Medien, Germany). His other compilations include OXFAM's Think Global Christmas and more than 40 compilations for The Rough Guide to World Music series. His most critically acclaimed collections include Rough Guide to the Music of Russia and Rough Guide to the Music of Central America.

== Personal ==
Rosenberg is married to Anna Shternshis and lives in Toronto, Ontario, Canada.
