= 200-metre individual medley =

Competitive swimming event

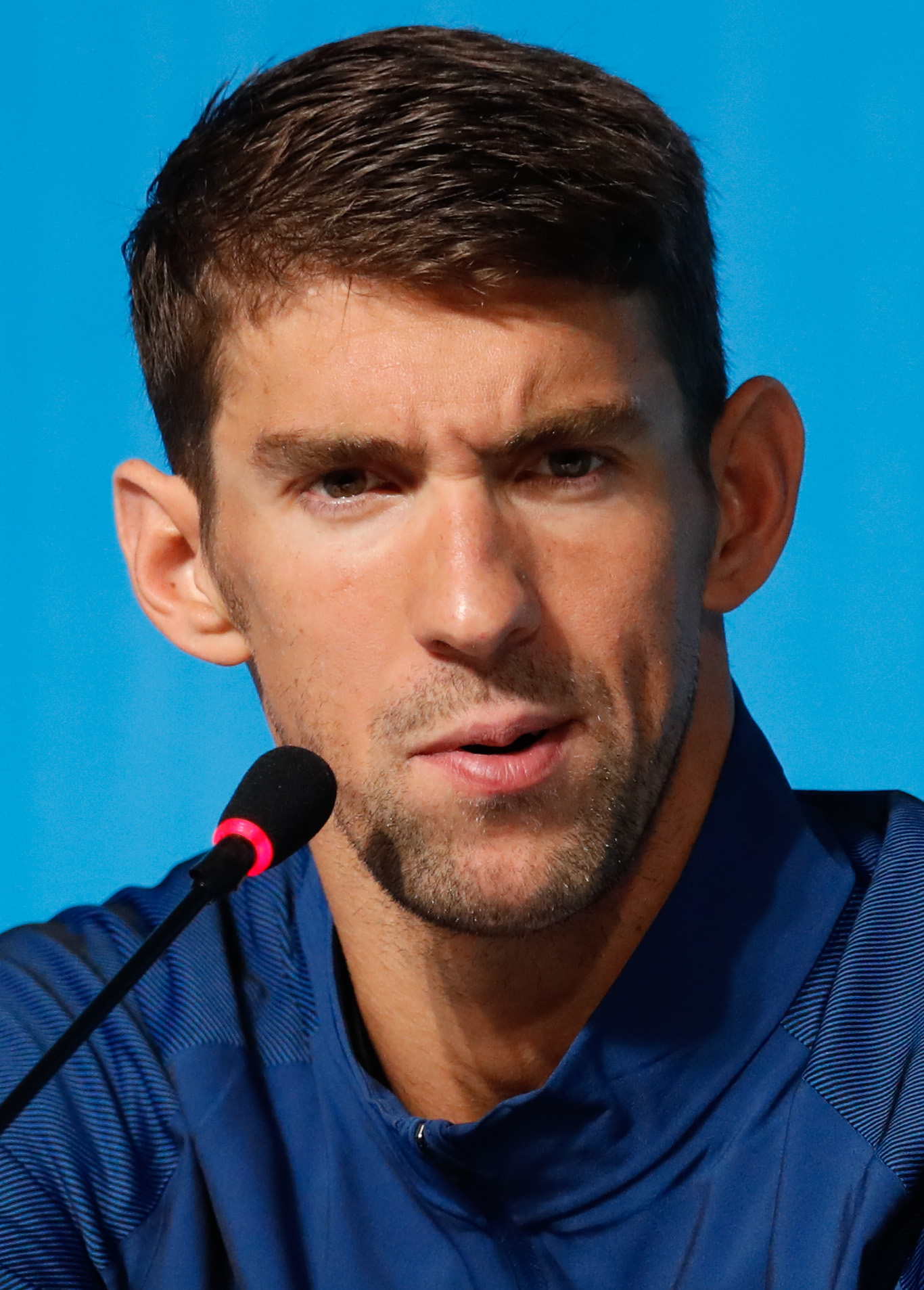
Michael Phelps, four-time Olympic gold medalist in the event.

The 200-metre individual medley is a race in competitive swimming in which swimmers compete in all four strokes (butterfly, backstroke, breaststroke, and freestyle) in one race, with each leg being 50 metres in length. The stroke order is different to the team variant of this race. US swimmer Michael Phelps is famous for his four-peat at the Olympics, winning the event at each Olympic Games from 2004 to 2016, the first swimmer to have ever won four successive gold medals at the same event. The world record for both SCM and LCM is currently held by Leon Marchand.

== Description ==
Swimmers start by diving off the block and swimming 50 metres of the butterfly stroke before touching the wall with both hands and turning into 50 metres of backstroke. There are three different ways you can turn on the wall in the backstroke-to-breaststroke transition. The most common is a one-handed touch to the wall and simply rotating your body to push off. The second possible turn is a cross overturn. This is when the swimmer touches the wall on their side and then flipping their legs over their head. The third possible turn is a bucket turn where, after you touch the wall, you do a backflip, similar to the cross-over turn but on your back. After the turn, the swimmer completes 50 metres of breaststroke. They finish the race with 50 metres of freestyle.

== All-time top 25 ==
Tables show data for two definitions of "Top 25" - the top 25 200 m individual medley times and the top 25 athletes:
- denotes top performance for athletes in the top 25 200 m individual medley times
- denotes lesser performances, still in the top 25 200 m individual medley times, by repeat athletes
- denotes top performance (only) for other top 25 athletes who fall outside the top 25 200 m individual medley times

=== Men long course ===
- Correct as of September 2026

Ath.#	Perf.#	Time	Athlete	Nation	Date	Place	Ref.
1	1	1:52.69	Léon Marchand	France	30 July 2025	Singapore	
	2	1:53.68	Marchand #2		31 July 2025	Singapore	
2	3	1:54.00	Ryan Lochte	United States	28 July 2011	Shanghai	
	4	1:54.06	Marchand #3		2 August 2024	Paris	
	5	1:54.10	Lochte #2		30 July 2009	Rome	
3	6	1:54.16	Michael Phelps	United States	28 July 2011	Shanghai	
	7	1:54.23	Phelps #2		15 August 2008	Beijing	
4	8	1:54.24	Hubert Kós	Hungary	16 August 2026	Paris	
	9	1:54.27	Phelps #3		2 August 2012	London	
5	10	1:54.30	Shaine Casas	United States	31 July 2025	Singapore	
	11	1:54.43	Lochte #3		21 August 2010	Irvine	
6	12	1:54.44	Hugo González	Spain	16 August 2026	Paris	
	13	1:54.56	Lochte #4		10 July 2009	Indianapolis	
7	14	1:54.62	Wang Shun	China	24 September 2023	Hangzhou	
	15	1:54.66	Phelps #4		11 August 2016	Rio de Janeiro	
	16	1:54.75	Phelps #5		9 August 2015	San Antonio	
	17	1:54.80	Phelps #6		4 July 2008	Omaha	
	18	1:54.82	Marchand #4		27 July 2023	Fukuoka	
	19	1:54.84	Lochte #5		6 August 2010	Irvine	
	19	1:54.84	Phelps #7		30 June 2012	Omaha	
	21	1:54.90	Lochte #6		2 August 2012	London	
	22	1:54.93	Lochte #7		30 June 2012	Omaha	
	23	1:54.98	Phelps #8		29 March 2007	Melbourne	
	23	1:54.98	Lochte #8		1 August 2013	Barcelona	
	25	1:55.00	Wang #2		30 July 2021	Tokyo	
8		1:55.07	Kosuke Hagino	Japan	9 April 2016	Tokyo	
9		1:55.18	László Cseh	Hungary	29 July 2009	Rome	
10		1:55.26	Michael Andrew	United States	17 June 2021	Omaha	
11		1:55.28	Duncan Scott	Great Britain	30 July 2021	Tokyo	
12		1:55.30	Tomoyuki Matsushita	Japan	20 September 2026	Tokyo	
13		1:55.36	Eric Shanteau	United States	30 July 2009	Rome	
13		1:55.36	Yumeki Kojima	Japan	20 September 2026	Tokyo	
15		1:55.40	Chase Kalisz	United States	11 August 2018	Tokyo	
16		1:55.55	Thiago Pereira	Brazil	30 July 2009	Rome	
16		1:55.55	Daiya Seto	Japan	18 January 2020	Beijing	
18		1:55.65	Carson Foster	United States	21 June 2024	Indianapolis	
19		1:55.72	Mitch Larkin	Australia	12 June 2019	Brisbane	
20		1:55.76	Philip Heintz	Germany	16 June 2017	Berlin	
21		1:55.85	Kosuke Makino	Japan	14 September 2025	Kusatsu	
22		1:56.07	Tom Dean	Great Britain	27 July 2023	Fukuoka	
22		1:56.07	Finlay Knox	Canada	18 May 2024	Toronto	
24		1:56.16	Mikhail Shcherbakov	Russia	16 August 2026	Paris	
25		1:56.17	Jérémy Desplanches	Switzerland	30 July 2021	Tokyo	

=== Men short course ===
- Correct as of October 2026

Ath.#	Perf.#	Time	Athlete	Nation	Date	Place	Ref.
1	1	1:48.88	Léon Marchand	France	1 November 2024	Singapore	
2	2	1:49.43	Shaine Casas	United States	11 October 2025	Carmel	
	3	1:49.51	Casas #2		10 December 2024	Budapest	
3	4	1:49.63	Ryan Lochte	United States	14 December 2012	Istanbul	
4	5	1:49.70	Maximus Williamson	United States	31 October 2026	Westmont	
	6	1:49.73	Marchand #2		11 October 2025	Carmel	
	7	1:50.08	Lochte #2		17 December 2010	Dubai	
	7	1:50.08	Casas #3		18 October 2025	Westmont	
5	9	1:50.15	Matthew Sates	South Africa	13 December 2022	Melbourne	
	10	1:50.30	Marchand #3		19 October 2024	Shanghai	
	11	1:50.37	Casas #4		19 October 2022	Toronto	
6	12	1:50.42	Tomoyuki Matsushita	Japan	12 October 2026	Saga	
7	13	1:50.47	Kosuke Hagino	Japan	5 December 2014	Doha	
8	14	1:50.59	Destin Lasco	United States	31 October 2026	Westmont	
9	15	1:50.66	Daiya Seto	Japan	29 October 2021	Kazan	
	16	1:50.76	Seto #2		21 December 2019	Las Vegas	
10	17	1:50.85	Andreas Vazaios	Greece	6 December 2019	Glasgow	
11	18	1:50.88	Alberto Razzetti	Italy	10 December 2024	Budapest	
12	19	1:50.90	Finlay Knox	Canada	10 December 2024	Budapest	
	20	1:50.91	Marchand #4		25 October 2024	Incheon	
13	21	1:50.96	Carson Foster	United States	13 December 2022	Melbourne	
14	22	1:50.98	Duncan Scott	Great Britain	8 December 2023	Otopeni	
15	23	1:51.01	Wang Shun	China	11 December 2018	Hangzhou	
	24	1:51.04	Knox #2		13 December 2022	Melbourne	
	25	1:51.08	Scott #2		19 October 2024	Shanghai	
16		1:51.14	Caeleb Dressel	United States	11 September 2021	Naples	
17		1:51.34	Luke Barr	United States	2 October 2026	Baku	
18		1:51.36	László Cseh	Hungary	4 December 2015	Netanya	
19		1:51.39	Hugo González	Spain	6 December 2025	Lublin	
20		1:51.53	Andrew Seliskar	United States	21 November 2020	Budapest	
21		1:51.55	Darian Townsend	South Africa	15 November 2009	Berlin	
22		1:51.56	Chad le Clos	South Africa	1 September 2014	Dubai	
23		1:51.72	Markus Rogan	Austria	10 December 2009	Istanbul	
24		1:51.74	Tomoe Hvas	Norway	6 December 2019	Glasgow	
25		1:51.78	Noè Ponti	Switzerland	19 October 2024	Shanghai	

=== Women long course ===
- Correct as of September 2026

Ath.#	Perf.#	Time	Athlete	Nation	Date	Place	Ref.
1	1	2:05.70	Summer McIntosh	Canada	9 June 2025	Victoria	
2	2	2:06.10	Yu Zidi	China	21 September 2026	Tokyo	
3	3	2:06.12	Katinka Hosszú	Hungary	3 August 2015	Kazan	
4	4	2:06.15	Ariana Kukors	United States	27 July 2009	Rome	
	5	2:06.56	McIntosh #2		3 August 2024	Paris	
	6	2:06.58	Hosszú #2		9 August 2016	Rio de Janeiro	
5	7	2:06.63	Kaylee McKeown	Australia	10 June 2024	Brisbane	
	8	2:06.69	McIntosh #3		28 July 2025	Singapore	
6	9	2:06.79	Kate Douglass	United States	22 June 2024	Indianapolis	
7	10	2:06.82	Yu Yiting	China	17 June 2026	Hangzhou	
	11	2:06.84	Hosszú #3		2 August 2015	Kazan	
8	12	2:06.88	Siobhan-Marie O'Connor	Great Britain	9 August 2016	Rio de Janeiro	
	13	2:06.89	McIntosh #4		30 March 2023	Toronto	
	14	2:06.92	Douglass #2		3 August 2024	Paris	
	15	2:06.99	McKeown #2		17 April 2024	Gold Coast	
	16	2:07.00	Hosszú #4		24 July 2017	Budapest	
	17	2:07.02	Hosszú #5		21 July 2019	Gwangju	
	18	2:07.03	Kukors #2		26 July 2009	Rome	
9	18	2:07.03	Stephanie Rice	Australia	27 July 2009	Rome	
	20	2:07.04	Douglass #3		17 June 2026	Indianapolis	
	21	2:07.05	Douglass #4		12 February 2024	Doha	
	22	2:07.06	McIntosh #5		19 May 2024	Toronto	
	23	2:07.09	Douglass #5		1 July 2023	Indianapolis	
10	24	2:07.13	Alex Walsh	United States	19 June 2022	Budapest	
	25	2:07.14	Hosszú #6		23 July 2017	Budapest	
11		2:07.57	Ye Shiwen	China	31 July 2012	London	
12		2:07.68	Sydney Pickrem	Canada	19 May 2024	Toronto	
13		2:07.91	Yui Ohashi	Japan	24 July 2017	Budapest	
14		2:08.15	Alicia Coutts	Australia	31 July 2012	London	
15		2:08.17	Abbie Wood	Great Britain	18 April 2026	London	
16		2:08.32	Qi Hui	China	17 October 2009	Jinan	
16		2:08.32	Kathleen Baker	United States	29 July 2018	Irvine	
18		2:08.34	Kim Seo-yeong	South Korea	24 August 2018	Jakarta	
19		2:08.45	Kanako Watanabe	Japan	3 August 2015	Kazan	
20		2:08.47	Torri Huske	United States	13 April 2024	San Antonio	
21		2:08.48	Regan Smith	United States	2 June 2023	Tempe	
22		2:08.51	Madisyn Cox	United States	22 May 2021	Austin	
23		2:08.55	Anastasia Gorbenko	Israel	29 May 2024	Barcelona	
24		2:08.59	Kirsty Coventry	Zimbabwe	13 August 2008	Beijing	
25		2:08.64	Rika Omoto	Japan	10 May 2019	Sydney	

=== Women short course ===
- Correct as of October 2026

Ath.#	Perf.#	Time	Athlete	Nation	Date	Place	Ref.
1	1	2:01.63	Kate Douglass	United States	10 December 2024	Budapest	
	2	2:01.66	Douglass #2		30 October 2026	Westmont	
2	3	2:01.83	Marritt Steenbergen	Netherlands	6 December 2025	Lublin	
3	4	2:01.86	Katinka Hosszú	Hungary	6 December 2014	Doha	
	5	2:02.12	Douglass #3		13 December 2022	Melbourne	
	6	2:02.13	Hosszú #2		31 August 2014	Dubai	
	7	2:02.53	Hosszú #3		5 December 2015	Netanya	
	8	2:02.61	Hosszú #4		27 August 2014	Doha	
4	9	2:02.63	Yu Yiting	China	17 October 2026	Astana	
5	10	2:02.65	Alex Walsh	United States	10 December 2024	Budapest	
6	11	2:02.75	Abbie Wood	Great Britain	10 December 2024	Budapest	
	12	2:02.76	Douglass #4		16 October 2026	Charlottesville	
	13	2:02.80	Yu #2		3 October 2026	Baku	
	14	2:02.90	Hosszú #5		10 December 2016	Windsor	
	15	2:03.07	Hosszú #6		27 August 2014	Doha	
	16	2:03.20	Hosszú #7		7 August 2013	Eindhoven	
	17	2:03.25	Hosszú #8		10 August 2013	Berlin	
	17	2:03.25	Hosszú #9		15 December 2018	Hangzhou	
	19	2:03.34	Yu #3		10 October 2026	Tashkent	
	20	2:03.37	Walsh #2		13 December 2022	Melbourne	
7	21	2:03.57	Kaylee McKeown	Australia	13 December 2022	Melbourne	
	22	2:03.60	Hosszú #10		29 September 2014	Hong Kong	
	23	2:03.66	Hosszú #11		12 December 2015	Indianapolis	
	24	2:03.68	McKeown #2		27 November 2020	Brisbane	
8	25	2:03.93	Yui Ohashi	Japan	14 November 2020	Budapest	
9		2:04.00	Sydney Pickrem	Canada	21 November 2020	Budapest	
10		2:04.06	Melanie Margalis	United States	16 October 2020	Budapest	
11		2:04.30	Mary-Sophie Harvey	Canada	10 December 2024	Budapest	
12		2:04.60	Julia Smit	United States	19 December 2009	Manchester	
13		2:04.64	Evelyn Verrasztó	Hungary	10 December 2009	Istanbul	
13		2:04.64	Ye Shiwen	China	15 December 2012	Istanbul	
13		2:04.64	Kayla Sanchez	Canada	14 December 2018	Sheffield	
16		2:04.75	Ellen Walshe	Ireland	25 October 2025	Toronto	
17		2:04.91	Caitlin Leverenz	United States	16 December 2011	Atlanta	
18		2:04.92	Beata Nelson	United States	5 November 2022	Indianapolis	
19		2:04.93	Anastasia Gorbenko	Israel	19 October 2025	Westmont	
20		2:05.02	Ella Eastin	United States	10 December 2016	Windsor	
21		2:05.13	Siobhan-Marie O'Connor	Great Britain	5 December 2015	Netanya	
22		2:05.38	Bailey Andison	Canada	9 September 2021	Naples	
23		2:05.41	Rikako Ikee	Japan	14 January 2018	Tokyo	
24		2:05.46	Emily Seebohm	Australia	18 November 2017	Singapore	
25		2:05.54	Kathleen Baker	United States	15 December 2018	Hangzhou	

== Olympic champions ==
=== Men ===
Edition	Winner	Time	Notes	Ref.
Mexico City 1968	Charlie Hickcox (USA)	2:12.0	OR	
(West Germany) Munich 1972	Gunnar Larsson (SWE)	2:07.17	WR	
1976–1980	not held			
(United States) Los Angeles 1984	Alex Baumann (CAN)	2:01.42	WR	
(South Korea) Seoul 1988	Tamás Darnyi (HUN)	2:00.17	WR	
(Spain) Barcelona 1992	Tamás Darnyi (HUN)	2:00.76		
(United States) Atlanta 1996	Attila Czene (HUN)	1:59.91	OR	
(Australia) Sydney 2000	Massimiliano Rosolino (ITA)	1:58.98	OR	
(Greece) Athens 2004	Michael Phelps (USA)	1:57.14	OR	
(China) Beijing 2008	Michael Phelps (USA)	1:54.23	WR	
(United Kingdom) London 2012	Michael Phelps (USA)	1:54.27		
(Brazil) Rio de Janeiro 2016	Michael Phelps (USA)	1:54.66		
(Japan) Tokyo 2020	Wang Shun (CHN)	1:55.00		
(France) Paris 2024	Léon Marchand (FRA)	1:54.06	OR	

=== Women ===
Edition	Winner	Time	Notes	Ref.
Mexico City 1968	Claudia Kolb (USA)	2:24.7	OR	
(West Germany) Munich 1972	Shane Gould (AUS)	2:23.07	WR	
1976–1980	not held			
(United States) Los Angeles 1984	Tracy Caulkins (USA)	2:12.64	OR	
(South Korea) Seoul 1988	Daniela Hunger (GDR)	2:12.59	OR	
(Spain) Barcelona 1992	Lin Li (CHN)	2:11.65	WR	
(United States) Atlanta 1996	Michelle Smith (IRL)	2:13.93		
(Australia) Sydney 2000	Yana Klochkova (UKR)	2:10.68	OR	
(Greece) Athens 2004	Yana Klochkova (UKR)	2:11.14		
(China) Beijing 2008	Stephanie Rice (AUS)	2:08.45	WR	
(United Kingdom) London 2012	Ye Shiwen (CHN)	2:07.57	OR	
(Brazil) Rio de Janeiro 2016	Katinka Hosszú (HUN)	2:06.58	OR	
(Japan) Tokyo 2020	Yui Ohashi (JPN)	2:08.52		
(France) Paris 2024	Summer McIntosh (CAN)	2:06.56	OR	

== World champions (long course) ==
=== Men ===
Edition	Winner	Time	Notes	Ref.
(Socialist Federal Republic of Yugoslavia) Belgrade 1973	Gunnar Larsson (SWE)	2:08.36	CR	
(Colombia) Cali 1975	András Hargitay (HUN)	2:07.72	CR	
(West Germany) West Berlin 1978	Graham Smith (CAN)	2:03.65	WR	
(Ecuador) Guayaquil 1982	Oleksandr Sydorenko (URS)	2:03.30	CR	
(Spain) Madrid 1986	Tamás Darnyi (HUN)	2:01.57	CR	
(Australia) Perth 1991	Tamás Darnyi (HUN)	1:59.36	WR	
(Italy) Rome 1994	Jani Sievinen (FIN)	1:58.16	WR	
(Australia) Perth 1998	Marcel Wouda (NED)	2:01.18		
(Japan) Fukuoka 2001	Massimiliano Rosolino (ITA)	1:59.71		
(Spain) Barcelona 2003	Michael Phelps (USA)	1:56.04	WR	
(Canada) Montreal 2005	Michael Phelps (USA)	1:56.68		
(Australia) Melbourne 2007	Michael Phelps (USA)	1:54.98	WR	
(Italy) Rome 2009	Ryan Lochte (USA)	1:54.10	WR	
(China) Shanghai 2011	Ryan Lochte (USA)	1:54.00	WR	
(Spain) Barcelona 2013	Ryan Lochte (USA)	1:54.98		
(Russia) Kazan 2015	Ryan Lochte (USA)	1:55.81		
(Hungary) Budapest 2017	Chase Kalisz (USA)	1:55.56		
(South Korea) Gwangju 2019	Daiya Seto (JPN)	1:56.14		
(Hungary) Budapest 2022	Léon Marchand (FRA)	1:55.22		
(Japan) Fukuoka 2023	Léon Marchand (FRA)	1:54.82		
(Qatar) Doha 2024	Finlay Knox (CAN)	1:56.64		
Singapore 2025	Léon Marchand (FRA)	1:53.68	(Note: Léon Marchand set a world record of 1:52.69 in the semifinals.)	

=== Women ===
Edition	Winner	Time	Notes	Ref.
(Socialist Federal Republic of Yugoslavia) Belgrade 1973	Andrea Hubner (GDR)	2:20.51	WR	
(Colombia) Cali 1975	Kathy Heddy (USA)	2:19.80	CR	
(West Germany) West Berlin 1978	Tracy Caulkins (USA)	2:14.07	WR	
(Ecuador) Guayaquil 1982	Petra Schneider (GDR)	2:11.79	CR	
(Spain) Madrid 1986	Kristin Otto (GDR)	2:15.56		
(Australia) Perth 1991	Lin Li (CHN)	2:13.40		
(Italy) Rome 1994	Lü Bin (CHN)	2:12.34		
(Australia) Perth 1998	Wu Yanyan (CHN)	2:10.88	CR	
(Japan) Fukuoka 2001	Maggie Bowen (USA)	2:11.93		
(Spain) Barcelona 2003	Yana Klochkova (UKR)	2:10.75	CR	
(Canada) Montreal 2005	Katie Hoff (USA)	2:10.41	CR	
(Australia) Melbourne 2007	Katie Hoff (USA)	2:10.13	CR	
(Italy) Rome 2009	Ariana Kukors (USA)	2:06.15	WR	
(China) Shanghai 2011	Ye Shiwen (CHN)	2:08.90		
(Spain) Barcelona 2013	Katinka Hosszú (HUN)	2:07.92		
(Russia) Kazan 2015	Katinka Hosszú (HUN)	2:06.12	WR	
(Hungary) Budapest 2017	Katinka Hosszú (HUN)	2:07.00		
(South Korea) Gwangju 2019	Katinka Hosszú (HUN)	2:07.53		
(Hungary) Budapest 2022	Alex Walsh (USA)	2:07.13		
(Japan) Fukuoka 2023	Kate Douglass (USA)	2:07.17		
(Qatar) Doha 2024	Kate Douglass (USA)	2:07.05		
Singapore 2025	Summer McIntosh (CAN)	2:06.69		

== World champions (short course) ==
=== Men ===
Edition	Winner	Time	Notes	Ref.
(Spain) Palma de Mallorca 1993	Christian Keller (GER)	1:56.80	CR	
(Brazil) Rio de Janeiro 1995	Matthew Dunn (AUS)	1:56.86		
(Sweden) Gothenburg 1997	Matthew Dunn (AUS)	1:57.46		
Hong Kong 1999	Matthew Dunn (AUS)	1:55.81	CR	
(Greece) Athens 2000	Jani Sievinen (FIN)	1:56.27		
(Russia) Moscow 2002	Jani Sievinen (FIN)	1:55.45	CR	
(United States) Indianapolis 2004	Thiago Pereira (BRA)	1:55.78		
(China) Shanghai 2006	Ryan Lochte (USA)	1:53.31	WR	
(United Kingdom) Manchester 2008	Ryan Lochte (USA)	1:51.56	WR	
(United Arab Emirates) Dubai 2010	Ryan Lochte (USA)	1:50.08	WR	
(Turkey) Istanbul 2012	Ryan Lochte (USA)	1:49.63	WR	
(Qatar) Doha 2014	Kosuke Hagino (JPN)	1:50.47		
(Canada) Windsor 2016	Wang Shun (CHN)	1:51.74		
(China) Hangzhou 2018	Wang Shun (CHN)	1:51.01		
(United Arab Emirates) Abu Dhabi 2021	Daiya Seto (JPN)	1:51.15		
(Australia) Melbourne 2022	Matthew Sates (RSA)	1:50.15		
(Hungary) Budapest 2024	Shaine Casas (USA)	1:49.51	CR	

=== Women ===
Edition	Winner	Time	Notes	Ref.
(Spain) Palma de Mallorca 1993	Allison Wagner (USA)	2:07.79	WR	
(Brazil) Rio de Janeiro 1995	Elli Overton (AUS)	2:11.67		
(Sweden) Gothenburg 1997	Louise Karlsson (SWE)	2:11.19		
Hong Kong 1999	Martina Moravcová (SVK)	2:08.55		
(Greece) Athens 2000	Yana Klochkova (UKR)	2:08.97		
(Russia) Moscow 2002	Yana Klochkova (UKR)	2:08.82		
(United States) Indianapolis 2004	Brooke Hanson (AUS)	2:09.81		
(China) Shanghai 2006	Qi Hui (CHN)	2:09.33		
(United Kingdom) Manchester 2008	Kirsty Coventry (ZIM)	2:06.13	WR	
(United Arab Emirates) Dubai 2010	Mireia Belmonte (ESP)	2:05.73	CR	
(Turkey) Istanbul 2012	Ye Shiwen (CHN)	2:04.64	CR	
(Qatar) Doha 2014	Katinka Hosszú (HUN)	2:01.86	WR	
(Canada) Windsor 2016	Katinka Hosszú (HUN)	2:02.90		
(China) Hangzhou 2018	Katinka Hosszú (HUN)	2:03.25		
(United Arab Emirates) Abu Dhabi 2021	Sydney Pickrem (CAN)	2:04.29		
(Australia) Melbourne 2022	Kate Douglass (USA)	2:02.12		
(Hungary) Budapest 2024	Kate Douglass (USA)	2:01.63	WR	

== See also ==
- Medley swimming
- World record progression 200 metres medley
