= Music of New York =

Music of New York may refer to:

- Music of New York City
- Music of New York (state)
