= Jetlag festival =

Annual American music and arts festival

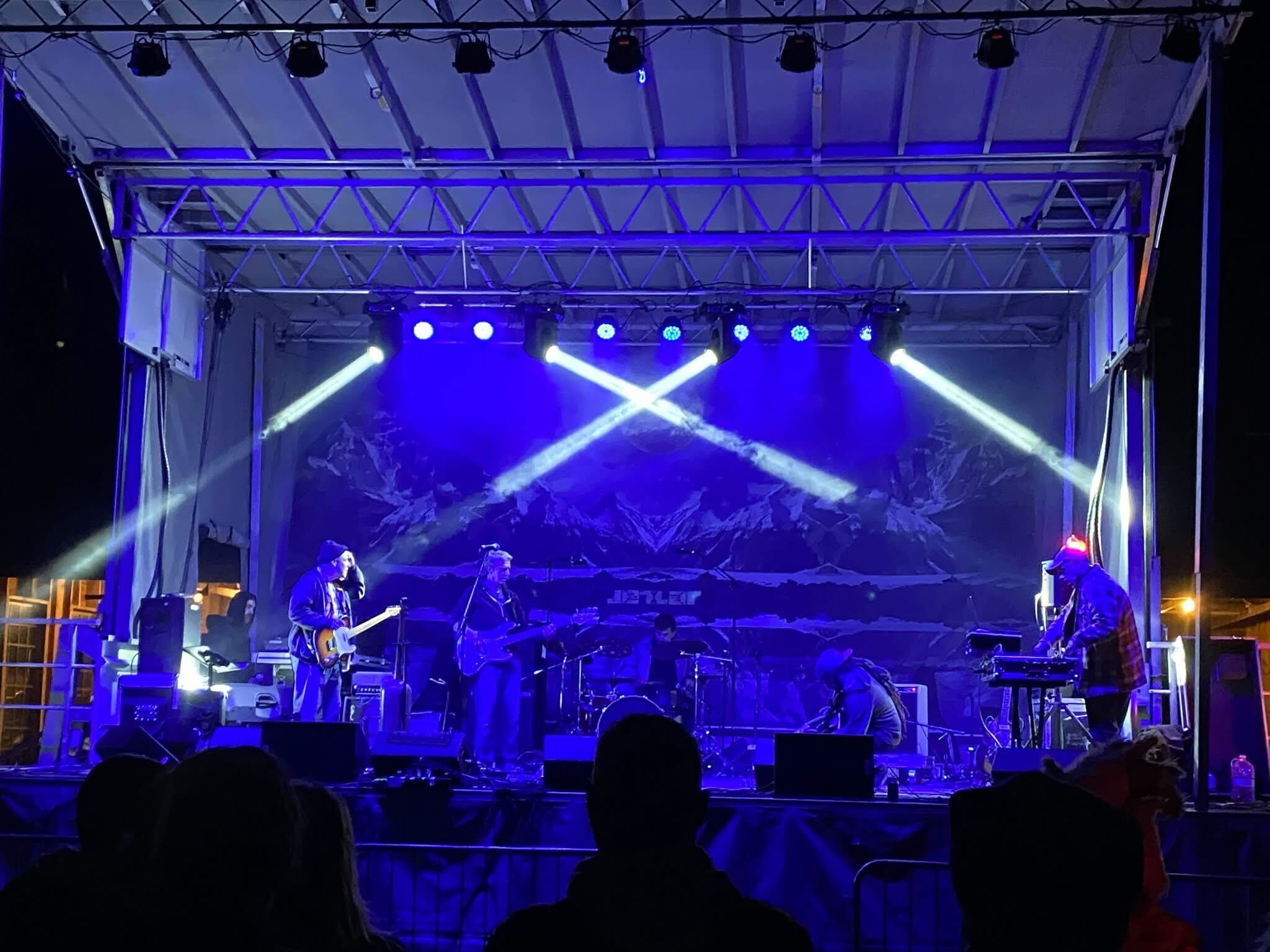
JetLAG main stage

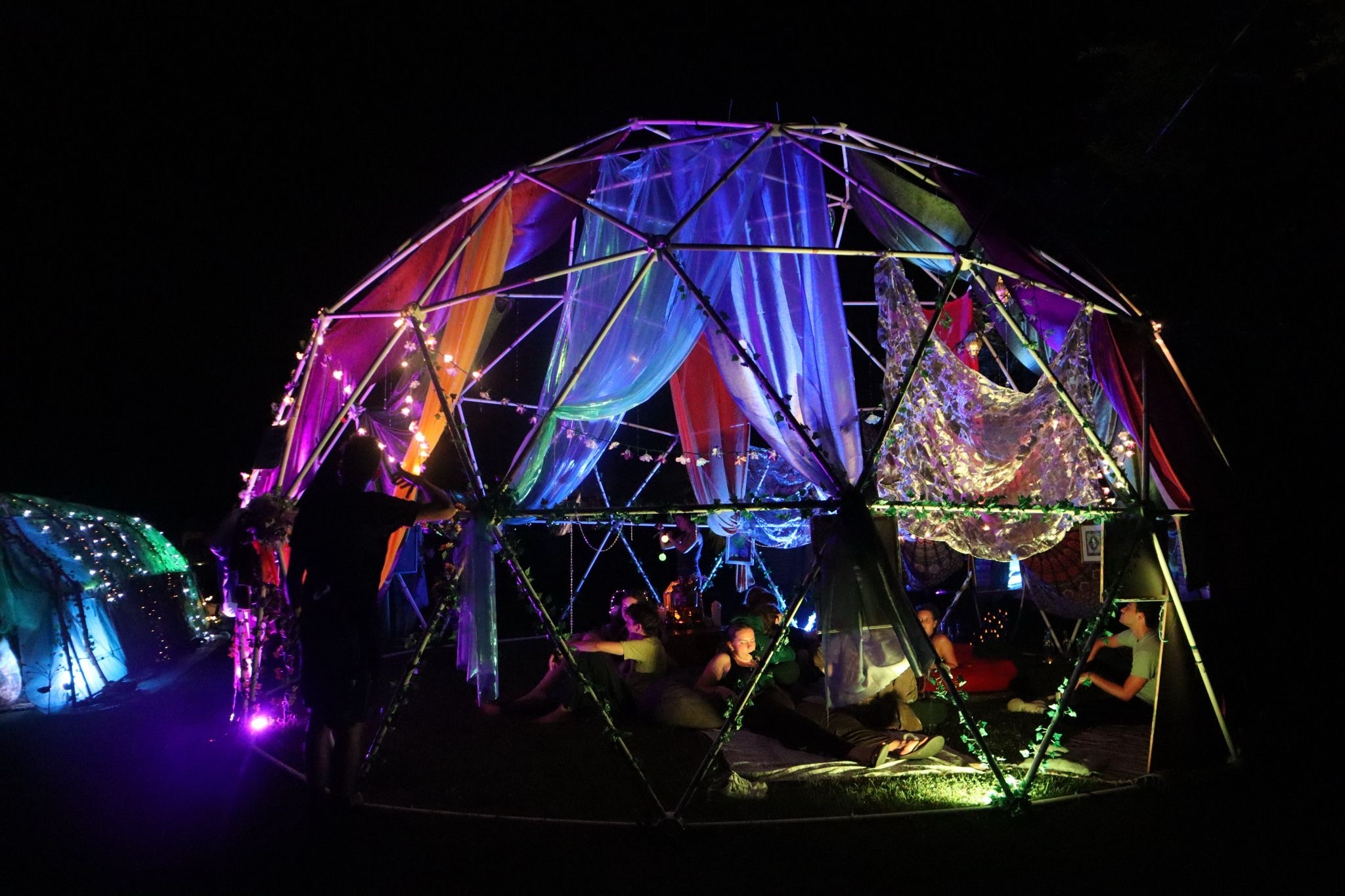
JetLAG vibe at night

JetLAG is an independent music and arts festival founded in 2009 and associated with Russian-speaking and Eastern European diaspora communities in the United States. The slogan of the festival is: "You'll Find What You Love, You'll Love What You Find". It is located in upstate New York featuring music, dance, visual arts, poetry, workshops and dedicated programming for children.

The name combines 'jet lag' and the Russian word lager ('camp'). The name was intended to symbolize connections across geographic distances.

The festival's programming includes cross-cultural, diaspora, traditional, contemporary and experimental music and arts. In addition to performances, the event includes workshops and other community activities.

Following the 2022 Russian invasion of Ukraine, the festival hosted artists who publicly opposed the war and participated in related fundraising and cultural initiatives.

== History ==
| Year | Location | Theme | Major performers |
|---|---|---|---|
| 2009 | Indian Head, Pennsylvania | Just JetLAG | Lenya Fedorov; Frank London; Olga Chikina; Psoy Korolenko |
| 2010 | Wind Gap, Pennsylvania | French Chanson | Lenya Fedorov & Vladimir Volkov; Billy's Band; Aleksandr F. Skliar |
| 2011 | Full Moon Resort, New York | Open-Air Cabaret | Little Annie Bandez; BadBuka; Jonathan Kane; Ned Rotenberg |
| 2012 | Peaceful Valley, New York | JetLAG.edu | AUKTYON; Jonathan Kane; Olga Chikina; Psoy & Daniel Khan |
| 2013 | Peaceful Valley, New York | Myth and Legends from around the world | Ken Hensley; Stantsiya Mir; Vanya Zhuk; Olga Chikina |
| 2014 | Peaceful Valley, New York | Silver Age | Nord Ost musical; Psoy & Alyona Arenkova; Lenya Fedorov & Vladimir Volkov |
| 2015 | Peaceful Valley, New York | Good Chemistry | Hazmat Modine; Fedorov & Kruzenshtern; Mikhail Borzykin; Nikolay Yakimov; Gerbert Morales; Michael Alpert, Daniel Kahn, Psoy, Jake Shulman-Ment |
| 2016 | Peaceful Valley, New York | Equilibrium | Cabaret-Band Silver Wedding; Vassili Urievski; Vadim Kolpakov and Vanya Zhuk; Opa! |
| 2017 | Peaceful Valley, New York | Genesis | AUKTYON; Fedor Chistyakov; Daniel Kahn; Anna Khvostenko and Alisa Ten; Vanya Zhuk |
| 2018 | Peaceful Valley, New York | Decalag | Flying Balalaika Brothers; Daniel Kahn and the Painted Bird; Fedorov and Krutogolov; Alexey Paperny; Natalia Nelubova |
| 2019 | Peaceful Valley, New York | Utopia | Olga Chikina; Fedor Chistyakov; Zhenya Rock; Psoy and Polina Shepherd |
| 2021 | Peaceful Valley, New York | Genius Loci | Omar Torrez; Jon Flaugher; Sergio Dias; Hazmat Modine; Mikhail Bashakov; Roman Lankin |
| 2022 | Peaceful Valley, New York | Serendipity | Bella's Bartok; Frank London and Eleanore Reissa; Alexey Levstein; Max Guselshchikov; Aleksandr Shcherbina |
| 2023 | Peaceful Valley, New York | Escapology | Boris Grebenshchikov; Joshua Dolgin; Masha Vasilevskaya with Sveta Ben; Alexey Paperny; Alexey Ivashenko |
| 2024 | Peaceful Valley, New York | Neoteric | N.O.M; Enver Izmaylov; Stranniki; Mikhail Shcherbakov; Olga Chikina |
| 2025 | Peaceful Valley, New York | Euphonia | Vopli Vidopliassova; Devotchka; Hazmat Modine; Billy Martin; Veronika Dolina; Psoy Korolenko and Anna Shternshis; Nadya Chechet |
| 2026 | Fort Ann, New York | Perpetua | The Klezmatics & Joshua Nelson Omar Torrez and Prinz Board Alexey Paperny Zhenya Rock Vadim Pevzner |
