= Mark Slobin =

American scholar and ethnomusicologist

Mark Slobin is an American scholar and ethnomusicologist who has written extensively on the subject of East European Jewish music and klezmer music, as well as the music of Afghanistan, where he conducted research beginning in 1967. He is Winslow-Kaplan Professor of Music Emeritus at Wesleyan University, where he taught both music and American Studies from 1971 to 2016.

He has been the president of the Society for Ethnomusicology and the Society for Asian Music. Two of his books on Jewish music have won the ASCAP-Deems Taylor Award.

In 1981 and 2001, he edited and reissued collections of the Ukrainian Jewish ethnomusicologist Moses Beregovsky.

== Published works ==
- Subcultural Sounds: Micromusics of the West
- Chosen Voices: The Story of the American Cantorate
- Tenement Songs: The Popular Music of the Jewish Immigrants
- Fiddler on the Move : Exploring the Klezmer World
- American Klezmer : Its roots and offshoots
- Old Jewish Folk Music: The Collections and Writings of Moshe Beregovski
- Global Soundtracks : Worlds of film music (ed.)
- Music in the Culture of Northern Afghanistan. Tucson: Univ. of Arizona Press. (1976)

== Documentary ==
- 1981 "Number 7: They All Know It," video, as project supervisor, script co-writer.
- 1983 "Music in the Afghan North," video
- 1986 "More than a Singer," project director, script consultant
- 2003 Afghanistan Untouched, 2-cd set of field recordings, Traditional Crossroads.
