= Joe Heaney =

Irish traditional singer (1919–1984)

Seosamh Ó hÉanaí
- Born: Seosamh Ó hÉanaí; 15 October 1919; Carna, Connemara, Ireland
- Died: 1 May 1984 (aged 64) Seattle, Washington, U.S.
- Genre: Sean-nós
- Occupation: Singer
- Instrument: Vocals
- Labels: Topic Records; Gael-Linn Records

Joe Heaney (AKA Joe Éinniú; Irish: Seosamh Ó hÉanaí) (1 October 1919 – 1 May 1984) was an Irish traditional (sean nós) singer from Connemara, County Galway, Ireland. He spent most of his adult life abroad, living in England, Scotland and New York City, in the course of which he recorded hundreds of songs.

== Biography ==
Heaney was born in Carna, a village in Connemara, County Galway, along the west coast of Ireland. This is an Irish-speaking district. He said he started singing at the age of five, but his shyness kept him from singing in public until he was 20. He learned English at school in Carna. When he was 16 years old, he won a scholarship to attend school in Dublin. While there he won first and second prizes at a national singing competition. Most of his repertoire (estimated to exceed 500 songs) was learned while growing up in Carna.

In 1949, he went to London where he worked on building sites and became involved in the folk-music scene. He recorded for the Topic and Gael-linn labels. He was married for six years until his wife died of tuberculosis.

He was recorded by Pádraic Ó Raghallaigh for Raidió Teilifís Éireann, and by Peter Kennedy for the BBC in 1959. The BBC recordings were assembled on a BBC LP, not commercially issued, as BBC LP 22570.

He visited America in 1965 at the invitation of the Newport Folk Festival. After singing at Newport, he decided to move to America and settled in New York City.

In 1981, Australian folk historian Warren Fahey brought Heaney to Australia, where he filled the Sydney Opera House Concert Hall.

From 1982 until 1984, Heaney was an artist-in-residence at the University of Washington in Seattle, and previously had taught at Wesleyan University in Middletown, Connecticut. The Joe Heaney Collection of the University of Washington Ethnomusicology Archives was established after Heaney's death in 1984. The entirety of the collection was transferred to the National University of Ireland at Galway, where it is freely available online.

The Féile Chomórtha Joe Éinniú (Joe Heaney Commemorative Festival) is held every year in Carna.

In 2007, an Irish-language biography of him titled Seosamh Ó hÉanaí: Nár Fhágha Mé Bás Choíche by Liam Mac Con Iomaire was published. In 2011, Bright Star of the West: Joe Heaney, Irish Song-Man, co-authored by Sean Williams and Lillis Ó Laoire, was published. The 2011 biography discusses his work in the larger context of Ireland and the United States, and it won the 2012 Alan P. Merriam Prize for best monograph from the Society for Ethnomusicology.

== Partial discography ==
- "Caoineadh na dtrí Máire" (The Lament of the Three Marys) (Gael Linn CE2 1957) 78 RPM
- "Neansín Bhán" (Fair Nancy) (Gael Linn CE3 1957) 78 RPM
- "Bean an Leanna" (The Woman with the Beer) Gael Linn CE4 1957) 78 RPM
- Individual songs on Gael Linn Discs (various artists): "Amhrán na Trá Báine" (Gael Linn CE16), "Amhrán na Páise" (Gael Linn CE17), "Sadhbh Ní Bhruinneallaigh" & "Is Measa Liom Bródach" (Gael Linn CE18) 1960 78 RPM, reissued in "Seoltaí Séidte" (Gael Linn CEFCD 184 2004) (various artists)
- "Amhráin Aniar" (Gael Linn GL4 c1960) 4 track EP 45 RPM
- "Joe Heaney: Morrisey & the Russian Sailor" (Collector Records JEI 5 1960) 3 track EP 45 RPM
- "Joe Heaney: The Bonny Bunch of Roses & Other Irish Songs" (Collector Records JEI 7 1960) 3 track EP 45 RPM
- "Joe Heaney Sings Traditional Songs in Gaelic and English" (Topic 1963; Ossian c 1979)
- "Come All Ye Gallant Irishmen" (Philo 1963, 2004; Clo Iar-Chonnachta, c1989)
- "Irish Music in London Pubs" (Folkways Records FW 3575 1965; reissued Cló Iar-Chonnachta 1990) (various artists recorded 1958)
- "Seoda Ceoil 2" (Gael Linn CEF 022 1969) (various artists)
- "Seosamh Ó hÉanaí" (Gael Linn CEF 028 1971) (Cover notes by Seán Mac Réamoinn), reissued as disc one in "Seosamh Ó hÉanaí: Ó Mo Dhúchas/From My Tradition Sraith 1 & Sraith 2" (Gael Linn CEFCD 191 2007)
- "Joe Heaney" (1975 Philo 2004) (Jacket notes by Kenneth S. Goldstein and Michael Maloney)
- "Seosamh Ó hÉanaí, sraith 2. Ó Mo Dhúchas: From My Tradition" (Gael Linn CEF 051 1976) (Cover notes by Seán Mac Réamoinn), reissued as "The Best of Joe Heaney: From My Tradition" (Shanachie 19 August 1997) and as disc two in "Seosamh Ó hÉanaí: Ó Mo Dhúchas/From My Tradition. Sraith 1 & Sraith 2" (Gael Linn CEFCD 191 2007)
- "Joe and the Gabe" (with Gabe O'Sullivan) (Green Linnet 1979)
- "Say a Song: Joe Heaney in the Pacific Northwest" (Trade Root Music / Northwest Folklife NWARCD 001 October 15, 1996)
- "Road from Connemara: Songs and Stories Told and Sung to Ewan MacColl and Peggy Seeger" (Topic Records 31 October 2000)
- "Tell a Story: Joe Heaney in the Pacific Northwest" (Camsco 701 February 5, 2008) (Liner notes by Sean Williams)
- "Wife of the Bold Tenant Farmer" from Irish Traditional Songs in Gaelic & English was included in Topic Records' 70-year anniversary boxed set Three Score and Ten (Topic Records TOPIC70 2009) as track sixteen on the third CD.

== Documentaries ==
- Joe Heaney: Sing the Dark Away by Michael Davitt (Radio Telefís Éireann, 1996)
- Song of Granite by Pat Collins, 2017

== Awards and honors ==
Heaney was a recipient of a 1982 National Heritage Fellowship awarded by the National Endowment for the Arts, which is the United States government's highest honor in the folk and traditional arts. That year's fellowships were the first bestowed by the NEA.

== See also ==
- Traditional Irish Singers
- Darach Ó Catháin
