= Society for Asian Music =

Academic society founded in 1959

The Society for Asian Music is an academic society founded in 1959. Its journal Asian Music was established in 1969. It is an English-language journal covering ethnomusicology in Asian music. Editors-in-chief have included the musicologists Mark Slobin, Martin Hatch, Sean Williams, and currently Ricardo Trimillos.
