= Ada Svetlova =

Latvian opera singer

Ada Svetlova – Latvian singer, mezzo-soprano, and performer of classical and ethnic repertoire.

== Biography ==
Born in 1939 in Kharkiv, Ukraine (former USSR). She graduated from the Conservatory of Chişinău, Moldova (former Moldavian SSR, USSR). She served as a soloist of the Latvian State Philharmonic in Riga (former Latvian SSR, USSR). Svetlova was known as a chamber singer of classical repertoire. In the 70-80s years of last century she got the fame of a fine interpreter of Yiddish folksongs arranged in a contemporary classical idiom by Max Goldin. Later on, A.Svetlova was joined by the Riga instrumental ensemble "Via tertia" under the direction of Samuel Heifetz, who created a crossroad mode arrangements for her songs, attainable by a wider audience. She works as a vocal coach residing in Tel-Aviv, Israel.

== Recordings ==
- Jewish Folksongs, arranged by Max Goldin, Ada Svetlova (vocals), Natalia Schroeder (piano). LP. Allunion Recording Label Melodiya, USSR, 1981, C30-13293-4

== Sources ==
- Tobias Shklover. "The chant of her soul" (in Yiddish), Sovetysh Heymland magazine, issue 11, 1988, Moscow, USSR
- T.Shklover. "Date with Jewish music" (in Yiddish). Folks-Sztyme weekly, No.23 (4885) of 6 March 1988, Warsaw, Poland
