= Medley swimming =

Combination of four swimming styles into one race

Butterfly

Backstroke

Breaststroke

Front crawl

Medley swimming is a combination of four different swimming strokes butterfly, backstroke, breaststroke, freestyle (usually front crawl), into one race. This race is either swum by one swimmer as individual medley (IM) or by four swimmers as a medley relay.

== Individual medley ==
An individual medley consists of a single swimmer swimming equal distances of the four strokes. The World Aquatics rules dictate that butterfly must be swum first, followed by backstroke, breaststroke, and then freestyle. (Note: During the freestyle portion of the race, swimmers are allowed to swim however they like, provided that they swim on their front.)

=== Competitions ===
A number of competitions in the individual medley are regularly contested, by both men and women. The competitions are limited in that every distance must consist of either four lengths of the pool (100-yard or -meter) or a multiple of four lengths (200- or 400-yard/- meter), so that no stroke must change mid-length. Regardless of the length of the individual medley, each stroke comprises a quarter of the overall distance.

- 100 m/yd individual medley: Swum in short-course (25 m/yd pool) competition only. This is not an Olympic event.
- 200 m/yd individual medley: Swum in both short course and long-course (50 m pool) competitions. This was swum as an Olympic event in the 1968 Summer Olympics, Mexico City, Mexico but then omitted until the 1984 Summer Olympics, Los Angeles, United States. The event has been swum ever since.
- 400 m/yd individual medley: Swum in both short course and long course competitions. This has been an Olympic event since the 1964 Summer Olympics, Tokyo, Japan.

=== Technique ===
The technique for individual medley events does not differ much from the technique for the separate events for the four strokes. The main difference is the turning technique needed when transitioning from one stroke to the next stroke. Each section has to be completed as described by the stroke rules of this section.

The transitions are as follows:

- Butterfly to Backstroke
- Backstroke to Breaststroke
- Breaststroke to Freestyle

When transitioning from Butterfly to Backstroke, swimmers must abide by World Aquatics rules and regulations in regards to turns. They are listed as follows:

- When transitioning from butterfly to backstroke, swimmers must be on their stomach, and touch the wall with both hands simultaneously, either in, out, or at the surface of the water, then turn in any matter they wish as long as the swimmer's shoulder is vertical or towards the back when they leave the wall. An acceptable turn includes an open turn, which is commonly used.
- When transitioning from backstroke to breaststroke, swimmers must touch the wall with some part of their body while still on their back. The swimmer's shoulder may be turned vertical to the chest but no more than that when executing a turn. Some acceptable turns are the bucket turn, crossover turn, or an open turn.
- When transitioning from breaststroke to freestyle, swimmers must touch the wall with both hands simultaneously, similar to butterfly, either in, out, or at the surface of the water before turning. An acceptable turn includes an open turn.

For all the transitions, the swimmer may conduct their underwater phase for up to 15m, where then swimmers will have to resurface and continue swimming with proper technique.

== Medley relay ==
The medley relay consists of four different swimmers in one relay race, each swimming one of the four strokes.

=== Stroke order ===
The stroke order of the medley relay is different from that of the individual medley. Backstroke is the first event as this stroke is started from the water. If backstroke were not the first event, the starting backstroke swimmer and the finishing previous swimmer could block each other. The remaining strokes are sorted according to the speed, with breaststroke being the slowest, butterfly in the middle, and freestyle being the fastest stroke. The order of the strokes for medley relay is as follows:

- Backstroke
- Breaststroke
- Butterfly
- Freestyle: It can be any stroke except butterfly, backstroke, or breaststroke. Swimmers will generally use the front crawl.

Backstroke performances (only) are eligible for backstroke records, as they are performed under normal controlled starting conditions (i.e., reflex latency for the starting gun makes the average split time marginally quicker); for example, Ryan Murphy set the world record for the 100 m backstroke during the first leg of the 4 × 100 m medley relay at the 2016 Summer Olympics.

=== Competitions ===
There are a number of competitions swum regularly in medley relay, both by men and women.

- 4×50 m/yd medley relay: Swum in both short course and long course pools. This is not an Olympic event.
- 4×100 m/yd medley relay: Swum in both short course and long course pools. This was the first Olympic medley competition and has been swum since the 1960 Summer Olympics, Rome, Italy. The first Olympic butterfly event itself was first swum in the previous 1956 Summer Olympics.

Mixed-gendered medley relays were introduced at the 2014 FINA World Swimming Championships (25 m) (4×50 m) and 2015 World Aquatics Championships (4 × 100 m). The event debuted at the 2010 Summer Youth Olympics and 2020 Summer Olympics (4 × 100 m).

Standard United States high school swim meets have short course events, that is the lengths are typically swum in a 25-yard or meter long pool. One relay event swum in State or Sectional Championships is the 4×50 yard medley relay.

Many collegiate programs hold competition in the 4×50 medley relay, and 4×100 medley relay.

=== Technique ===
The technique for medley relay events does not differ much from the technique for the separate events for the four strokes and the basic set of relay rules. The only difference between the Medley Relay and the Individual Medley is the order of the strokes and the number of swimmers. The order for the medley relay is: backstroke, breaststroke, butterfly, and freestyle.

The main difference is for the second, third, and fourth swimmers on the relay team. The first swimmer swims backstroke normally, but all of the following swimmers must accurately judge the swimmer current swimming's distance, and conduct a relay dive right as the current swimmer touches the wall. There is no start signal for those swimmers. It is very important for the next swimmer off the block to accurately judge the time at which the swimmer in the water will touch the wall. A fast reaction could result in a significantly faster time in the race, but a false start (diving early) will result in a disqualification.

World Aquatics rules require that a foot of the second, third or fourth swimmer must be touching the platform while (and before) the incoming teammate is touching the wall; the starting swimmer may already be in motion, however, which saves 0.6 – 1 second compared to a regular start. Furthermore, many swimmers may perform better in a relay than in an individual race owing to a team spirit atmosphere. As a result, relay times are typically 2–3 second faster than the sum of best times of individual swimmers.

== History ==
Until 1952, the butterfly was not defined as a separate stroke from the breaststroke, and so medley races featured three styles: backstroke, breaststroke, and freestyle. The usual distance of both the IM and the medley relay was thus 300 metres or yards rather than 400. During a 150-meter Individual Medley race, Henry Myers was one of the first to use an overarm recovery while swimming breaststroke, becoming one of the earliest forms of butterfly. In the United States, during the year of 1953, some medley races included the butterfly stroke, and the Amateur Athletic Union made it mandatory in 1954.

From the beginning of the medley events, swimming times have drastically decreased due to science, technology, and improved training; e.g. technical swimming suits that reduce drag in the water and underwater cameras that help to analyze a swimmer's stroke.

== Rules ==
These are the official rules of World Aquatics, USA Swimming, and US Masters Swimming regarding medley swimming:

- In individual medley events, the swimmer covers the four swimming styles in the following order: butterfly, backstroke, breaststroke and freestyle.
- In medley relay events, swimmers will cover the four swimming styles in the following order: backstroke, breaststroke, butterfly and freestyle.
- Each section must be finished in accordance with the rule which applies to the style concerned.

Freestyle includes a special regulation for medley events:

- Freestyle means that in an event so designated the swimmer may swim any style, except that in individual medley or medley relay events, freestyle means any style other than backstroke, breaststroke or butterfly.

Additionally, the normal rules of relay events apply:

- Each swimmer should only swim in one leg of the relay
- The continuing swimmer should not start their leg until the previous swimmer has completed their leg
- No other team member shall jump into the pool apart from the one swimming the leg
- The proceeding swimmer's feet should not leave the diving block until the previous swimmer has completed their leg
- There shall be four swimmers on each relay team
- Mixed relay teams must consist of two men and two women. (In any order)

Failure to abide by any of the rules listed above will result in a disqualification if found appropriate by the referee.

== Para-Swimmers in the Medley ==
In 1960, the U.S. Paralympics added swimming as a sport. Para-Swimming is where swimmers with physical disabilities can compete with other swimmers with physical disabilities in swimming. While swimming, those swimmers are not allowed to wear any prosthetics or any assistive devices.

While swimming the Individual Medley, para-swimmers are put into different categories depending on their physical disability. They are listed below:

- SM1: para swimmers who are highly affected in their arms, legs, and trunk.
- SM2: para swimmers who are highly affected in their trunks, legs, and hands. Their arms are a little more viable but are still affected.
- SM3: para swimmers who have lowly affected arms, but may be missing legs. Their legs and trunks remain barely viable.
- SM4: para swimmers who have trouble with their hands. They may be missing their hand(s).
- SM5: para swimmers who have difficulty coordinating in the water. Their legs are highly affected.
- SM6: para swimmers who have one side of their body heavily affected.
- SM7: para swimmers who have one side of their body moderately affected, but still have trouble.
- SM8: para swimmers who can use one arm, moderately affected legs, or lack overall muscle power.
- SM9: para swimmers who have a lot of weakness in one leg.
- SM10: para swimmers who have little issue(s) with their leg. They have trouble keeping a stroke pattern.

There are also visual ratings:

- SM11: para swimmers who are almost totally blind.
- SM12: para swimmers who have a hard time seeing.
- SM13: para swimmers who are able to see the end of the pool at the length of 5 meters.

And finally, there is an intellectual category:

- SM14: para swimmers who are intellectually challenged. They have difficulty understanding techniques and strategies.

== World records ==
All the listed below world record times have been swam in Long Course Meters (LCM.)

Men

World records	200 m individual medley	(France) Léon Marchand (FRA)	1:52.69	Singapore	July 30, 2025
World records	400 m individual medley	(France) Léon Marchand (FRA)	4:02.50	Fukuoka, Japan	July 23, 2023
World records	4×100 m medley relay	United States: Ryan Murphy; Michael Andrew; Caeleb Dressel; Zach Apple	3:26.78	Tokyo, Japan	July 31, 2021

Women

World records	200 m individual medley	(Canada) Summer McIntosh (CAN)	2:05.70	Victoria, Canada	June 9, 2025
World records	400 m individual medley	(Canada) Summer McIntosh (CAN)	4:23.65	Victoria, Canada	June 11, 2025
World records	4×100 m medley relay	United States: Regan Smith; Lilly King; Kelsi Dahlia; Simone Manuel	3:50.40	Gwangju, South Korea	July 28, 2019

Mixed

World records	4×100 m mixed medley relay	United States: Ryan Murphy; Nic Fink; Gretchen Walsh; Torri Huske	3:37.43	Paris, France	August 3, 2024

== See also ==
- 200 metres individual medley
- 400 metres individual medley
- 4 × 50 metres medley relay
- 4 × 100 metres medley relay
