= Music of New York (state) =

New York is a major center for all types of music. Its diverse community has contributed to introducing and spreading many genres of music, including salsa, jazz, folk, rock and roll, and classical. New York's plethora of music venues and event halls serve as popular markers which have housed many noteworthy artists.

New York City is often regarded as one of the world's major centers for music.

The music of New York City includes a wide variety of hip-hop, soul, salsa, rock and roll, punk, metal, electronic music, pop music, disco and funk and crosses all (five) borough lines. Jazz in the city is in more-isolated spots in the boroughs outside Manhattan, but is mainly concentrated in the famous Greenwich Village mecca.

The rest of the state includes cities like Albany and Buffalo, which have their own scenes in a variety of genres. Nyack, Poughkeepsie and Long Island all have strong alternative music scenes.

The state is also home to many classical symphonies, folk groups and religious choirs.

== Music venues ==
New York has a multitude of music halls and venues that range in size and capacity as well as the genre it is known for. One of the most famous music halls in New York is the Apollo Theatre, located in the heart of Harlem. In 1913 the Apollo was built by Jules Hurtig and Harry Seamon, who originally used the theatre to host burlesque shows for the public. The Apollo would host the performances of acts that are well-known today as legends in their respective industries, including Ella Fitzgerald, James Brown, Miles Davis, Smokey Robinson, Jimi Hendrix, B.B. King, Diana Ross, and Prince.

When the Great Depression began in 1929, John Rockefeller was the owner of a strip in Manhattan worth ninety-one million dollars. He decided that he wanted to build upon the land he owned and eventually came to construct Rockefeller Center, including the Radio City Music Hall. Opening under the title of an Opera House, Radio City Music Hall was a popular location that the general public was given an opportunity to enjoy due to the tickets being relatively cheap in comparison to other Manhattan venues at the time.

Carnegie Hall was built in 1890 by philanthropist Andrew Carnegie on Seventh Ave between West 56th Street and West 57th Street in Manhattan. The five-level music hall is well-known for its Classical sound and has hosted a plethora of notable performers such as B.B King, The Beatles, The New York Philharmonic, Duke Ellington, Billie Holiday, Tina Turner, and The Rolling Stones.

While these are the more significant music venues in the State of New York, many others exist. These include, but are not limited to:

=== New York State ===
- Albany Municipal Auditorium
- Bailey Hall
- Bethel Woods Center
- Blue Cross Arena
- The Bowery Ballroom
- Eastman Theatre
- The Egg
- Harding Mazzotti Arena
- Highmark Stadium
- Hubbard Hall
- Java Barn
- JMA Wireless Dome
- KeyBank Center
- Kleinhans Music Hall
- Lakeview Amphitheater
- Landmark Theatre
- Main Street Armory
- MVP Arena
- Oncenter
- Palace Theater
- Richard B. Fisher Center for the Performing Arts
- Saratoga Performing Arts Center
- SEFCU Arena
- Shea’s Theater
- Stanley Theater
- State Theater
- Troy Savings Bank Music Hall
- Upstate Medical University Arena
- Washington Avenue Armory
- Water Street Music Hall
- The Westcott Theater

==== New York City Area ====
- 92nd Street Y
- Apollo Theater
- Barclays Center
- Bargemusic
- Birdland
- The Bitter End
- Bowery Ballroom
- Brooklyn Academy of Music
- Brooklyn Bowl
- Brooklyn Steel
- Capitol Theatre
- Carnegie Hall
- Citi Field
- Colden Auditorium
- Ford Amphitheater at Coney Island
- Island Federal Credit Union Arena
- Jones Beach Theater
- Lincoln Center
- Madison Square Garden
- Maimonides Park
- Manhattan Center
- Mercury Lounge
- Michael Schimmel Center for the Arts
- Miller Theatre
- Minton's Playhouse
- Music Hall of Williamsburg
- Nassau Coliseum
- Onyx Club
- Paradise Theater
- Pianos
- PlayStation Theater
- Radio City Music Hall
- Rockwood Music Hall
- Roseland Ballroom
- St. George Theatre
- Savoy Ballroom
- SIUH Community Park
- The Sound Factory Bar
- Terminal 5
- The Town Hall
- UBS Arena
- Westchester County Center
- Yankee Stadium

== Festivals and events ==
New York is home to a wide variety of music festivals each year. New York Philharmonic organizes the Free Memorial Day concert at Cathedral of St. John the Divine on Memorial Day. The cathedral also offers "Great Music in a Great Space" (GMGS). GMGS consists of three concert series: The Great Choir choral series, The Great Organ recital series, and holiday concerts. The Apollo Theater, Lincoln Center, The Blue Note Jazz Club, and Bargemusic also host consistent events.

Eastman School of Music in Rochester presents shows by the prestigious Rochester Philharmonic and acclaimed artists in each melodic style. Since 2002, Xerox has organized the Rochester International Jazz Festival in June at multiple venues throughout downtown Rochester. Chautauqua Institution offers numerous summer concerts in a pure lakeside setting, via its Symphony Orchestra, Opera Company, Chamber Music series, and Glimmerglass Festivaland recitals, performed by exceptional 17- to 25-year-old musicians.

The Glimmerglass Festival, formerly known as Glimmerglass Opera, organizes presentations every year in Cooperstown. Hunter Mountain has facilitated numerous summer music festivals, including Mountain Jam, Taste of Country Music Festival, German Alps Festival, and the International Celtic Festival.

Belleayre Music Festival likewise offers summer concerts in all styles of music, including a Catskill Mountain Jazz Series in August. Other music festivals include the Brantling Bluegrass Festival, Grey Fox Bluegrass Festival, Syracuse Jazz Festival, or Clearwater's Great Hudson River Revival, and JetLAG Festival, an annual music and arts festival held in summer in Fort Ann.

== Genres ==
=== Indigenous music ===
The varied history of New York’s music genres begins with the music of the Haudenosaunee Confederation, also known as the Iroquois. They inhabited large parts of New York State during the 17th and 18th centuries before some groups, such as the Seneca and Mohawk, were displaced to areas such as Oklahoma, Wisconsin and Ontario.

=== Salsa ===
This popular dance music came about during the early 1960s in New York City. The first salsa bands originally consisted of Puerto Rican and Cuban immigrants who arrived in the early 1920s. This well known Latin fusion arose through the hybridization of rhythms deriving from areas such as Puerto Rico and Cuba. Salsa began as an informal product of various preexisting popular Latin American styles of music such as son montuno, guaracha, cha chá, mambo, and to a certain extent bolero, and the Puerto Rican bomba and plena. Famous American percussionist and bandleader Tito Puente is credited for taking this newfound Afro-Cuban mix and developing it into a more defined genre. Other popular American Salsa singers from New York who popularized the genre were Mario Bauza, Mongo Santamaria and Perez Prado. Growth persisted in the genre due to its close relationship with another well known New York genre referred to as Latin jazz. This Afro-Cuban rhythmic form later branched out from New York to various Latin American countries to form regional variants.

=== Folk ===
In terms of music and culture, New York has always been diverse. After the Great Depression and Dustbowl, Folk became a pillar of the New York music scene and it quickly found a home base in Greenwich Village—a neighborhood that was the center of artistic innovation of all kinds. Israel G Young is also known as Izzy, a famous dancer in Greenwich village, opened the store Folklore Center which became a central place for all folkies . A few artists from the area went mainstream including Pete Seeger, Joan Baez, and Bob Dylan. Another center for urban folk was The Washington Square Park. On Sunday afternoon, all the folk musician including John Cohen, Mike Seeger, Barry Kornfeld, Eric Weissberg, Dave Van Ronk, Happy Traum, Jack Elliott, Tom Paley, Dick Rosmini, and Marshall Brickman used to flock to the place and sing for the rest of the day. Some of the famous folk groups are:

- The New Lost City Ramblers
- Kingston Trio
- Peter Paul & Mary
- The Weavers
- The Tarriers
- The Journeymen
- The Rooftop Singers

=== Blues and jazz ===
Blues music came to New York in the early 1900s as a slower and rather sad form of music. The term blues comes from the phrase “I'm feeling blue,” as in sad or down in one way or another. Blues Came to New York and very quickly gained a feeling of Jazz and became a form of music that is a tad up-tempo in comparison to its slow rural relative. New York Blues was primarily formed by Jesse Stone as well as Mabel Louis Smith who both stem from the southern to middle America where country blues originated. While most original blues songs were about God and faith, as time went on the music began to adapt to the joys and sorrows of rural life in the south until it was brought up north to New York.

Jazz has provided some of the most influential histories in New York within communities. The African American community has benefited greatly from the music genre especially with the exploration of the Cotton Club. The Cotton Club opened its doors in 1923 by Owen Madden as a white audience who were to be entertained by African American Performers. These performers may include Duke Ellington, Bill Robinson, Lena Horne, and Adelaide Hall where all of their careers received their humble beginnings. All these Jazz performers were given radio play through Columbia Records thus providing each artist with exposure. While Jazz was growing in popularity, prohibition had been in effect making alcohol illegal which led to the opening of Speakeasies around the City. These played a massive part in the Jazz culture because they would host large crowds at a secret location where people could drink and enjoy a performance from an upcoming artist like Duke Ellington in the Early 20s.

Jazz was just as much a fashion movement as it was a musical movement. The Jazz era in America led to women wearing more revealing clothing, cutting their hair, and becoming more promiscuous. These women, referred to as flappers, were just as much about adding purpose and changing the female mindset as they were about their fashion. Women were no longer submissive and were taking their path to having fun and altered a number of rules that had been set in the past for women.

=== Classical ===
New York contains a rich history in terms of the classical culture. This age of classical development began in the early 1830s. This classical age consisted of European classical music. During this rise of many troupes formed in order to support both the arts as well as American nationalism. Some of these entities such as the New York Philharmonic persisted into the recent history. During the early 1900s central hubs for formal performances began to arise such as the Metropolitan Opera House in 1882 and Carnegie Hall in 1891. American Composers such as George Frederick Bristow aided in the popularization of the Philharmonic. Edward MacDowell was another iconic classical composer in the early 1900s who began melding genres of folk which deviated from European classical music. The most influential New York composer of the early twentieth century was George Gershwin for his influence on the growing film industry. His stylistic nuances ranging from Jazz to symphony paved a path to the popularization of musical theater and Broadway.

=== Hip-hop ===
The South Bronx has been the center for struggle for a long time. After World War I the Jewish population of New York moved south to Manhattan or north to upstate New York. This is more commonly known as the "White Flight". The South Bronx became quickly filled with gang activity and landlord abandonment. In 1970, Dj's changed the game with looping the breakbeat. DJ Kool Herc, a Jamaican immigrant is often regarded as the father of hip-hop music. After the major breakthrough, hip hop exceeded past New York State and reached the west coast. Towards the mid 1980s hip-hop started to focus more on the rappers instead of dancing. Artists such as The Notorious B.I.G. started getting national recognition for their lyrical ability. These rappers would write songs about their toxic environment and created a whole subgenre of Hip-Hop called "Gangster Rap". Golden age hip hop is considered to be around the time period of 1980s and early 1990s. The 80's and 90's were dubbed the Golden Age due to new types of sub-genres of rap were emerging every day.

== See also ==
Music of New York City
