= Yiddish Glory =

Yiddish Glory: The Lost Songs of World War II is an album by Six Degrees Records which consists of Yiddish songs written during World War II and the Holocaust. It was nominated for the 61st Annual Grammy Awards.

== History ==
The team of a Russian Jewish ethnomusicologist and Yiddish scholar Moisei Beregovsky collected hundreds of Jewish songs during 1930–1940s, and planned to publish an anthology. However, during the post-war outbreak of Soviet anti-Semitism Beregovsky was convicted of "Jewish nationalism" and sent to Gulag. His confiscated archives were returned to his wife.

The collection of wax cylinder recordings, of which 600 were made by Beregovsky, was looted by the Nazis but returned after the war. However, when the Cabinet of Jewish Culture of the Ukrainian Academy of Sciences was liquidated, the recordings disappeared and were believed to be destroyed. In the 1990s Beregovsky's wax cylinders were discovered in the Vernadsky National Library of Ukraine and catalogized. His collections were published and republished, and many tunes entered the repertoire of Klezmer musicians.

Anna Shternshis, Al and Malka Green Professor in Yiddish Studies and the Director of the Anne Tanenbaum Centre for Jewish Studies at the University of Toronto worked with Beregovsky's paper archives, and Yiddish Glory is the result of a multi-year project by Shternshis and Psoy Korolenko. Most of the selected Holocaust-related songs had only lyrics, and musical solutions for them were suggested by Sergei Erdenko.

It was nominated and shortlisted for the 61st Annual Grammy Awards in the World Music category.

== Track listing ==
From the Six Degrees Records website:

- "Afn Hoykhn Barg" – On The High Mountain
  - A satirical song, lyrics by a Veli Shargorodskii about the war experience of a Jewish soldier in 1943–44; ends with the words "Hitler is kaput!" (Hitler is done for!, a phrase learned by heart by every Soviet person by the end of the war, because that's what surrendering Germans repeated like a mantra.)
- "Shpatsir in Vald" – A Walk in the Forest
- "Yoshke Fun Odes" – Yoshke From Odessa
- "Kazakhstan"
  - Central Asia was a major destination of Soviet civilians, including 1.4 million Jews (with some 250,000 in Kazakhstan), where at their new workplaces they met the Jews sent to Gulag. The song is about this piece of the Jewish eternal exile experience. For this song Erdenko composed the only new tune, combining Roma, Yiddish and Romanian musical styles.
- "Mayn Pulemyot" – My Machine Gun
  - A Jewish soldier's pride at his machine gun killing the Germans
- "Shelakhmones Hitlern" – Purim Gifts For Hitler
  - compares Hitler with Haman, the villain of Purim
- "Taybls Briv" – Taybl's Letter To Her Husband at the Front
- "Misha Tserayst Hitlers Daytchland" – Misha Tears Apart Hitler's Germany
- Chuvasher Tekhter – Daughters of Chuvashia, words by Sonya Roznberg, 1942.
- "Mames Gruv" – My Mother's Grave
  - The song a child who visits the grave of the mother who perished in the Holocaust.
- "Babi Yar"
  - About the Babi Yar massacre. The song is that of a Jewish soldier (one of half a million who served in the Soviet Army) who returns to Kiev and learns that all his family was massacred.
- "Tulchin"
  - Tulchyn was under the Romanian administration during the Holocaust. The song was written by a 10-year-old who lost his family in the ghetto in Tulchin
- "Shturemvind" – A Storm Wind
- "Fir Zin" – Four Sons
- "Kazakhstan" reprise
- "Nitsokhn Lid" – Victory Song
- "Homens Mapole" – Haman's Defeat
- "Tsum Nayem Yor 1944" – Happy New Year 1944

== Band ==
According to the Six Degrees Records webpage:

- Psoy Korolenko, Russian-American singer-songwriter
- Sergei Erdenko, Romani violinist, collaborator of Yehudi Menuhin and founder of the Roma musical group Loyko.
- Artur Gorbenko, violinist, pianist, composer for films and television programs, and former concertmaster from the Leningrad Conservatory.
- Mikhail Savichev, classical and Romani guitarist, graduate of Russia's Novosibirsk Conservatory, Member of the Loyko group before moving to Spain to study under the mentorship of Paco de Lucia.
- Sophie Milman, Juno Award winning jazz vocalist
- Alexander Sevastian, accordionist from Quartetto Gelato
- Shalom Bard, clarinetist at the Toronto Symphony Orchestra, conductor of its youth symphony, and former principal clarinetist at the Israel Philharmonic Orchestra
- David Buchbinder, Juno Award-winning trumpeter, composer & producer, founder of Odessa/Havana and artistic director of the New Canadian Global Music Orchestra
- Sasha Lurje, Yiddish vocalist
- Isaac Rosenberg (son of Shternshis and Rosenberg), 12 years old when the project started; performs three songs, including music written by a ten year old Jewish orphan whose parents perished during the Holocaust.
- Anna Shternshis, Al and Malka Green Professor in Yiddish Studies and the Director of the Anne Tanenbaum Centre for Jewish Studies at the University of Toronto

The producer and the person who brought the band together is Daniel Rosenberg.
