= Sean Williams (ethnomusicologist) =

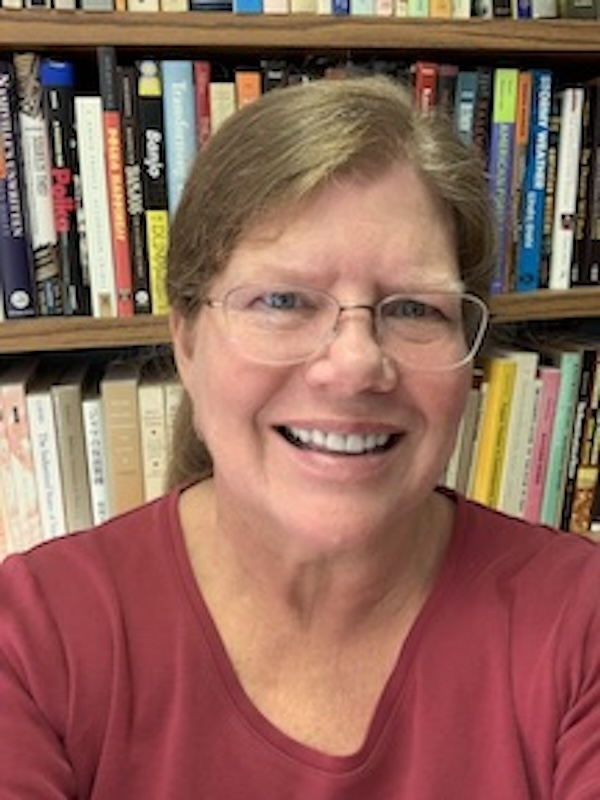

Sean Williams (born 1959, Berkeley, California) is an ethnomusicologist who retired from teaching after 35 years at The Evergreen State College in Olympia, Washington in 2026.

== Early life and education ==
Williams was raised in Berkeley, California, and spent her high school years in Mill Valley, California where she attended Tamalpais High School, graduating in 1977. She received a BA in classical guitar performance from UC Berkeley in 1981. After a year working in Europe, she moved to Seattle for graduate school. She earned an MA (on Irish-language singing, 1985) and Ph.D. (on aristocratic song in West Java, Indonesia, 1990) in ethnomusicology from the University of Washington (Seattle).

== Teaching Career ==
Her first teaching jobs were part-time at the University of Washington, then she was hired as a Visiting Assistant Professor at Columbia University in New York City in 1990-1991. In 1991 she was hired as a continuing member of the faculty at The Evergreen State College. Her primary areas of teaching have included music, Irish studies, and Asian studies; she led the Sundanese music ensembles Gamelan Degung Girijaya (Enduring Mountain Gamelan) and Angklung Buncis Sukahejo. She has also taught on the Semester at Sea, in a faculty exchange program through the University of Hyōgo, and at several adult music camps.

== Scholarship ==
Williams has written over fifty articles about music, and written or edited several books about music, food, and grammar:

- 1998 The Garland Encyclopedia of World Music (Southeast Asia) (Routledge - with Terry E. Miller)
- 2001 The Sound of the Ancestral Ship: Highland Music of West Java (Oxford University Press)
- 2005 The Ethnomusicologists' Cookbook (Routledge)
- 2008 The Garland Handbook of Southeast Asian Music (Routledge - with Terry E. Miller)
- 2010 Focus: Irish Traditional Music (Routledge)
- 2011 Bright Star of the West: Joe Heaney, Irish Song-Man (Oxford - with Lillis Ó Laoire)
- 2015 The Ethnomusicologists' Cookbook, vol.2 (Routledge)
- 2019 English Grammar: 100 Tragically Common Mistakes and How to Correct Them (Zephyros)
- 2020 Focus: Irish Traditional Music, 2nd edition (Routledge)
- 2021 Musics of the World (Oxford University Press)
- 2026 Music at the Threshold from the Sacred to the Dangerous (Oxford University Press)

== Awards ==
- 1988 Fulbright Program Doctoral Research Fellowship
- 1989 Ford Foundation Doctoral Dissertation Fellowship
- 2012 Alan P. Merriam Prize for Outstanding Monograph in the Field of Ethnomusicology (for Bright Star of the West: Joe Heaney, Irish Song-Man, co-written with Lillis Ó Laoire)
- 2023 Society for Ethnomusicology Prize for Most Significant Article Published in the Field of Ethnomusicology (for "Poetry Writing as Transgressive Ethnography", in Ethnomusicology 66/3: 361-377) and Honourable Mention from the International Council for Traditions of Music and Dance.
- 2025 Honourable Mention, International Council for Traditions of Music and Dance best article (for “Vernacular Catholicism in Ireland: The Keening Woman” in Religions 15/879: 1-14. Special issue, Musicology of Religion: Selected Papers on Religion and Music). [co-written with Lillis Ó Laoire].

== Service ==
Williams has served as a council and board member of the Society for Ethnomusicology, in which she served as Second Vice President, is a participant in the Special Interest Group on Celtic Music, and was formerly on the board of the Society for Asian Music; she belongs to several other academic societies. She is a board member of Celtic MKE which hosts the Milwaukee Irish Fest. Lastly, she hosts the Captain Grammar Pants page on Facebook, in which she posts tips on grammar, punctuation, capitalization, spelling, and etymology.

== Musicianship ==
Williams is also a musician; she plays numerous Irish, Indonesian, and Brazilian instruments along with the classical guitar, fiddle, and banjo. She performs in the Brazilian Samba Olywa ensemble in Olympia, Washington. She sings in multiple languages, and has performed with composer/conductor Eric Whitacre in his Virtual Choir and onstage at Carnegie Hall and Lincoln Center.
