= Psoy Korolenko =

Russian actor and singer (born 1967)

- Псой Галактионович Короленко
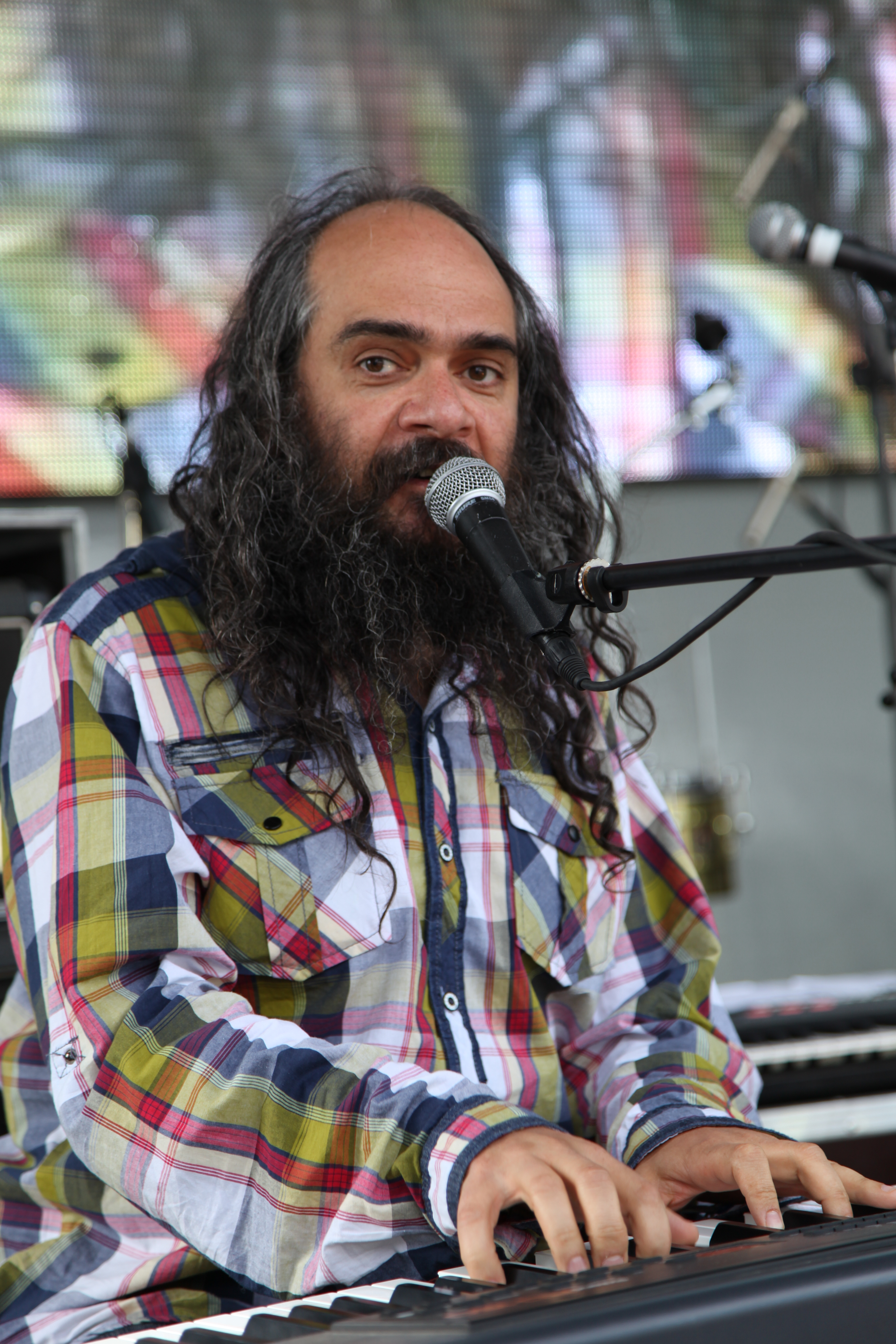
- Korolenko in 2012
- Born: Павел Эдуардович Лион; April 26, 1967 (age 59); Russian SFSR, Soviet Union
- Citizenship: Russia
- Occupations: Musician, songwriter, slavist

Psoy Galaktionovich Korolenko (Russian: Псой Галактионович Короленко; born April 26, 1967) is a pseudonym of a Russian songwriter and performer by the name of Pavel Eduardovich Lion (Russian: Павел Эдуардович Лион). Pavel Lion is also a slavist with a Ph.D. in Russian literature.

== Musical career ==
His pseudonym comes from Russian writer Vladimir Korolenko (1853–1921), whose works are a subject of Pavel's research. In university, Korolenko studied under Russian literature historian Nikolai Liban, among others. Korolenko does indeed have a doctorate in Russian literature, and he has been invited to teach around the world. Korolenko is best known as a performer.

Psoy performs his own and others' songs, accompanying himself to keyboard instruments, mainly a Casio synthesizer in accordion timbre. Experimenting with quite various song traditions he sings in about six or seven languages, most frequently in Russian, Yiddish, English and French.

For example, one of Psoy's songs, Buratino, is an a capella rhythmic recitation of the same phrase – "Buratino byl tupoy" ("Buratino was dumb") – which after several repetitions starts to morph into other phrases, eventually shifting into Italian through syllable rearrangement. More phrases are then introduced and "mixed" vocally with it. The song is something of a parody of rap and trance music.

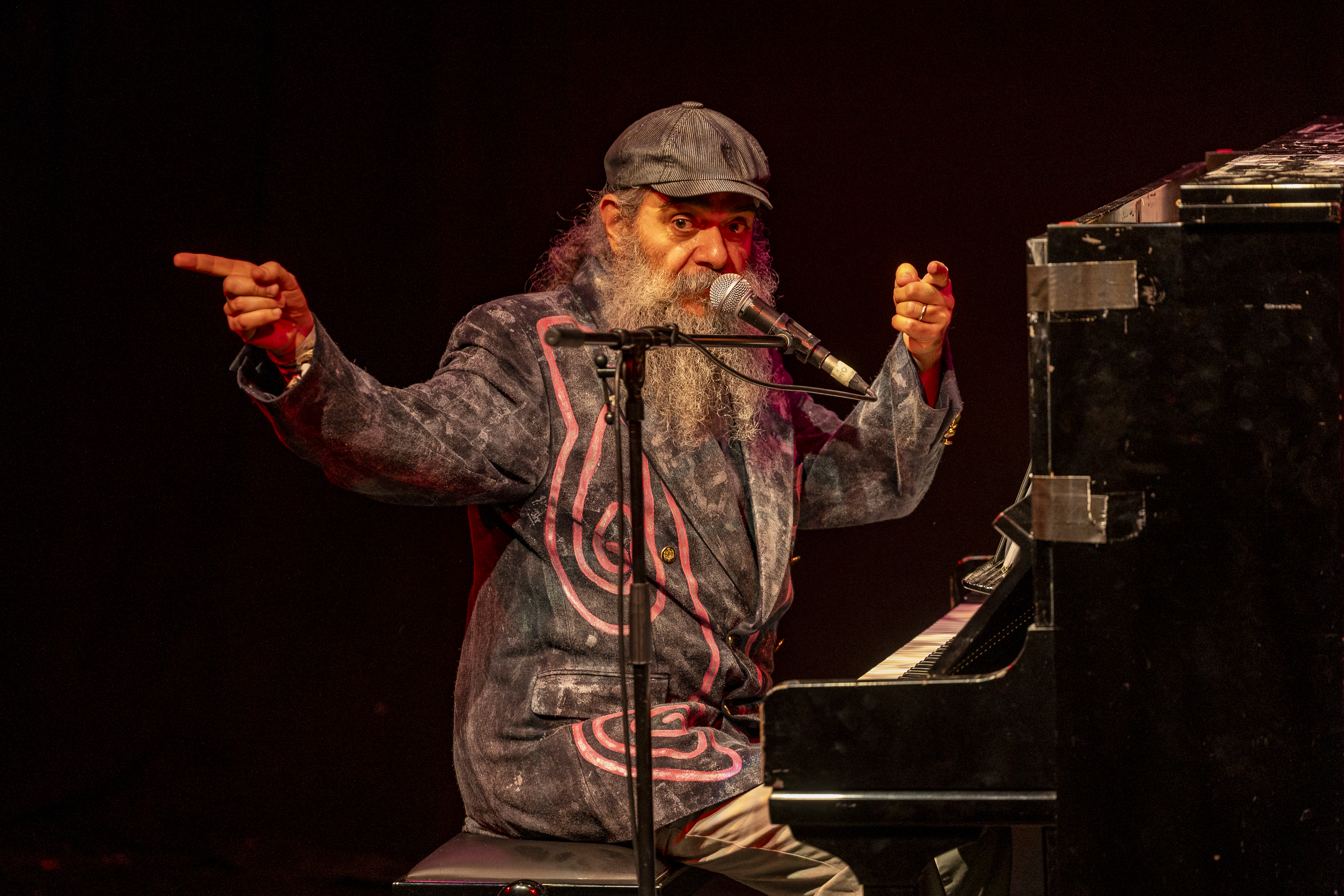
Psoy Korolenko performing in 2025

Psoy tours extensively beyond Russian borders, particularly in the United States, Europe and Israel. His music is popular both with adults (especially linguists) and teenagers. He rewrites many songs, and also has translated some songs from Russian to Yiddish. He has collaborated with musicians such as Julian Kytasty, Michael Alpert, and Daniel Kahn & The Painted Bird. He has been involved in events celebrating Bundist organisations, such as playing music for the 120th anniversary of the Jewish Labour Bund in Melbourne, Australia.

Korolenko was one of the principal artists behind the Yiddish Glory project, a musical and archival initiative led by University of Toronto scholar Anna Shternshis. The project revived previously unknown Yiddish songs written by Holocaust victims and survivors in the Soviet Union during World War II, discovered in the Vernadsky National Library of Ukraine.

Korolenko serves as a co-founder and the creative director of the annual JetLAG Festival in upstate New York, where he curates a lineup focused on avant-garde and klezmer. He is involved in promoting diverse musical genres within the festival's framework.

Korolenko has regularly taught Jewish folklore as a seasonal faculty member at Dartmouth College. His teaching is sponsored by the Jewish Studies Program and the East European, Eurasian & Russian Studies Department.

In 2019 he was awarded the Fiddler on the Roof Award in the "Cultural Event of the Year" category for the creation of the album Yiddish Glory.

== Discography ==
Original name	English name/translation	Year	Co-producers
Песня про Бога	A Song about God	2000	
Fioretti	Fioretti	2001	
Песнь песней Псоя Короленко	Psoy Korolenko's Song of Songs	2003	
Шлягер века	Schlagers of the Century	2003	
Гонки	Races	2004	Neoangin
C чего начинается Родина (Un Vu Iz Der Onheyb Fun Foterland)	From What the Homeland Starts	2006	All Stars Klezmer Band
Русское богатство. Том I.	Russian Riches. Volume I.	2007	Alyona Alenkova
The Unternationale	The First Unternational	2008	Daniel Kahn and Oy Division
На лестнице дворца	On the Steps of the Palace	2008	Olga Chikina, Alyona Arenkova and others
Под покровом нощи	Under Cover of Night	2010	Opa!
Shloyme	Shloyme	2011	Timofeev Ensemble
Русское богатство. Том II.	Russian Riches. Volume II.	2013	Alyona Alenkova
Dicunt	Dicunt	2013	Oy Division
Жить не по лжи	Live Not by Lies	2013	Opa!
ИМАРМЕНИЯ: Песни о том, что сбывается	Imarmenia: Songs About What Comes True	2015	
НННН № 2 ПППП	NNNN #2 PPPP	2015	Igor Krutogolov
The Brothers Nazaroff: The Happy Prince		2015	Daniel Kahn, Michael Alpert, Jake Shulman-Ment, Bob Cohen, and Hampus Melin
סוּס, כּלבֿ, חייל און אַ זונה	Equine, Canine, Soldier, Whore	2017	Israelifts
Yiddish Glory: The Lost Songs of World War II		2018	Anna Shternshis, Sergei Erdenko, Sophie Milman, and others; Grammy-nominated
Ловцы музыки | Pescadores de Música	Fishers of Music	2020	Дефеса - Defesa (Alisa Ten, Yuliya Teunikova, Yan Bederman, and others)
The Unternationale: The Third Unternational		2020	Daniel Kahn and others
The Unternationale: The Fourth Unternational		2020	Daniel Kahn and others
Хроники Аналоговой Жизни: Chansons de Guy Béart	Chronicles of Analogous Life: Songs of Guy Béart	2020	Fyodor Chistyakov, Olga Chikina, Gary Katz, Andrey Matlin, and others

== See also ==
- List of multilingual bands and artists
