= Max Goldin =

Latvian musician

Max Goldin (Latvian: Maksis Goldins; August 10, 1917 in Riga, Russian Empire – January 21, 2009 in Riga, Latvia) was a Latvian Jewish musician, known for his studies and compositions in the field of ethnic musical cultures.

He studied composition and music theory in Riga with Jāzeps Vītols through the years of 1935–1939 and composition in Moscow with Anatoly Aleksandrov through 1944–1948. Goldin was teaching the music theory in the Conservatory of Riga. He wrote two dissertations on topics of ethno-musicology. He was awarded the DSc title in 1970 for his studies in that field. He was a Professor Emeritus of the Latvian State Conservatory since 2001.

== Discography ==
- Jewish Folksongs arranged by Max Goldin, Ada Svetlova (voice), Natalia Schroeder (piano). LP. Melodiya, Moscow, USSR, 1981, C 13293-4
- Jewish Folksongs for a cappella choir arranged by Max Goldin, State Academic Capella of Latvian SSR, conductor Imants Cepitis, Inese Galante, Janis Sprogis (soloists).LP. Melodiya, Moscow, USSR, C 1028553-4
- 18 Jewish Folk songs arranged by Max Goldin, Inese Galante (voice), Janis Bulavs (violin), Vladimirs Hohlovs (piano), Imants Zemzaris (piano). CD. Campion Records, Wilmslow, England, RRCD 1340
