= Mikhail Shcherbakov =

Russian poet (born 1963)

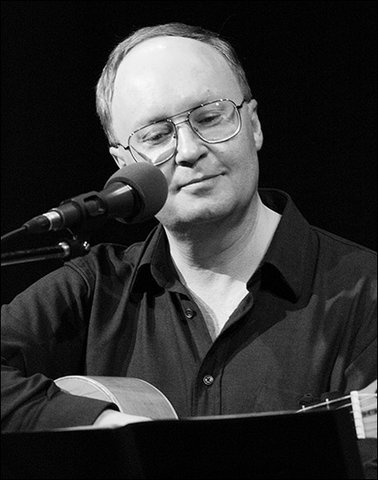

Background information
- Born: March 27, 1963 (age 63)
- Occupations: singer, songwriter, poet and bard
- Instrument: guitar
- Years active: 1978–present

Mikhail Konstantinovich Shcherbakov (Russian: Михаил Константинович Щербаков; born on March 27, 1963) is a prominent Russian poet, songwriter and bard. He was born in Obninsk. He graduated from Moscow State University and now lives in Moscow. Shcherbakov started writing songs in 1978. Since then he has written more than 400 songs and lyrics. He has recorded 20 CD albums and more than 20 audio tapes.
