= Anna Shternshis =

Canadian Judaic scholar

Anna Shternshis is a J. Richard and Dorothy Shiff Chair in Jewish Studies and the director of the Anne Tanenbaum Centre for Jewish Studies at the University of Toronto. She used to hold the title of Al and Malka Green Professor of Yiddish studies. Her research interests include Jewish culture in the Soviet Union; Jewish-Slavic cultural relations; Yiddish mass culture, theatre, and music.

She received her M.A. degree from Russian State University for the Humanities and Ph.D. degree in Modern Languages and Literatures from Oxford University in 2001. Shternshis is the author of two books, as well as over 20 articles and book chapters. She is the co-editor-in-chief of East European Jewish Affairs.

Shternshis together with composer/performer and slavist Psoy Korolenko created and directed Yiddish Glory, a project to release the forgotten Yiddish songs written during the Holocaust in the Soviet Union. It was nominated and shortlisted for the 61st Annual Grammy Award in the world music category.

== Books ==
- Soviet and Kosher: Jewish Popular Culture in the Soviet Union, 1923–1939, Bloomington, Indiana University Press, 2006
- When Sonia Met Boris: An Oral History of Jewish Life under Stalin, New York, Oxford University Press, 2017
